= List of birds of New Brunswick =

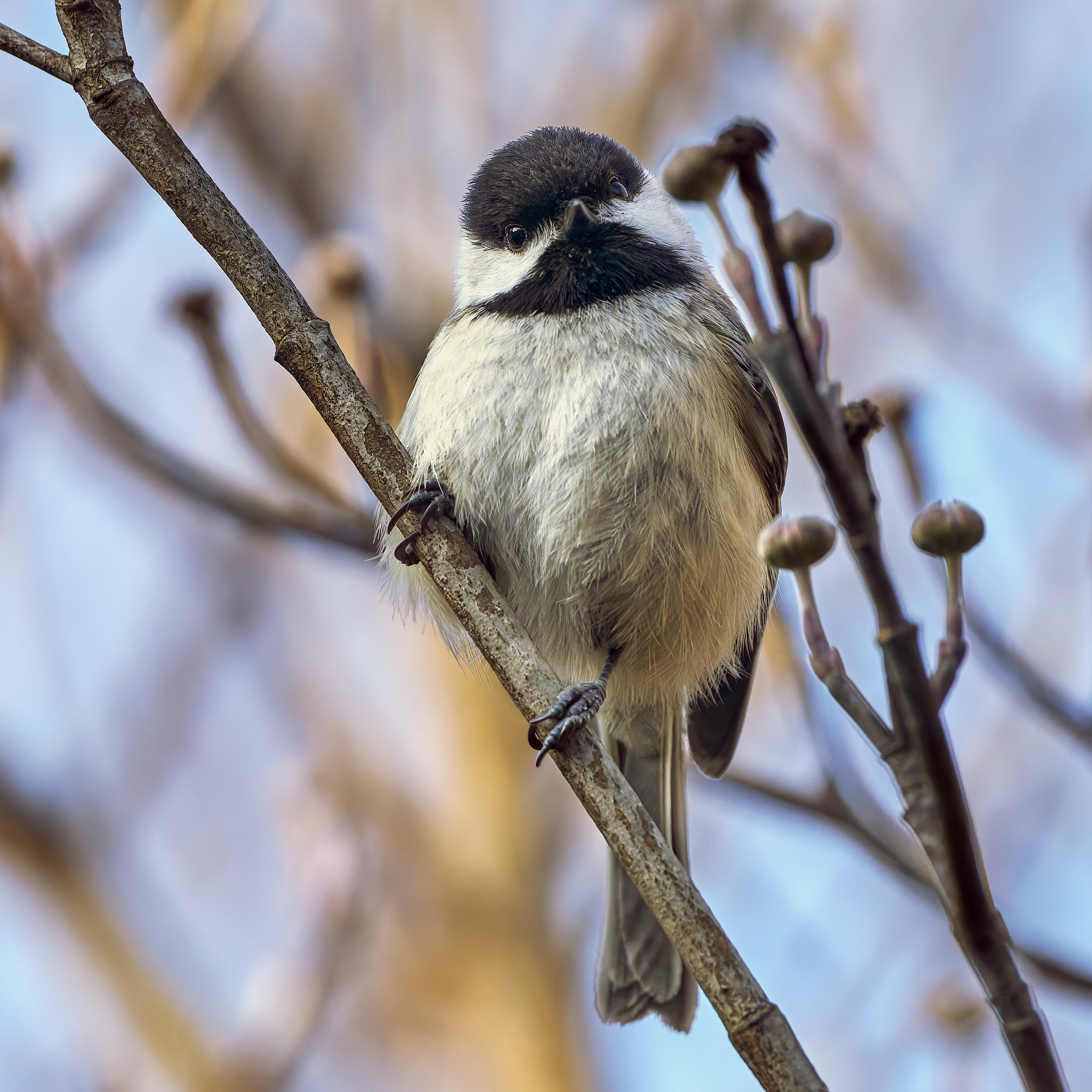
The black-capped chickadee is the provincial bird of New Brunswick

New Brunswick is a Maritime province within Canada, bordered by Quebec to the north, Nova Scotia to the east, the Gulf of St. Lawrence to the northeast, the Bay of Fundy to the southeast, and the U.S. state of Maine to the west. Lying within the Appalachian Mountain range, the province is largely covered by temperate broadleaf and mixed forests, with the northern part of the province also containing boreal forest. The coastlines of the province contain a large marine environment. These different ecosystems contribute to the diversity of birds in the province. Additionally, the Atlantic Flyway passes through New Brunswick's coast, with areas within the Bay of Fundy such as the Shepody Bay significantly contributing to the variety of bird species that breed in or migrate through the province.

The information provided is from the list of bird species accepted by the New Brunswick Bird Records Committee (NBBRC), which contains 441 species as of November 19, 2023. Of these, 94 are accidentals and 55 are noted as rare as defined below. Eight species have been introduced to North America, one species has been extirpated, three are extinct, and another is possibly extinct. This list is presented in the taxonomic sequence of the Check-list of North and Middle American Birds, 7th edition through the 62nd Supplement, published by the American Ornithological Society (AOS). Common and scientific names are also those of the Check-list, except that Canadian English spellings are used and the common names of families are from the Clements taxonomy because the AOS list does not include them.

The following tags are used to categorise some species:

- (A) Accidental - a species that does not often occur in New Brunswick as a vagrant
- (B) Breeding - a species that currently breeds or has bred in New Brunswick
- (E) Extinct - a recent species that no longer exists
- (Ex) Extirpated - a species that no longer occurs in New Brunswick, but populations still exist elsewhere
- (R) Rare - "Very rare (not expected annually)" per the NBBRC
- (I) Introduced - a species that has been introduced through human intervention, either directly or indirectly

== Ducks, geese, and waterfowl ==
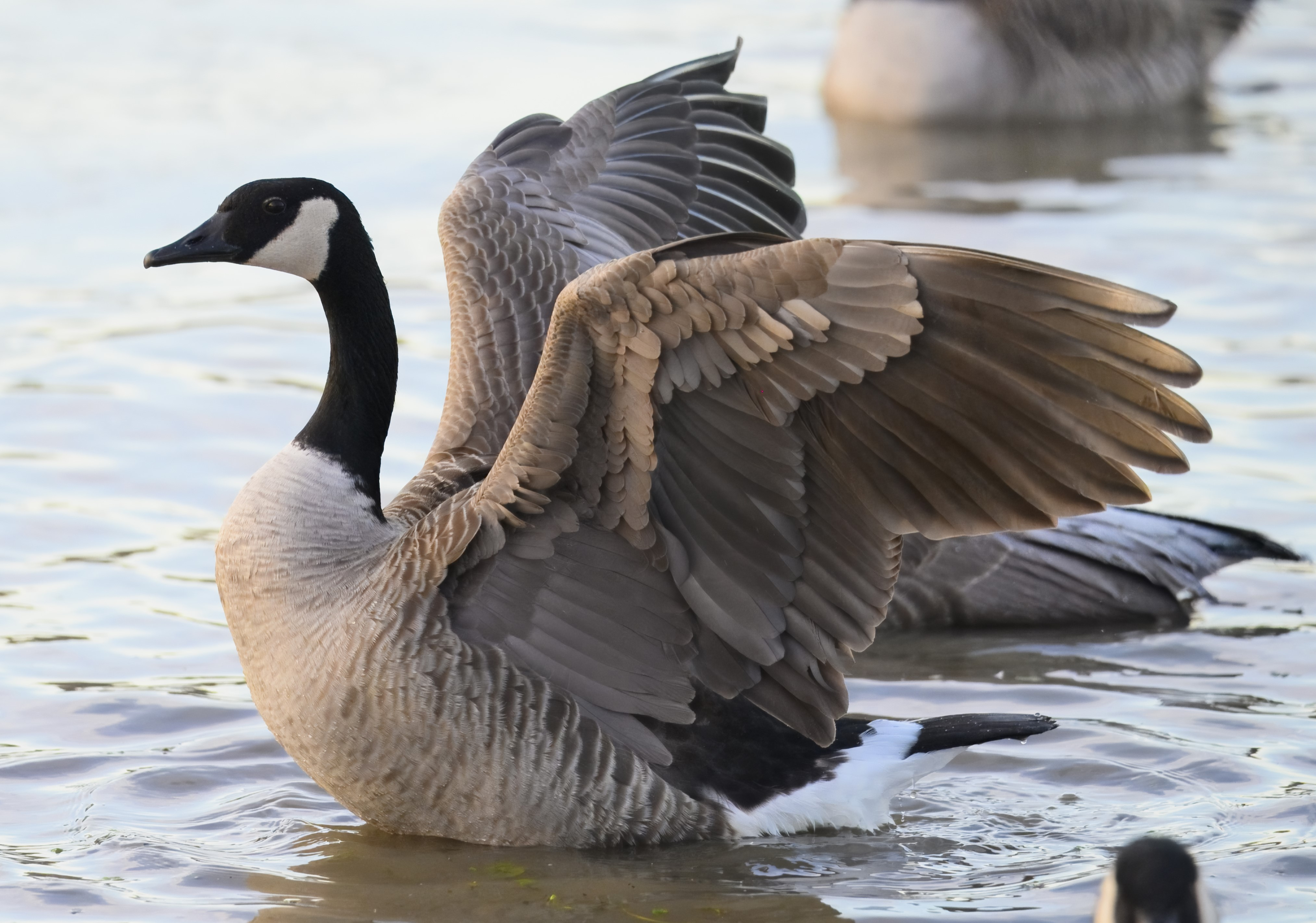
Canada goose

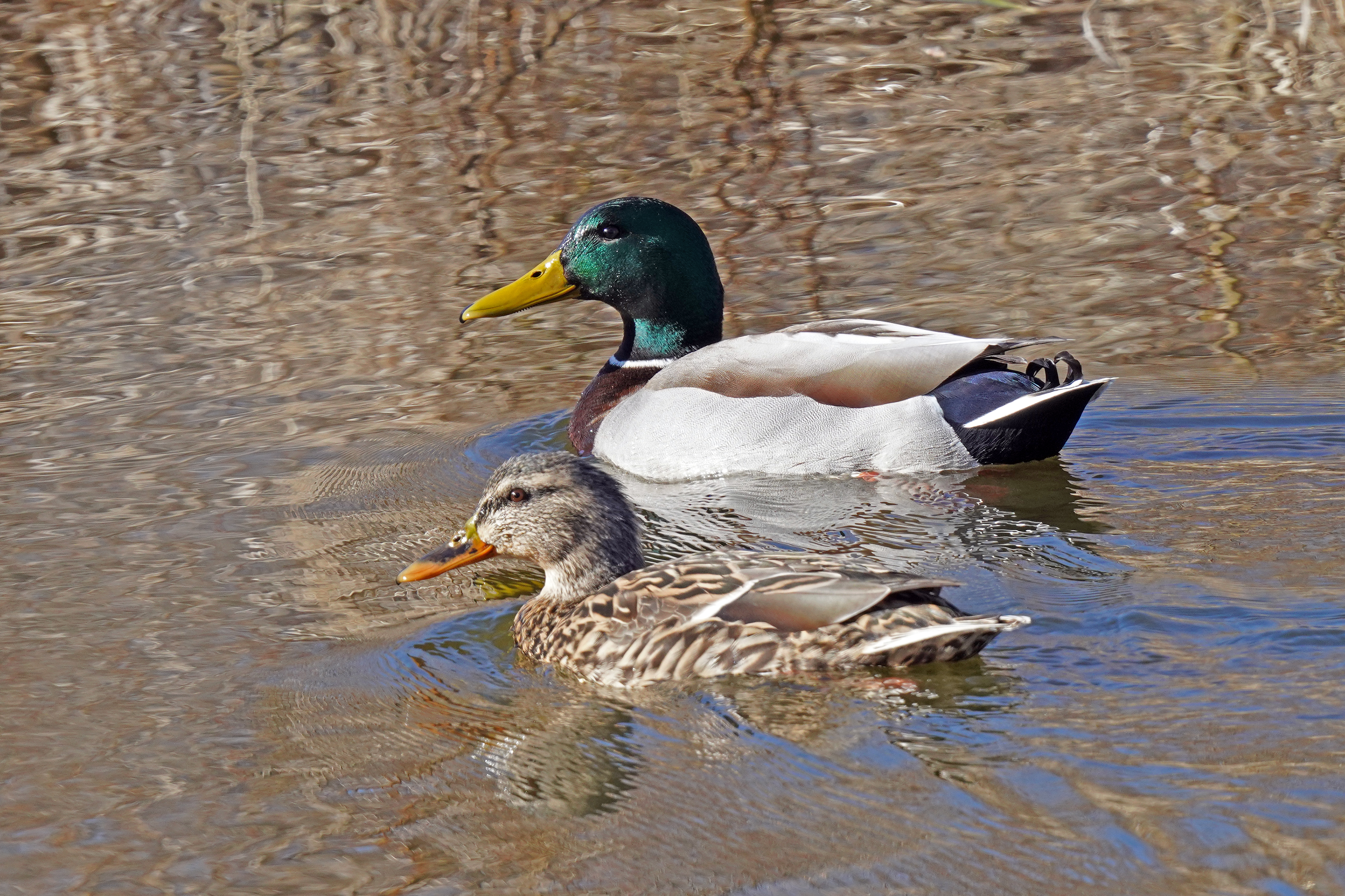
Mallard pair

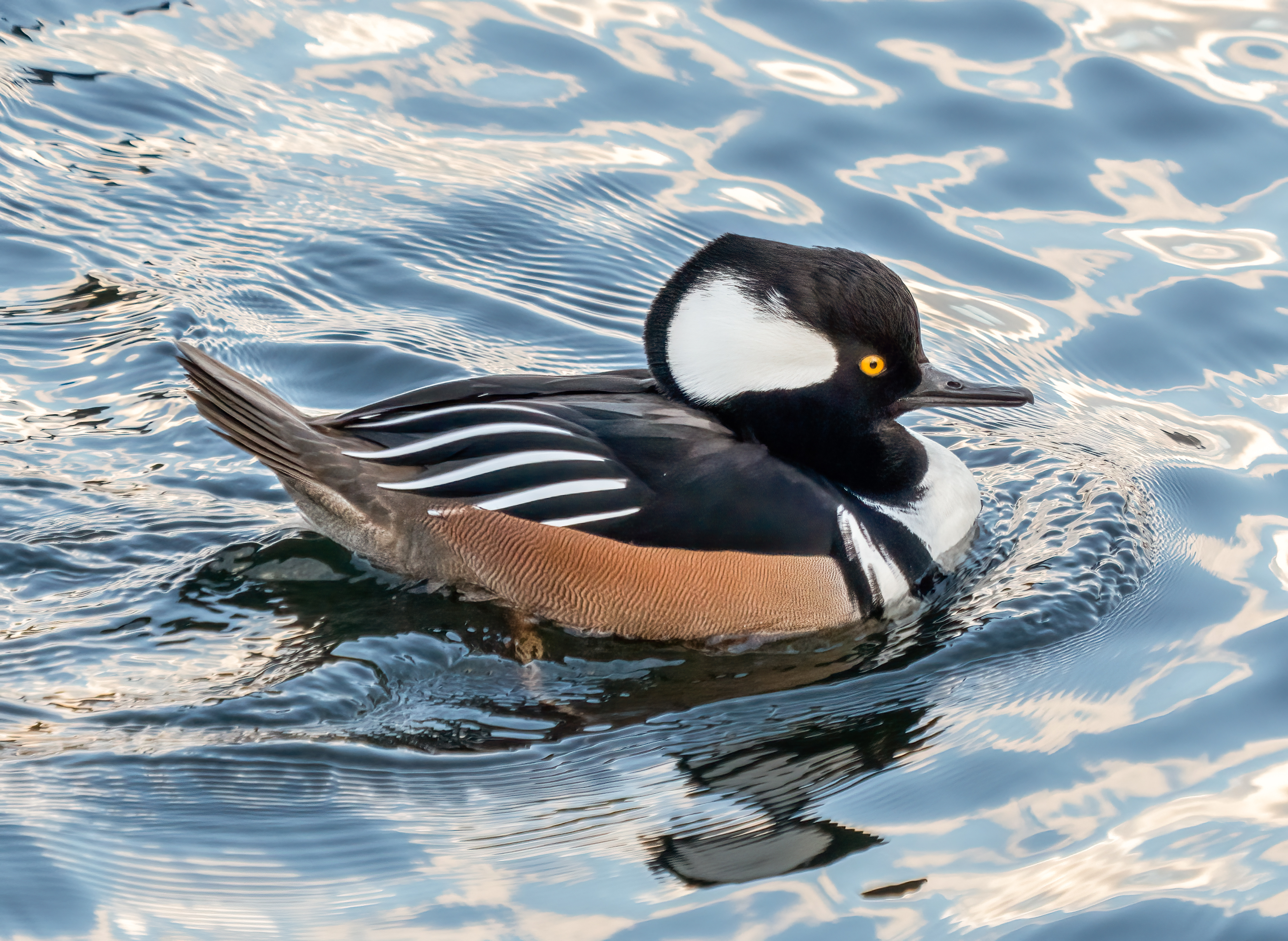
Hooded merganser

Order: Anseriformes Family: Anatidae

Anatidae includes the ducks and most duck-like waterfowl, such as geese and swans. These birds are adapted to an aquatic existence with webbed feet, bills which are flattened to a greater or lesser extent, and feathers that are excellent at shedding water.

- Black-bellied whistling-duck (dendrocygne à ventre noir), Dendrocygna autumnalis (A)
- Fulvous whistling-duck (dendrocygne fauve), Dendrocygna bicolor (A)
- Snow goose (oie des neiges), Anser caerulescens
- Ross's goose (oie de Ross), Anser rossii (A)
- Graylag goose (oie cendrée), Anser anser (A)
- Greater white-fronted goose (oie rieuse), Anser albifrons (R)
- Pink-footed goose (oie à bec court), Anser brachyrhynchus (R)
- Brant (bernache cravant), Branta bernicla
- Barnacle goose (bernache nonnette), Branta leucopsis (A)
- Cackling goose (bernache de Hutchins), Branta hutchinsii (R)
- Canada goose (bernache du Canada), Branta canadensis (B)
- Mute swan (cygne tuberculé), Cygnus olor (A) (I)
- Tundra swan (cygne siffleur), Cygnus columbianus (R)
- Common shelduck (tadorne de Belon), Tadorna tadorna (A)
- Wood duck (canard branchu), Aix sponsa (B)
- Garganey (sarcelle d'été), Spatula querquedula (A)
- Blue-winged teal (sarcelle à ailes bleues), Spatula discors (B)
- Cinnamon teal (sarcelle cannelle), Spatula cyanoptera (A)
- Northern shoveler (canard souchet), Spatula clypeata (B)
- Gadwall (canard chipeau), Mareca strepera (B)
- Eurasian wigeon (canard siffleur), Mareca penelope
- American wigeon (canard d'Amérique), Mareca americana (B)
- Mallard (canard colvert), Anas platyrhynchos (B)
- American black duck (canard noir), Anas rubripes (B)
- Northern pintail (canard pilet), Anas acuta (B)
- Green-winged teal (sarcelle à ailes vertes), Anas crecca (B)
- Canvasback (fuligule à dos blanc), Aythya valisineria (R)
- Redhead (fuligule à tête rouge), Aythya americana
- Ring-necked duck (fuligule à collier), Aythya collaris (B)
- Tufted duck (fuligule morillon), Aythya fuligula (R)
- Greater scaup (fuligule milouinan), Aythya marila (B)
- Lesser scaup (petit fuligule), Aythya affinis
- King eider (eider à tête grise), Somateria spectabilis
- Common eider (eider à duvet), Somateria mollissima (B)
- Harlequin duck (arlequin plongeur), Histrionicus histrionicus
- Labrador duck (eider du Labrador), Camptorhynchus labradorius (E)
- Surf scoter (macreuse à front blanc), Melanitta perspicillata
- White-winged scoter (macreuse à ailes blanches), Melanitta deglandi
- Black scoter (macreuse à bec jaune), Melanitta americana
- Long-tailed duck (harelde de Miquelon), Clangula hyemalis
- Bufflehead (petit garrot), Bucephala albeola
- Common goldeneye (garrot à œil d'or), Bucephala clangula (B)
- Barrow's goldeneye (garrot d'Islande), Bucephala islandica
- Hooded merganser (harle couronné), Lophodytes cucullatus (B)
- Common merganser (harle bièvre), Mergus merganser (B)
- Red-breasted merganser (harle huppé), Mergus serrator (B)
- Ruddy duck (érismature rousse), Oxyura jamaicensis

== Pheasants, grouse, and allies ==
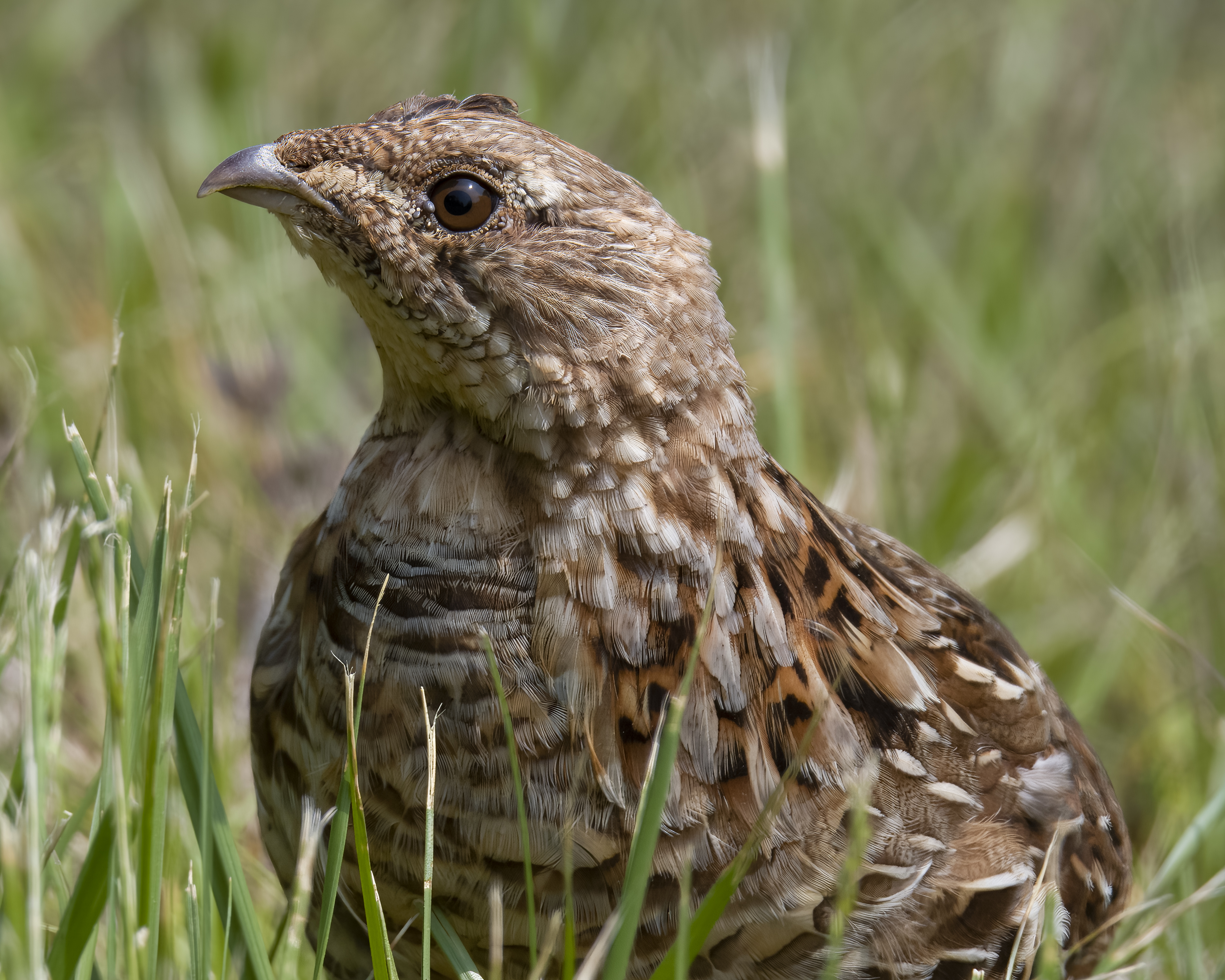
Ruffed grouse

Order: Galliformes Family: Phasianidae

Phasianidae consists of the pheasants and their allies. These are terrestrial species, variable in size but generally plump with broad relatively short wings. Many species are gamebirds or have been domesticated as a food source for humans.

- Wild turkey (dindon sauvage), Meleagris gallopavo (B)
- Ruffed grouse (gélinotte huppée), Bonasa umbellus (B)
- Spruce grouse (tétras du Canada), Canachites canadensis (B)
- Grey partridge (perdrix grise), Perdix perdix (Ex) (I)
- Ring-necked pheasant (faisan de Colchide), Phasianus colchicus (I)

== Grebes ==
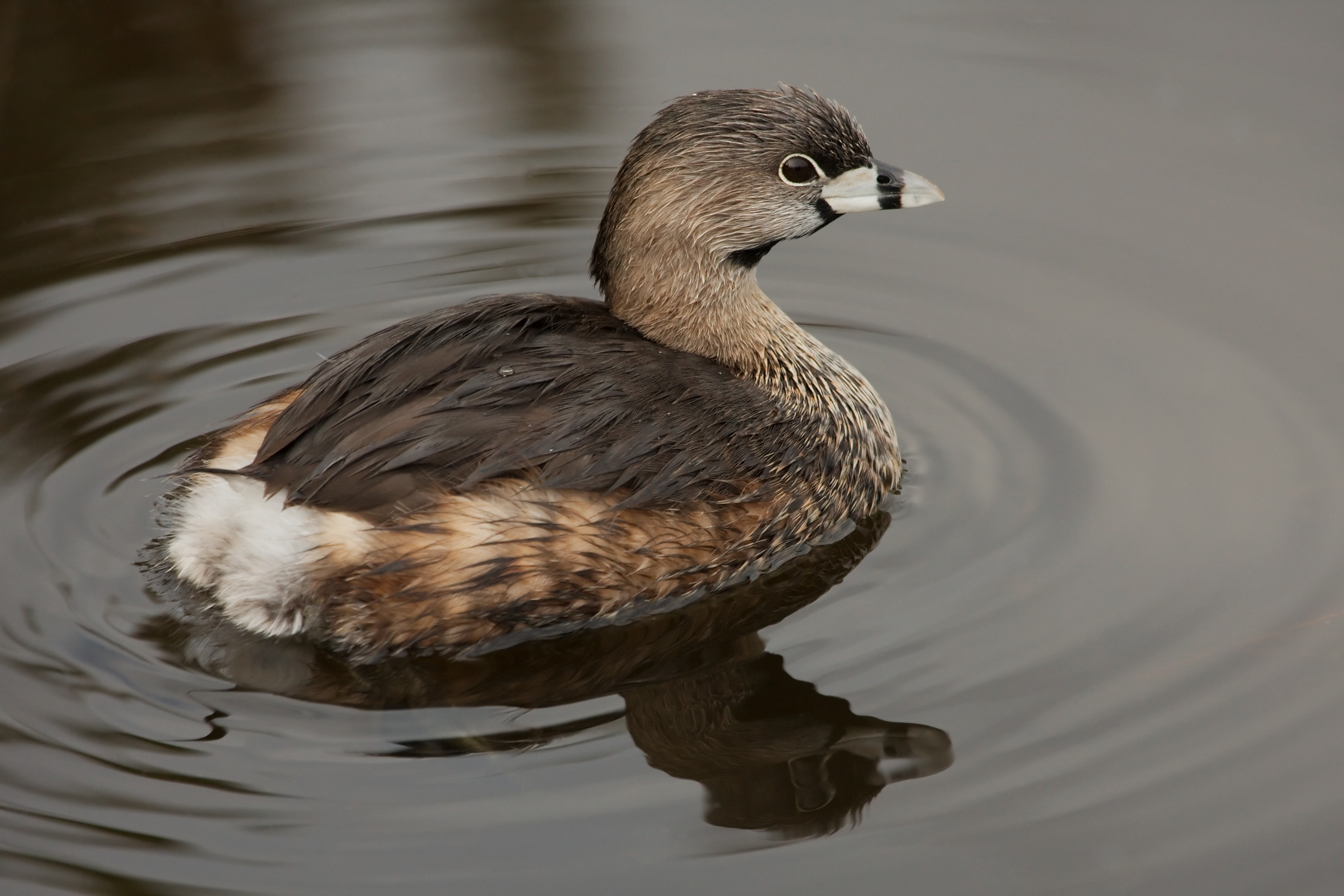
Pied-billed grebe

Order: Podicipediformes Family: Podicipedidae

Grebes are small to medium-large freshwater diving birds. They have lobed toes and are excellent swimmers and divers. However, they have their feet placed far back on the body, making them quite ungainly on land.

- Pied-billed grebe (grèbe à bec bigarré), Podilymbus podiceps (B)
- Horned grebe (grèbe esclavon), Podiceps auritus
- Red-necked grebe (grèbe jougris), Podiceps grisegena
- Eared grebe (grèbe à cou noir), Podiceps nigricollis (A)
- Western grebe (grèbe élégant), Aechmorphorus occidentalis (A)

== Pigeons and doves ==
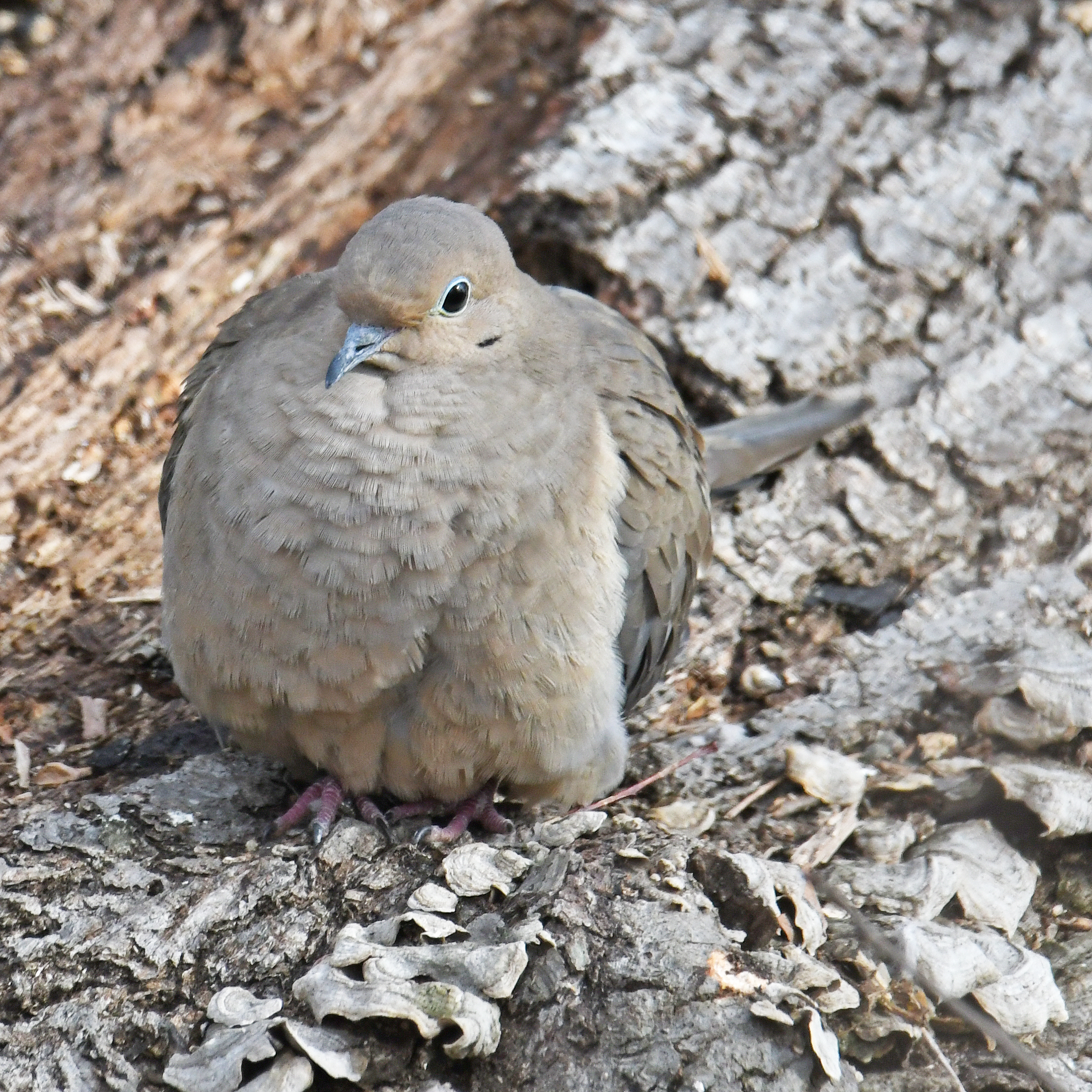
Mourning dove

Order: Columbiformes Family: Columbidae

Pigeons and doves are stout-bodied birds with short necks and short slender bills with a fleshy cere. They have strong flight muscles, allowing them to take off almost vertically and fly for long distances. They typically feed on seeds and fruit plants, and produce "crop milk" to feed their young.

- Rock pigeon (pigeon biset), Columba livia (B) (I)
- Band-tailed pigeon (pigeon à queue barrée), Patagioenas fasciata (A)
- Eurasian collared-dove (tourterelle turque), Streptopelia decaocto (A) (I)
- Passenger pigeon (tourte voyageuse), Ectopistes migratorius (E)
- White-winged dove (tourterelle à ailes blanches), Zenaida asiatica
- Mourning dove (tourterelle triste), Zenaida macroura (B)

== Cuckoos ==
Order: Cuculiformes Family: Cuculidae

The family Cuculidae includes cuckoos, roadrunners, and anis. These birds are of variable size with slender bodies, long tails, and strong legs.

- Yellow-billed cuckoo (coulicou à bec jaune), Coccyzus americanus
- Black-billed cuckoo (coulicou à bec noir), Coccyzus erythropthalmus (B)

== Nightjars and allies ==
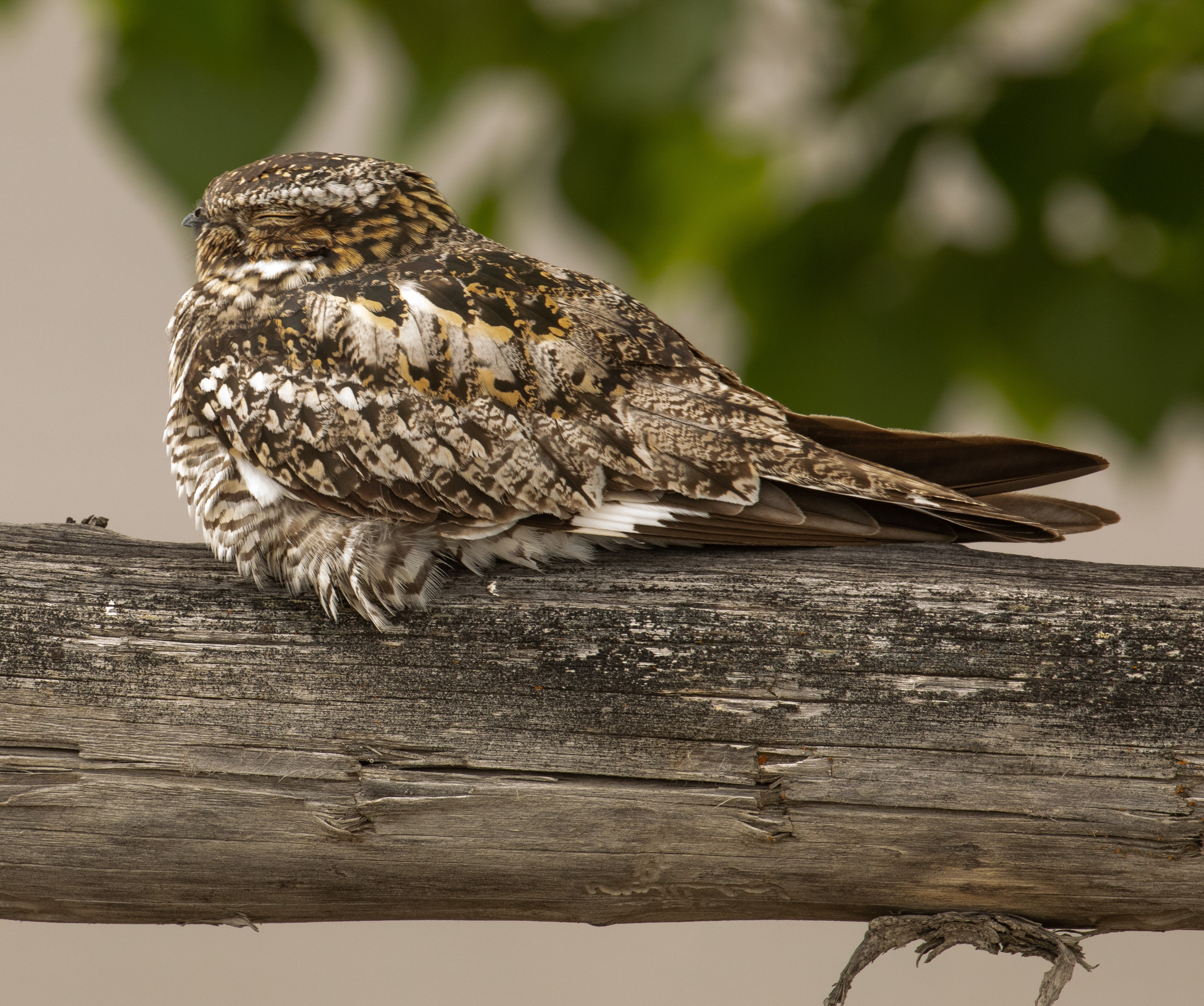
Common nighthawk

Order: Caprimulgiformes Family: Caprimulgidae

Nightjars are medium-sized nocturnal birds that usually nest on the ground. They have long wings, short legs, and very short bills. Most have small feet, of little use for walking, and long pointed wings. Their soft plumage is cryptically coloured to resemble bark or leaves.

- Common nighthawk (engoulevent d'Amérique), Chordeiles minor (B)
- Chuck-will's-widow (engoulevent de Caroline), Antrostomus carolinensis (A)
- Eastern whip-poor-will (engoulevent bois-pourri), Antrostomus vociferus (B)

== Swifts ==
Order: Apodiformes Family: Apodidae

The swifts are small birds which spend the majority of their lives flying. These birds have very short legs and never settle voluntarily on the ground, perching instead only on vertical surfaces. Many swifts have long swept-back wings which resemble a crescent or boomerang.

- Chimney swift (martinet ramoneur), Chaetura pelagica (B)

== Hummingbirds ==
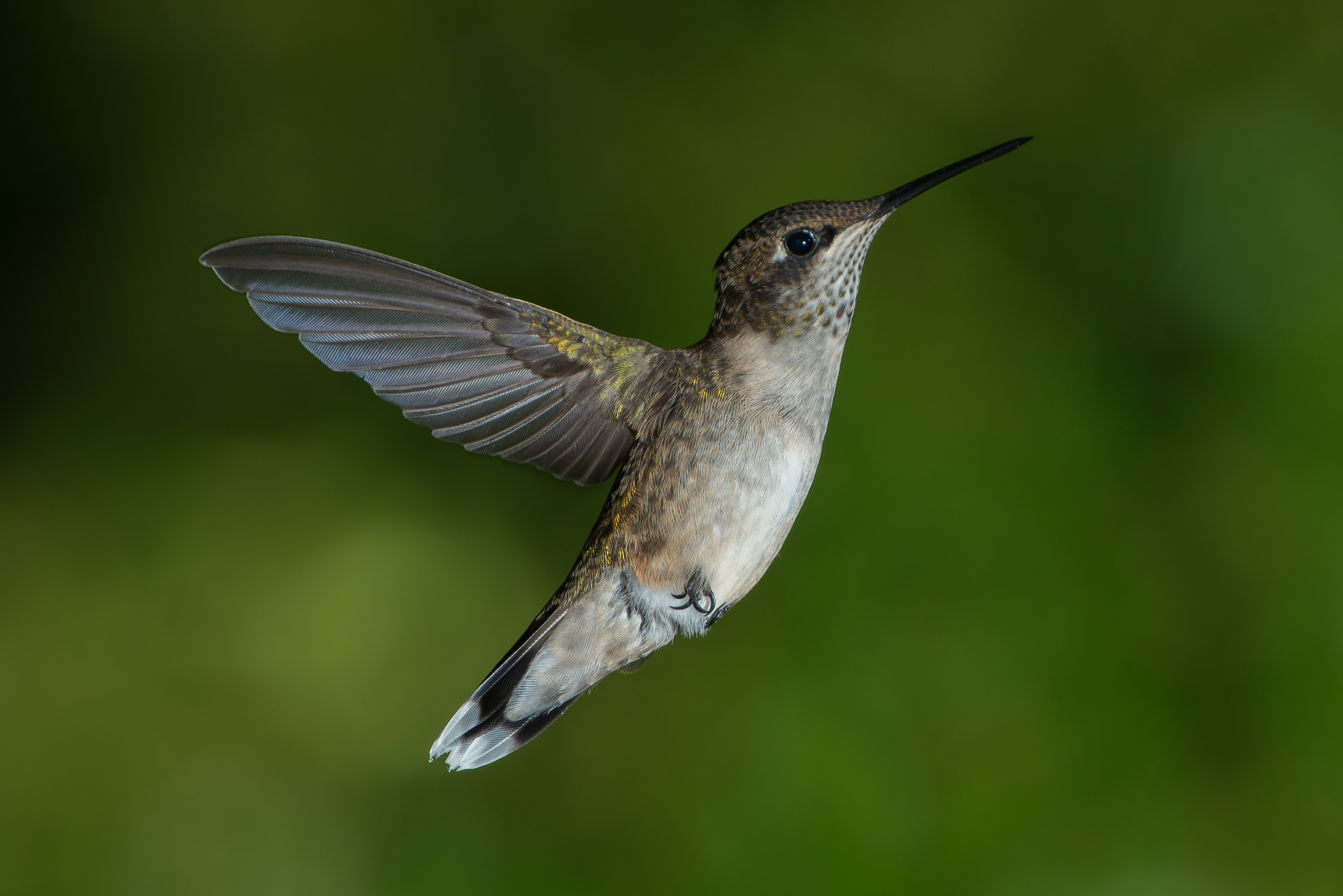
Ruby-throated hummingbird

Order: Apodiformes Family: Trochilidae

Hummingbirds are small birds capable of hovering in mid-air due to the rapid flapping of their wings. They are the only birds that can fly backwards.

- Ruby-throated hummingbird (colibri à gorge rubis), Archilochus colubris (B)
- Black-chinned hummingbird (colibri à gorge noire), Archilochus alexandri (A)
- Rufous hummingbird (colibri roux), Selasphorus rufus (R)
- Broad-billed hummingbird (colibri circé), Cynanthus latirostris (A)

== Rails, gallinules, and coots ==
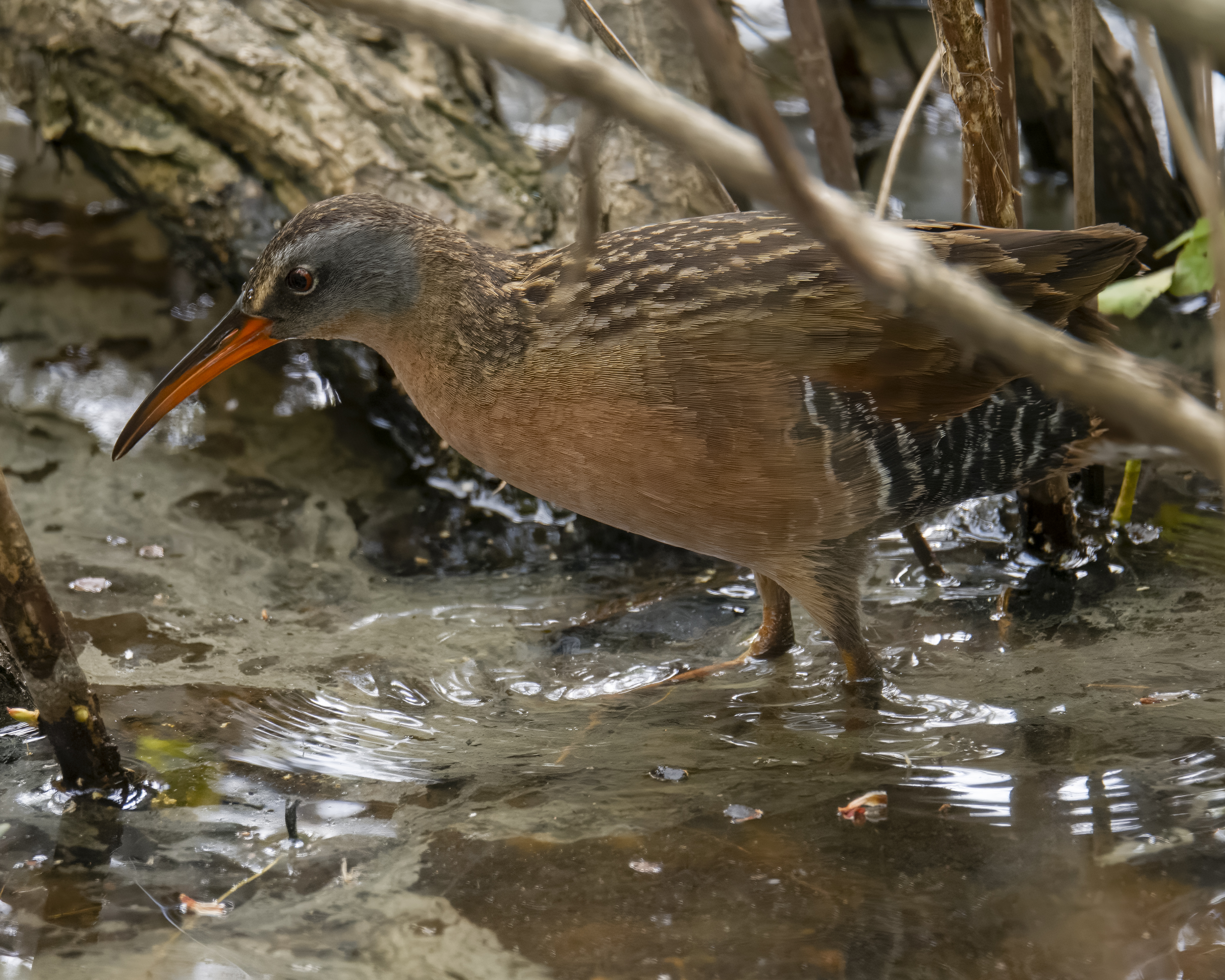
Virginia rail

Order: Gruiformes Family: Rallidae

Rallidae is a large family of small to medium-sized birds which includes the rails, crakes, coots, and gallinules. The most typical family members occupy dense vegetation in damp environments near lakes, swamps, or rivers. In general they are shy and secretive birds, making them difficult to observe. Most species have strong legs and long toes which are well adapted to soft uneven surfaces. They tend to have short, rounded wings and to be weak fliers.

- Clapper rail (râle tapageur), Rallus crepitans (R)
- King rail (râle élégant), Rallus elegans (A)
- Virginia rail (râle de Virginie), Rallus limicola (B)
- Sora (marouette de Caroline), Porzana carolina (B)
- Common gallinule (gallinule d'Amérique), Gallinula galeata (B)
- American coot (foulque d'Amérique), Fulica americana (B)
- Purple gallinule (talève violacée), Porphyrio martinicus (R)
- Yellow rail (râle jaune), Coturnicops noveboracensis (B)

== Cranes ==
Order: Gruiformes Family: Gruidae

Cranes are large, long-legged and long-necked birds. Unlike the similar-looking but unrelated herons, cranes fly with necks outstretched, not pulled back. Most have elaborate and noisy courting displays or "dances".

- Sandhill crane (grue du Canada), Antigone canadensis (R)

== Stilts and avocets ==
Order: Charadriiformes Family: Recurvirostridae

Recurvirostridae is a family of large wading birds which includes the avocets and stilts. The avocets have long legs and long up-curved bills. The stilts have extremely long legs and long, thin, straight bills.

- Black-necked stilt (échasse d'Amérique), Himantopus mexicanus (A)
- American avocet (avocette d'Amérique), Recurvirostra americana (R)

== Oystercatchers ==
Order: Charadriiformes Family: Haematopodidae

Oystercatchers are large, obvious and noisy plover-like birds, with strong bills used for smashing or prising open molluscs.

- American oystercatcher (huîtrier d'Amérique), Haematopus palliatus (R)

== Plovers and lapwings ==
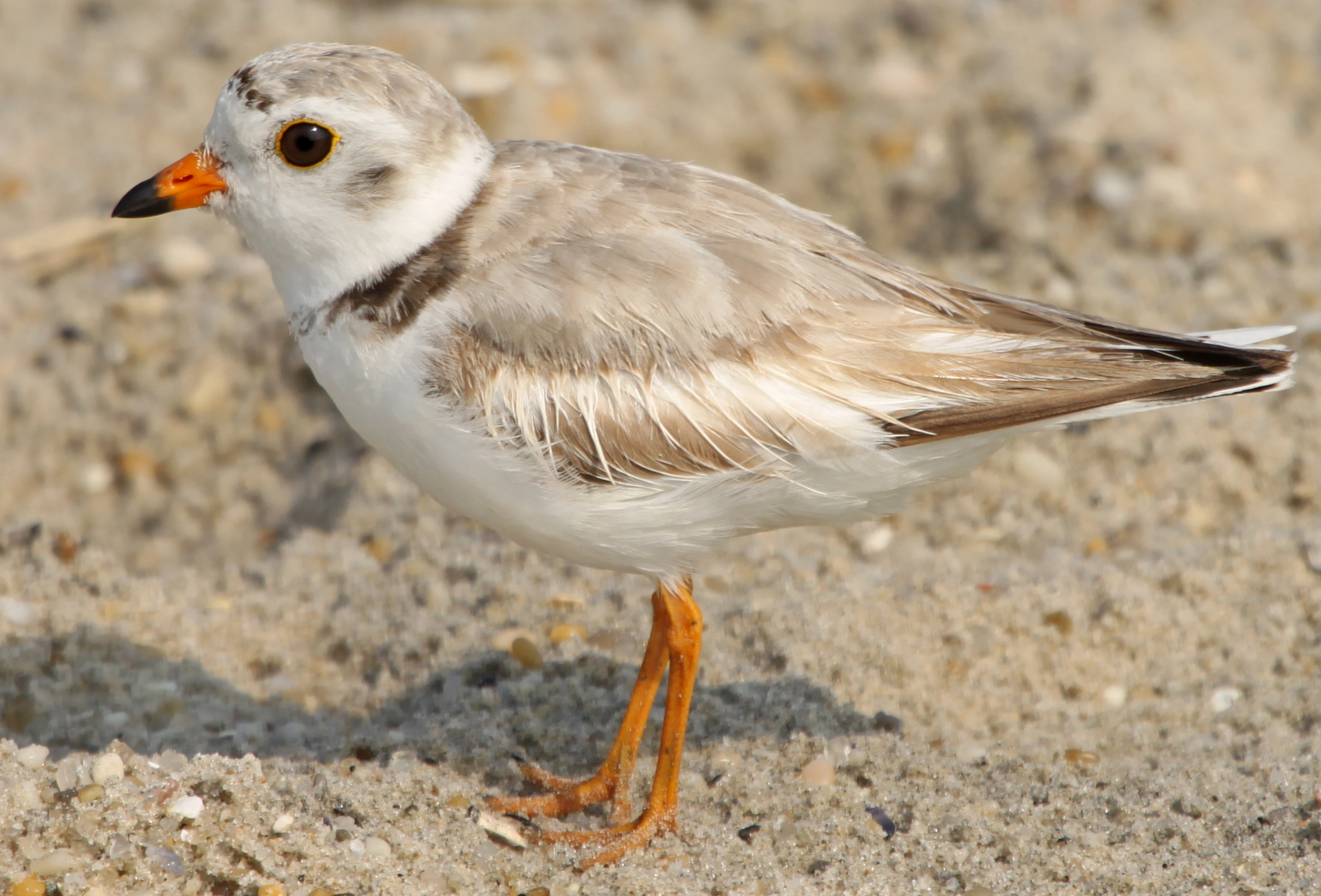
Piping plover

Order: Charadriiformes Family: Charadriidae

The family Charadriidae includes the plovers, dotterels, and lapwings. They are small to medium-sized birds with compact bodies, short thick necks, and long, usually pointed, wings. They are found in open country worldwide, mostly in habitats near water.

- Northern lapwing (vanneau huppé), Vanellus vanellus (A)
- Black-bellied plover (pluvier argenté), Pluvialis squatarola
- American golden-plover (pluvier bronzé), Pluvialis dominica
- Killdeer (pluvier kildir), Charadrius vociferus (B)
- Wilson's plover (pluvier de Wilson), Charadrius wilsonia (A)
- Semipalmated plover (pluvier semipalmé), Charadrius semipalmatus
- Piping plover (pluvier siffleur), Charadrius melodus (B)

== Sandpipers and allies ==
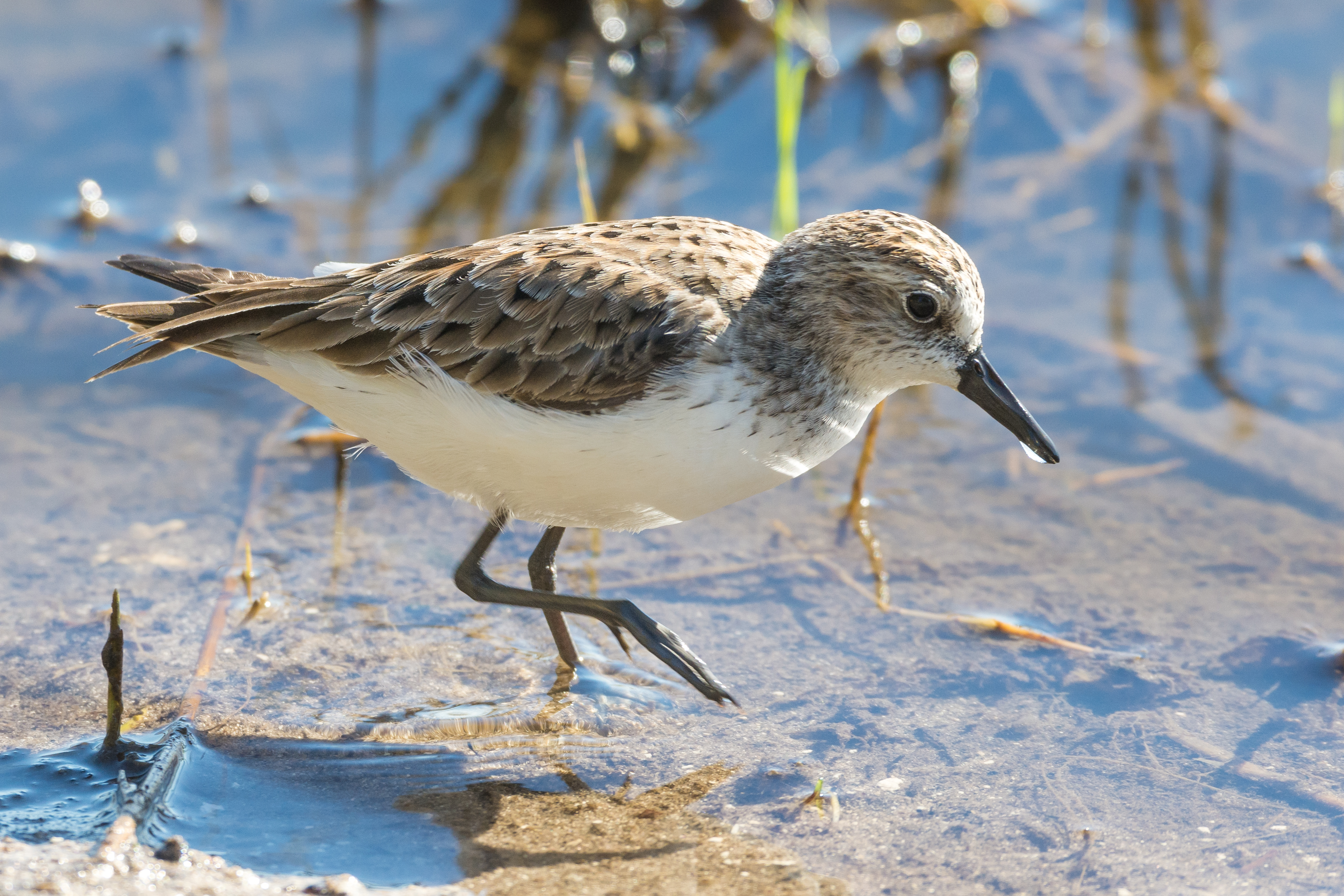
Semipalmated sandpiper

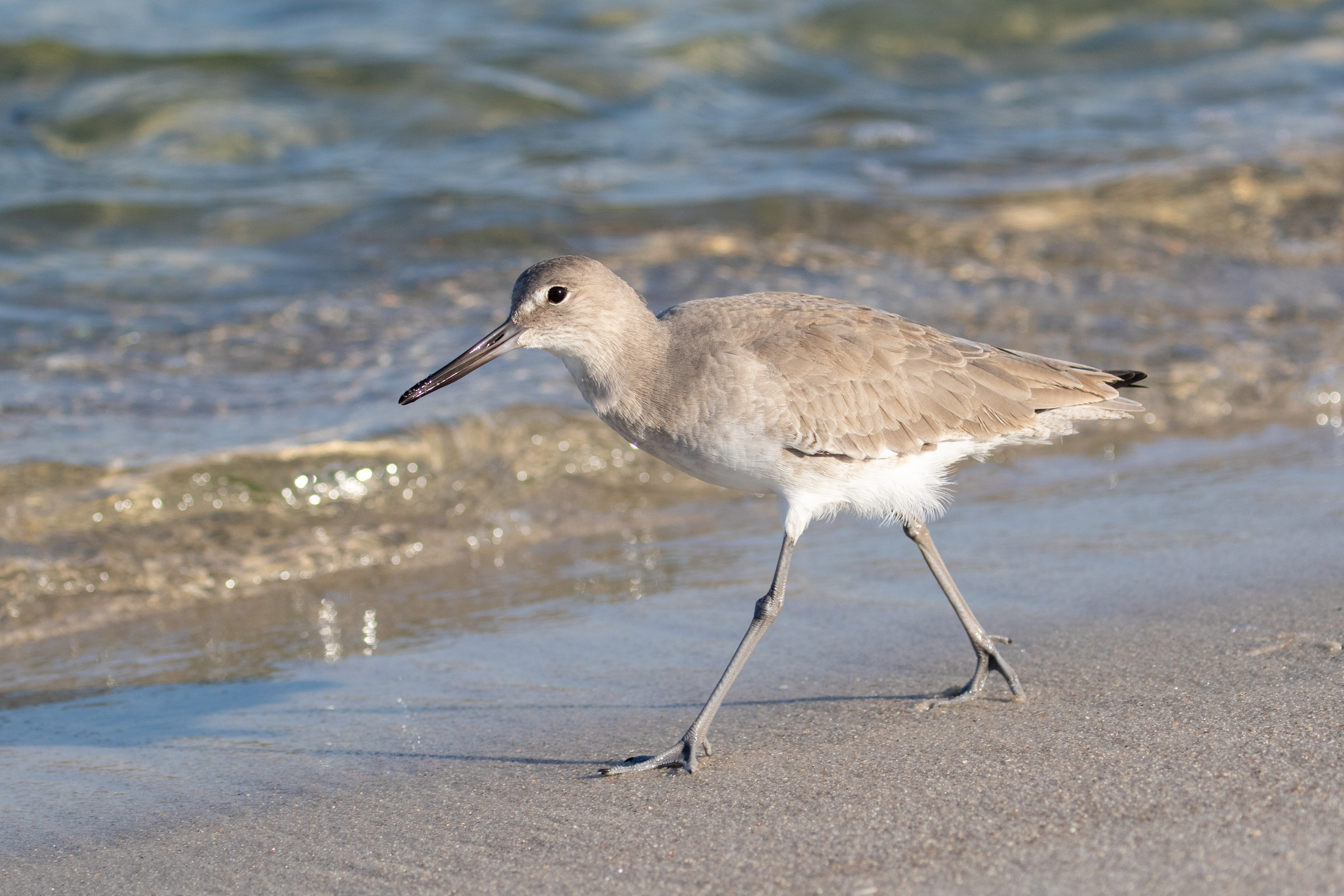
Willet

Order: Charadriiformes Family: Scolopacidae

Scolopacidae is a large diverse family of small to medium-sized shorebirds including the sandpipers, curlews, godwits, shanks, tattlers, woodcocks, snipes, dowitchers, and phalaropes. The majority of these species eat small invertebrates picked out of the mud or soil. Different lengths of legs and bills enable multiple species to feed in the same habitat, particularly on the coast, without direct competition for food.

- Upland sandpiper, Bartramia longicauda (B)
- Whimbrel, Numenius phaeopus
- Eskimo curlew, Numenius borealis (possibly extinct)
- Long-billed curlew, Numenius americanus (A)
- Black-tailed godwit, Limosa limosa (A)
- Hudsonian godwit, Limosa haemastica
- Marbled godwit, Limosa fedoa (R)
- Ruddy turnstone, Arenaria interpres
- Red knot, Calidris canutus
- Ruff, Calidris pugnax (R)
- Stilt sandpiper, Calidris himantopus
- Curlew sandpiper, Calidris ferruginea (R)
- Sanderling, Calidris alba
- Dunlin, Calidris alpina
- Purple sandpiper, Calidris maritima
- Baird's sandpiper, Calidris bairdii
- Little stint, Calidris minuta (A)
- Least sandpiper, Calidris minutilla
- White-rumped sandpiper, Calidris fuscicollis
- Buff-breasted sandpiper, Calidris subruficollis
- Pectoral sandpiper, Calidris melanotos
- Semipalmated sandpiper, Calidris pusilla
- Western sandpiper, Calidris mauri (R)
- Short-billed dowitcher, Limnodromus griseus
- Long-billed dowitcher, Limnodromus scolopaceus
- American woodcock, Scolopax minor (B)
- Wilson's snipe, Gallinago delicata (B)
- Spotted sandpiper, Actitis macularia (B)
- Solitary sandpiper, Tringa solitaria (B)
- Lesser yellowlegs, Tringa flavipes
- Willet, Tringa semipalmata (B)
- Greater yellowlegs, Tringa melanoleuca
- Wilson's phalarope, Phalaropus tricolor
- Red-necked phalarope, Phalaropus lobatus
- Red phalarope, Phalaropus fulicarius

== Skuas and jaegers ==
Order: Charadriiformes Family: Stercorariidae

Skuas and jaegers are medium to large seabirds with strongly hooked talons, hooked bills, and webbed feet. They are pelagic birds and feed on a variety of animals—such as fish, bird eggs, and lemmings—by hunting, scavenging, or kleptoparasitizing them.

- Great skua (grand Labbe), Stercorarius skua (R)
- South polar skua (labbe de McCormick), Stercorarius maccormicki (R)
- Pomarine jaeger (labbe pomarin), Stercorarius pomarinus
- Parasitic jaeger (labbe parasite), Stercorarius parasiticus
- Long-tailed jaeger (labbe à longue queue), Stercorarius longicaudus (A)

== Auks, murres, and puffins ==
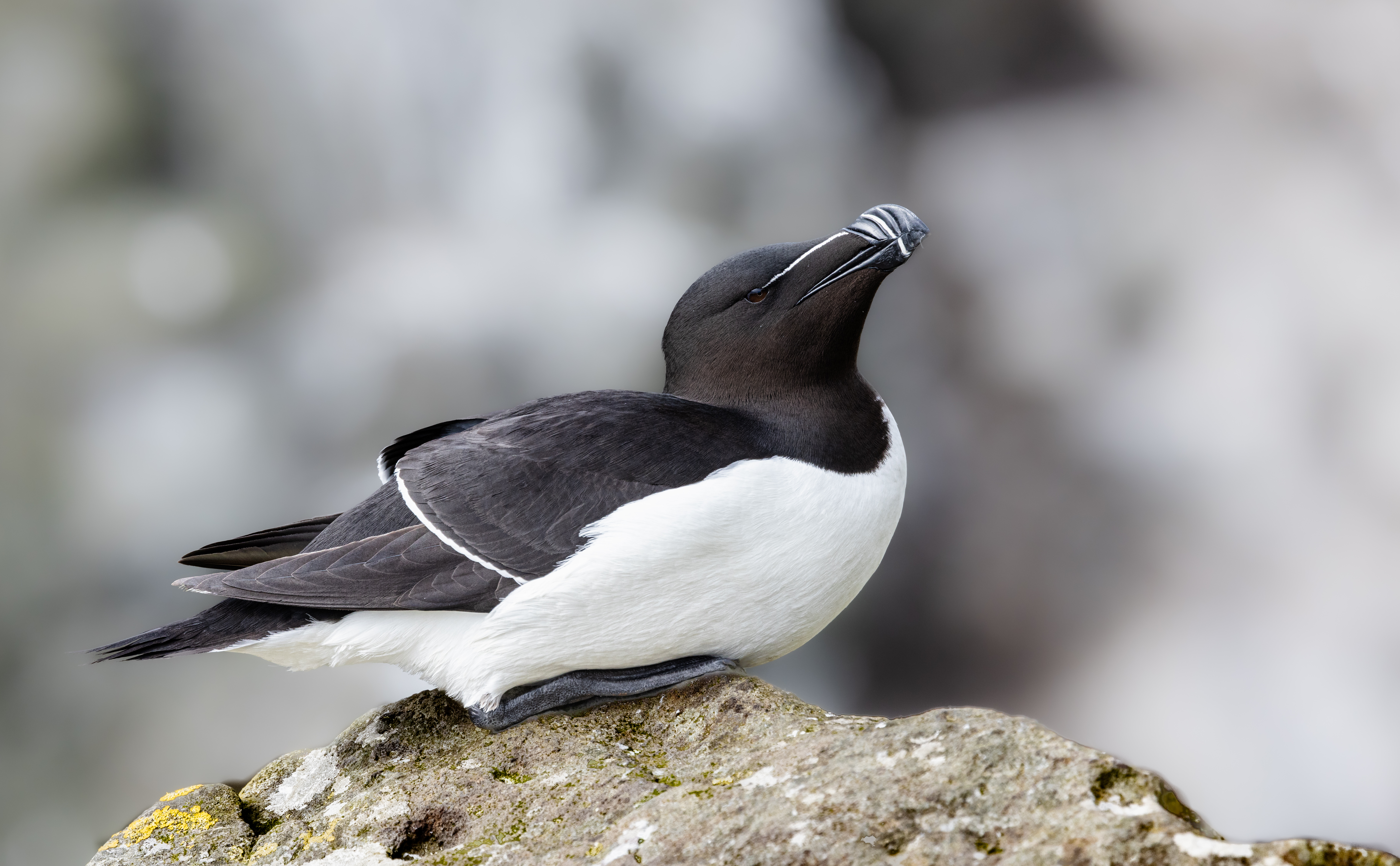
Razorbill

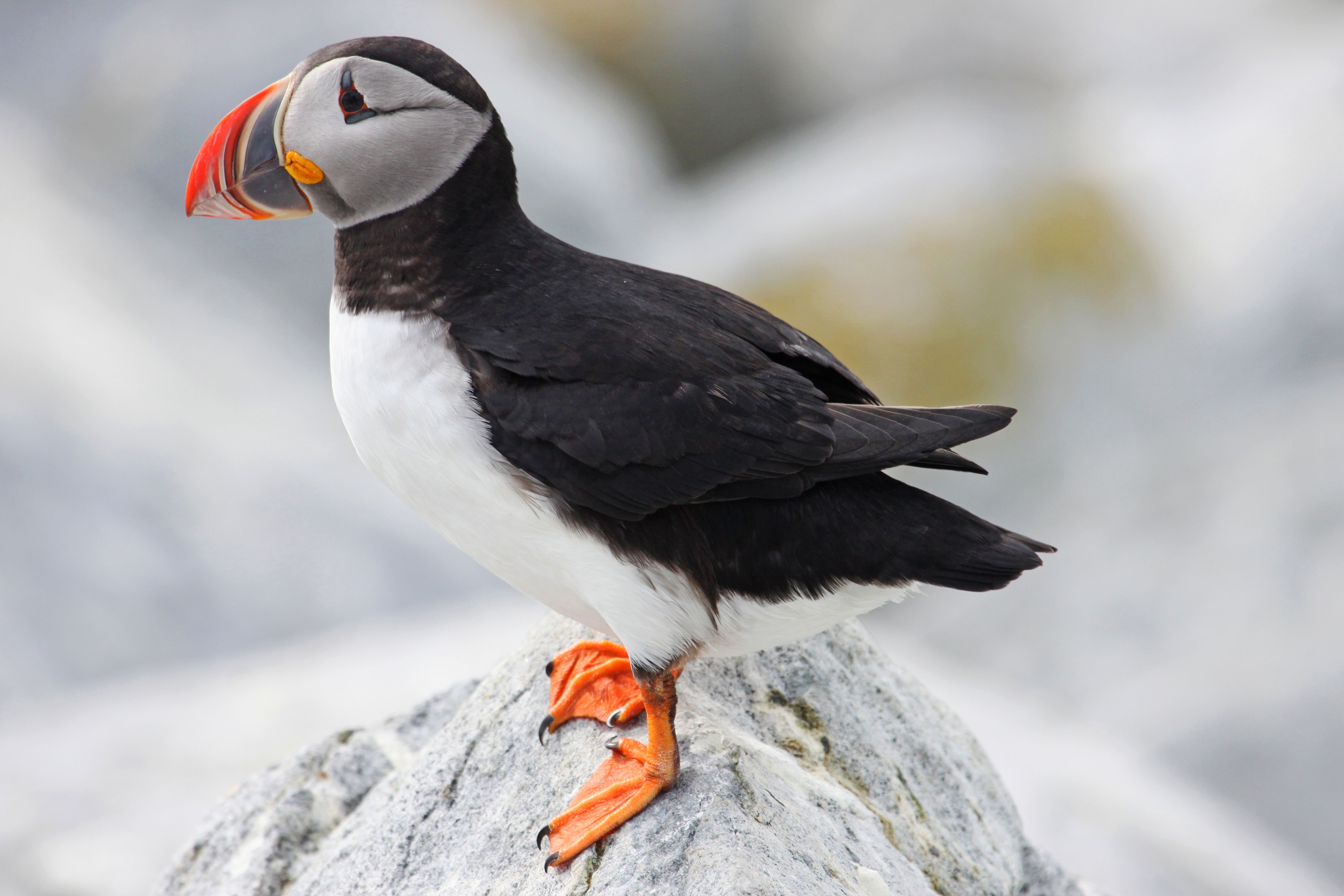
Atlantic puffin

Order: Charadriiformes Family: Alcidae

Alcids are superficially similar to penguins due to their black-and-white colours, their upright posture, and some of their habits, however they are only distantly related to the penguins and are able to fly. Auks live on the open sea, only deliberately coming ashore to nest. Many Atlantic puffins and razorbills nest on Machias Seal Island, which has disputed sovereignty between Canada (New Brunswick) and the United States (Maine).

- Dovekie (mergule nain), Alle alle
- Common murre (guillemot de Troïl), Uria aalge (B)
- Thick-billed murre (guillemot de Brünnich), Uria lomvia
- Razorbill (petit pingouin), Alca torda (B)
- Great auk (grand pingouin), Pinguinus impennis (E)
- Black guillemot (guillemot à miroir), Cepphus grylle (B)
- Ancient murrelet (guillemot à cou blanc), Synthliboramphus antiquus (A)
- Atlantic puffin (macareux moine), Fratercula arctica (B)
- Tufted puffin (macareux huppé), Fratercula cirrhata (A)

== Gulls, terns, and skimmers ==
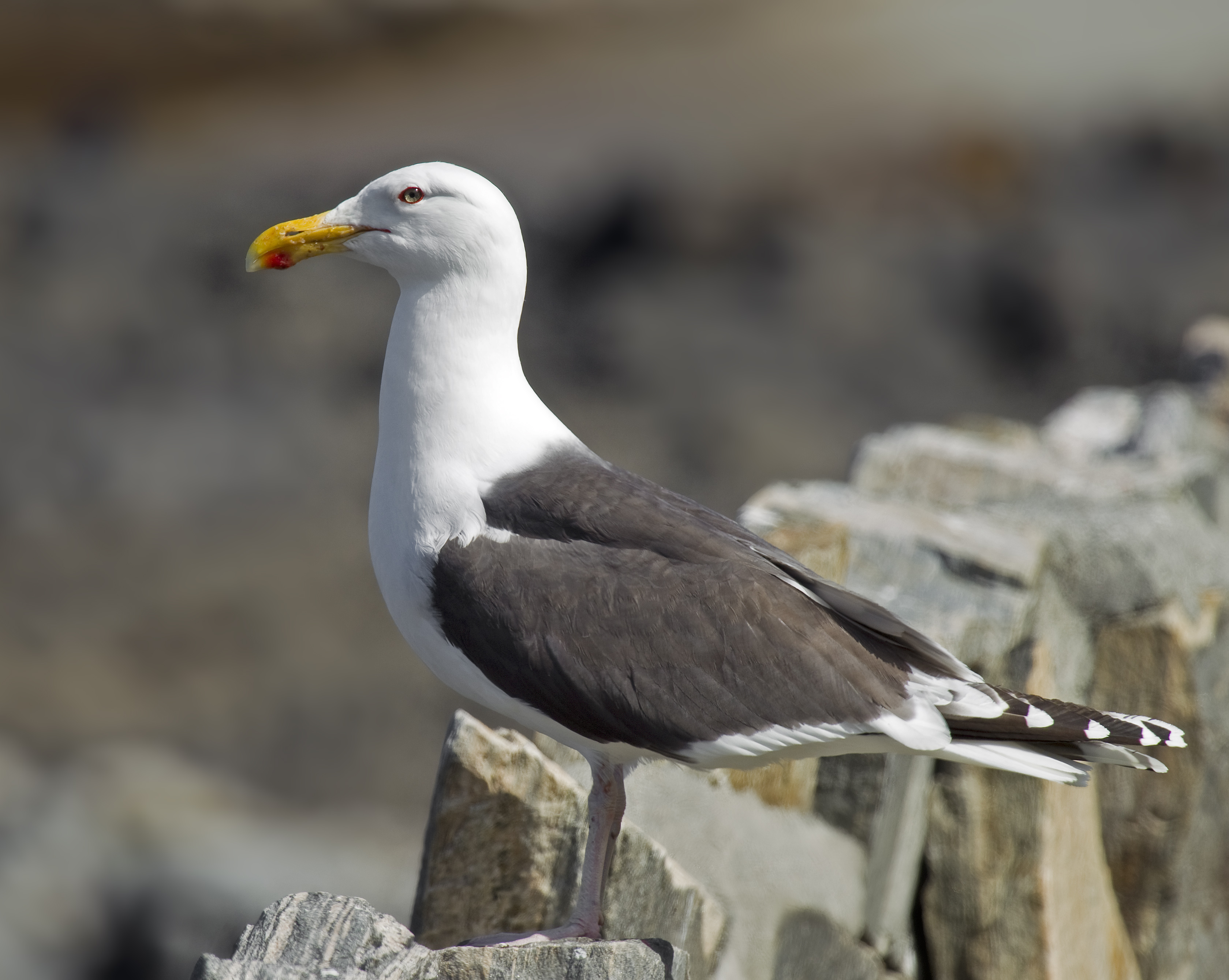
Great black-backed gull

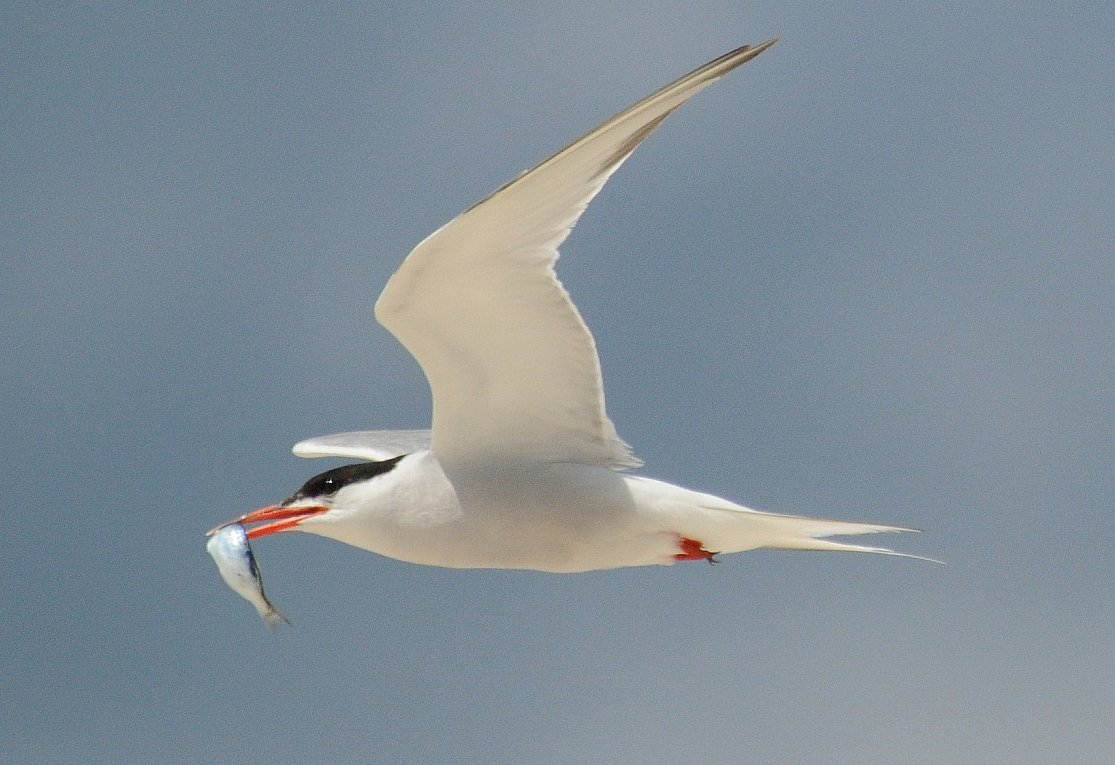
Common tern

Order: Charadriiformes Family: Laridae

Laridae is a family of seabirds and includes gulls, terns, and skimmers. Gulls are typically grey or white, often with black markings on the head or wings. Terns are generally smaller than gulls with more pointed wings and bills, many also having forked tails which help with aerial manoeuvrability. Both species can be found inland near lakes and rivers, however gulls have adapted well to human presence and can often be found in urban centers.

- Black-legged kittiwake, Rissa tridactyla (B)
- Ivory gull, Pagophila eburnea (R)
- Sabine's gull, Xema sabini (R)
- Bonaparte's gull, Chroicocephalus philadelphia
- Black-headed gull, Chroicocephalus ridibundus
- Little gull, Hydrocoleus minutus
- Laughing gull, Leucophaeus atricilla (B)
- Franklin's gull, Leucophaeus pipixcan (R)
- Common gull, Larus canus (R)
- Short-billed gull, Larus brachyrhynchus (A)
- Ring-billed gull, Larus delawarensis (B)
- California gull, Larus californicus (A)
- Herring gull, Larus argentatus (B)
- Iceland gull, Larus glaucoides
- Lesser black-backed gull, Larus fuscus
- Slaty-backed gull, Larus schistisagus (A)
- Glaucous gull, Larus hyperboreus
- Great black-backed gull, Larus marinus (B)
- Sooty tern, Onychoprion fuscatus (A)
- Bridled tern, Onychoprion anaethetus (A)
- Least tern, Sternula antillarum (A)
- Gull-billed tern, Gelochelidon nilotica (A)
- Caspian tern, Hydroprogne caspia
- Black tern, Chlidonias niger (B)
- White-winged tern, Chlidonias leucopterus (A)
- Roseate tern, Sterna dougallii (B)
- Common tern, Sterna hirundo (B)
- Arctic tern, Sterna paradisaea (B)
- Forster's tern, Sterna forsteri (R)
- Royal tern, Thalasseus maximus (A)
- Sandwich tern, Thalasseus sandvicensis (A)
- Black skimmer, Rynchops niger (A)

== Tropicbirds ==
Order: Phaethontiformes Family: Phaethontidae

Tropicbirds are tropical seabirds with exceptionally long central tail feathers. They are slender and have a white plumage, with long wings that have black markings, as does the head.

- Red-billed tropicbird (phaéton à bec rouge), Phaethon aethereus (A)

== Loons ==
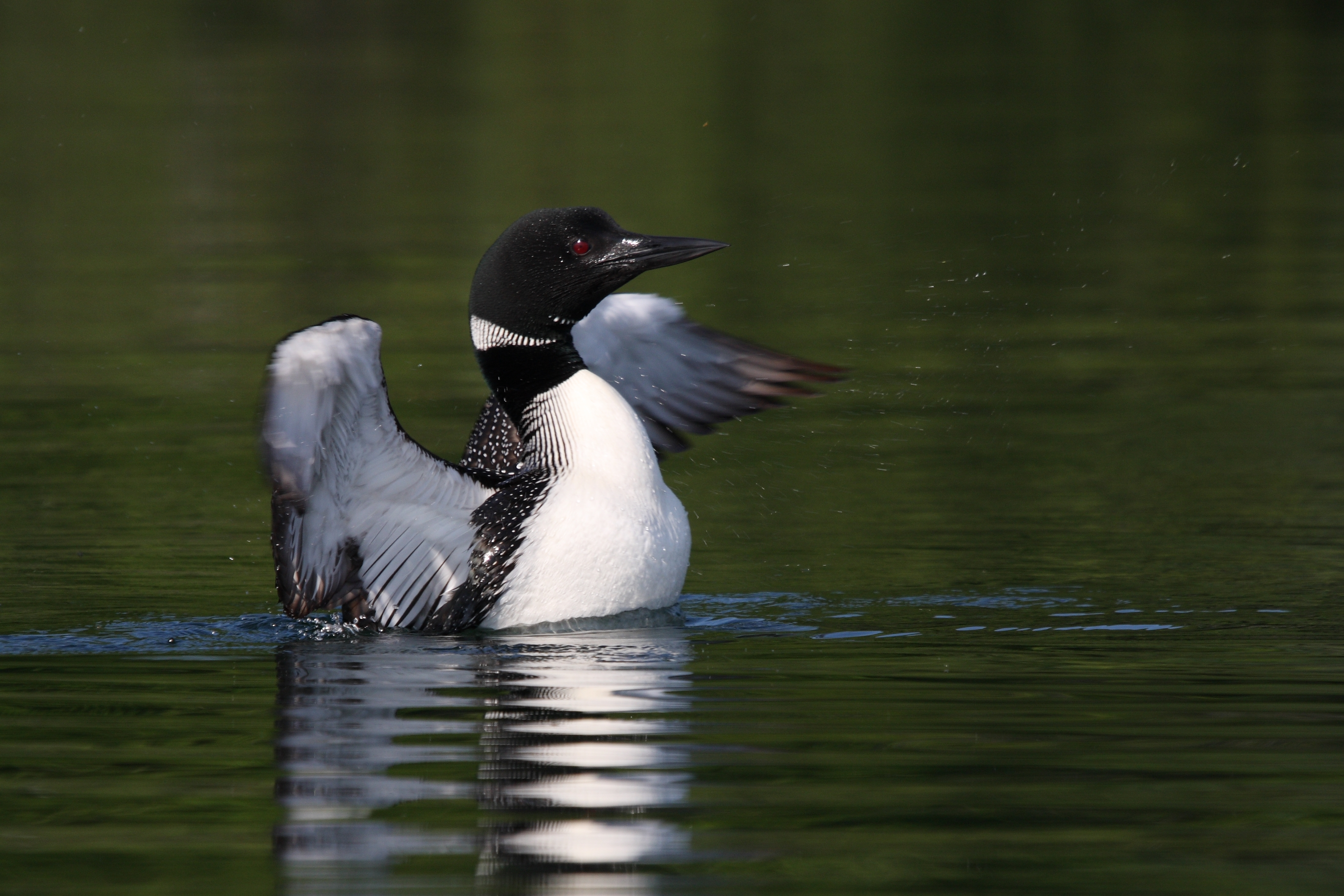
Common loon

Order: Gaviiformes Family: Gaviidae

Loons are aquatic birds, the size of a large duck, to which they are unrelated. Their plumage is largely grey or black, and they have spear-shaped bills. Loons swim well and fly adequately, but are almost hopeless on land, because their legs are placed towards the rear of the body.

- Red-throated loon (plongeon catmarin), Gavia stellata
- Pacific loon (plongeon du Pacifique), Gavia pacifica (A)
- Common loon (plongeon huard), Gavia immer (B)

== Albatrosses ==
Order: Procellariiformes Family: Diomedeidae

Albatrosses are pelagic seabirds, and are amongst the largest of flying birds, with some of the longest wingspans of any extant birds. They are mostly found on the ocean surface, and primarily feed on squid and fish.

- Yellow-nosed albatross (albatros à nez jaune de l'océan Atlantique), Thalassarche chlororhynchos (A)
- Black-browed albatross (albatros à sourcils noirs), Thalassarche melanophris (A)

== Southern storm-petrels ==
Order: Procellariiformes Family: Oceanitidae

Storm-petrels are the smallest seabirds, relatives of the petrels, feeding on planktonic crustaceans and small fish picked from the surface, typically while hovering. The flight is fluttering and sometimes bat-like. Until 2018, this family's three species were included with the other storm-petrels in family Hydrobatidae.

- Wilson's storm-petrel (océanite de Wilson), Oceanites oceanicus

== Northern storm-petrels ==
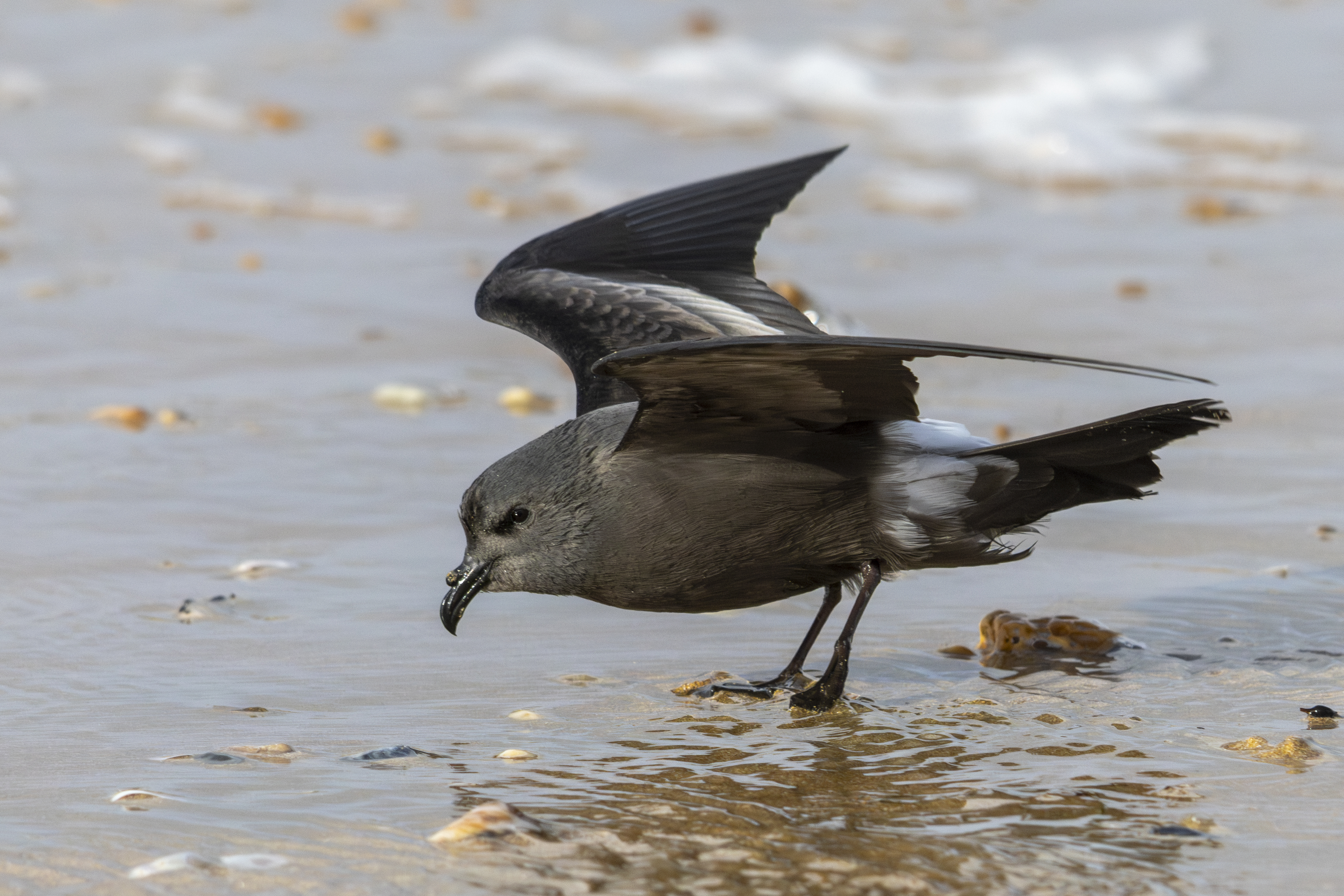
Leach's storm-petrel

Order: Procellariiformes Family: Hydrobatidae

Though the members of this family are similar in many respects to the southern storm-petrels, including their general appearance and habits, there are enough genetic differences to warrant their placement in a separate family.

- Leach's storm-petrel (océanite cul-blanc), Hydrobates leucorhous (B)

== Shearwaters and petrels ==
Order: Procellariiformes Family: Procellariidae

Procellariids are the main group of medium-sized "true petrels", characterized by united nostrils with medium septum and a long outer functional primary.

- Northern fulmar (fulmar boréal), Fulmarus glacialis
- Cory's shearwater (puffin cendré), Calonectris diomedea (R)
- Sooty shearwater (puffin fuligineux), Ardenna griseus
- Great shearwater (puffin majeur), Ardenna gravis
- Manx shearwater (puffin des Anglais), Puffinus puffinus
- Sargasso shearwater (puffin d'Audubon), Puffinus lherminieri (A)

== Storks ==
Order: Ciconiiformes Family: Ciconiidae

Storks are large, heavy, long-legged, long-necked wading birds with long stout bills and wide wingspans. They lack the powder down that other wading birds such as herons, spoonbills and ibises use to clean off fish slime. Storks have underdeveloped syrinxes, and are either mostly or fully mute as a result.

- Wood stork (tantale d'Amérique), Mycteria americana (A)

== Frigatebirds ==
Order: Suliformes Family: Fregatidae

Frigatebirds are large seabirds usually found over tropical oceans. They are either black or black-and-white in colour, with long wings and deeply forked tails. Males have coloured inflatable throat pouches used for attracting a female. Their large wingspan allows for them to be essentially aerial, being able to stay aloft for weeks. They lack waterproofing feathers, and cannot swim as a result. They often feed by stealing from other seabirds.

- Magnificent frigatebird (frégate superbe), Fregata magnificens (A)

== Boobies and gannets ==
Order: Suliformes Family: Sulidae

The family Sulidae includes gannets and boobies. Both groups are medium-large coastal seabirds that plunge-dive for fish.

- Brown booby (fou brun), Sula leucogaster (A)
- Northern gannet (fou de Bassan), Morus bassanus

== Cormorants and shags ==
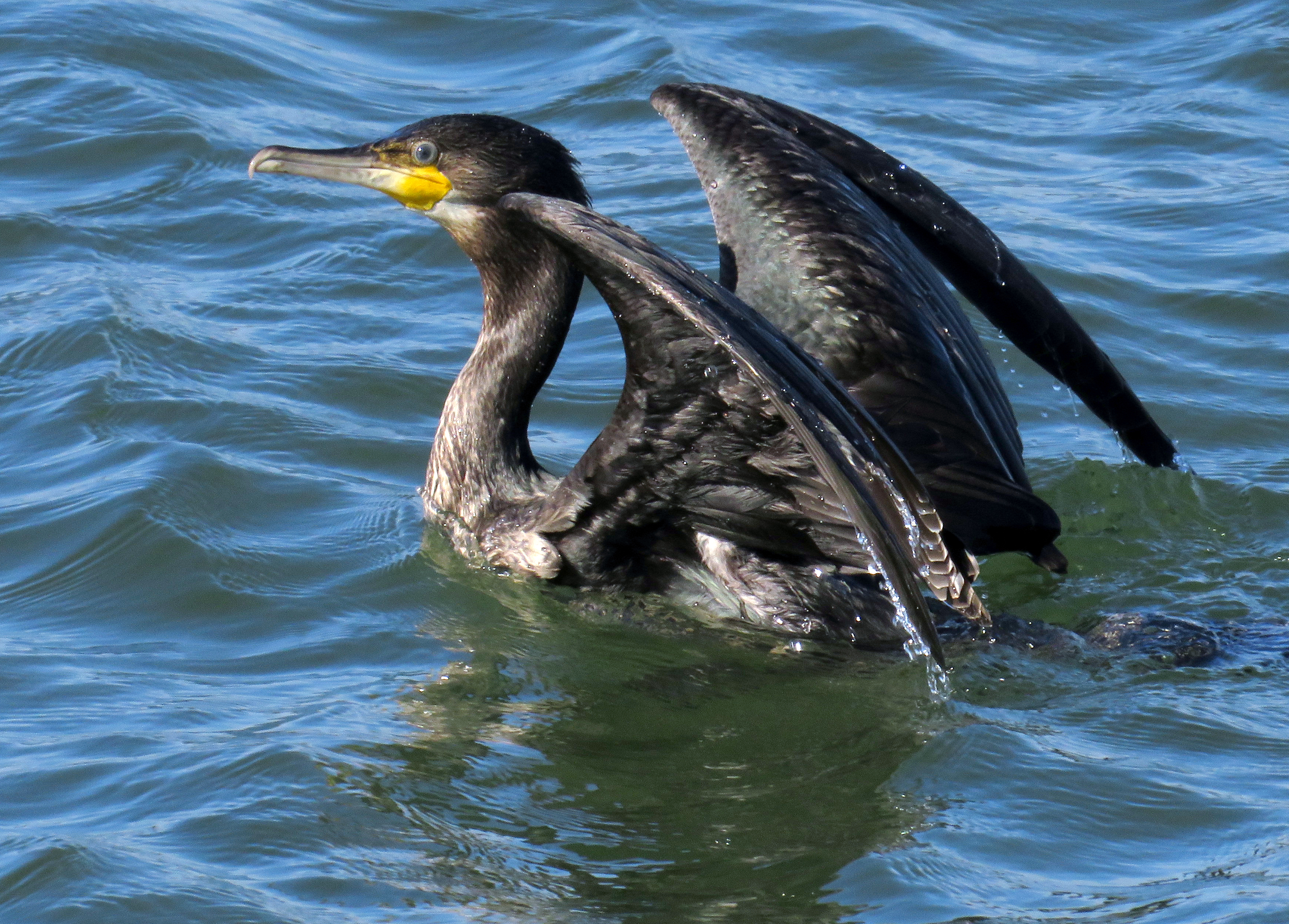
Great cormorant

Order: Suliformes Family: Phalacrocoracidae

Cormorants are medium-to-large aquatic birds, usually with mainly dark plumage and areas of coloured skin on the face. The bill is long, thin, and sharply hooked. Their feet are four-toed and webbed.

- Great cormorant (grand cormoran), Phalacrocorax carbo (B)
- Double-crested cormorant (cormoran à aigrettes), Nannopterum auritum

== Pelicans ==
Order: Pelecaniformes Family: Pelecanidae

Pelicans are very large water birds with a distinctive pouch under their beak. Like other birds in the order Pelecaniformes, they have four webbed toes.

- American white pelican (pélican d'Amérique), Pelecanus erythrorhynchos (R)
- Brown pelican (pélican brun), Pelecanus occidentalis (A)

== Herons, egrets, and bitterns ==
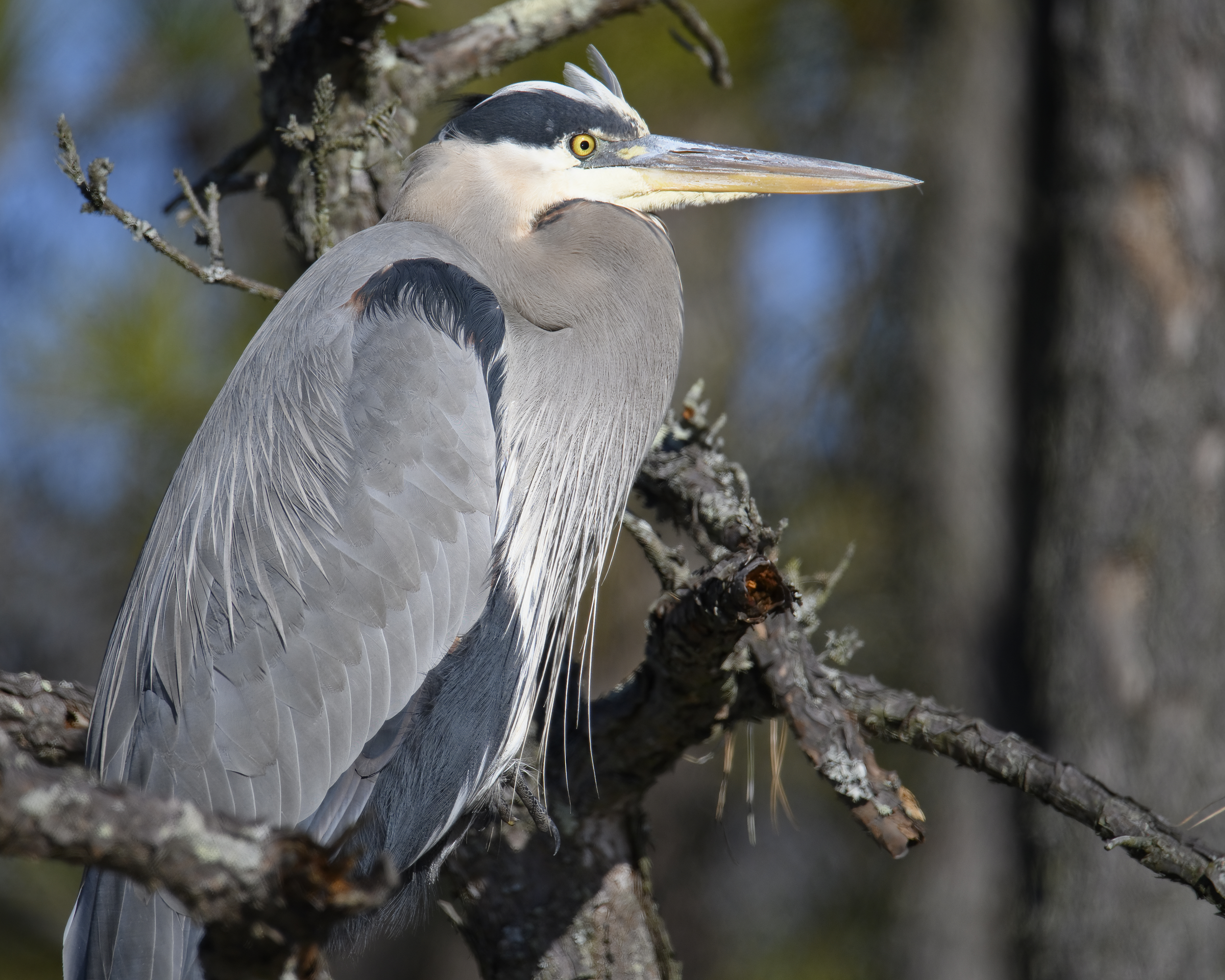
Great blue heron

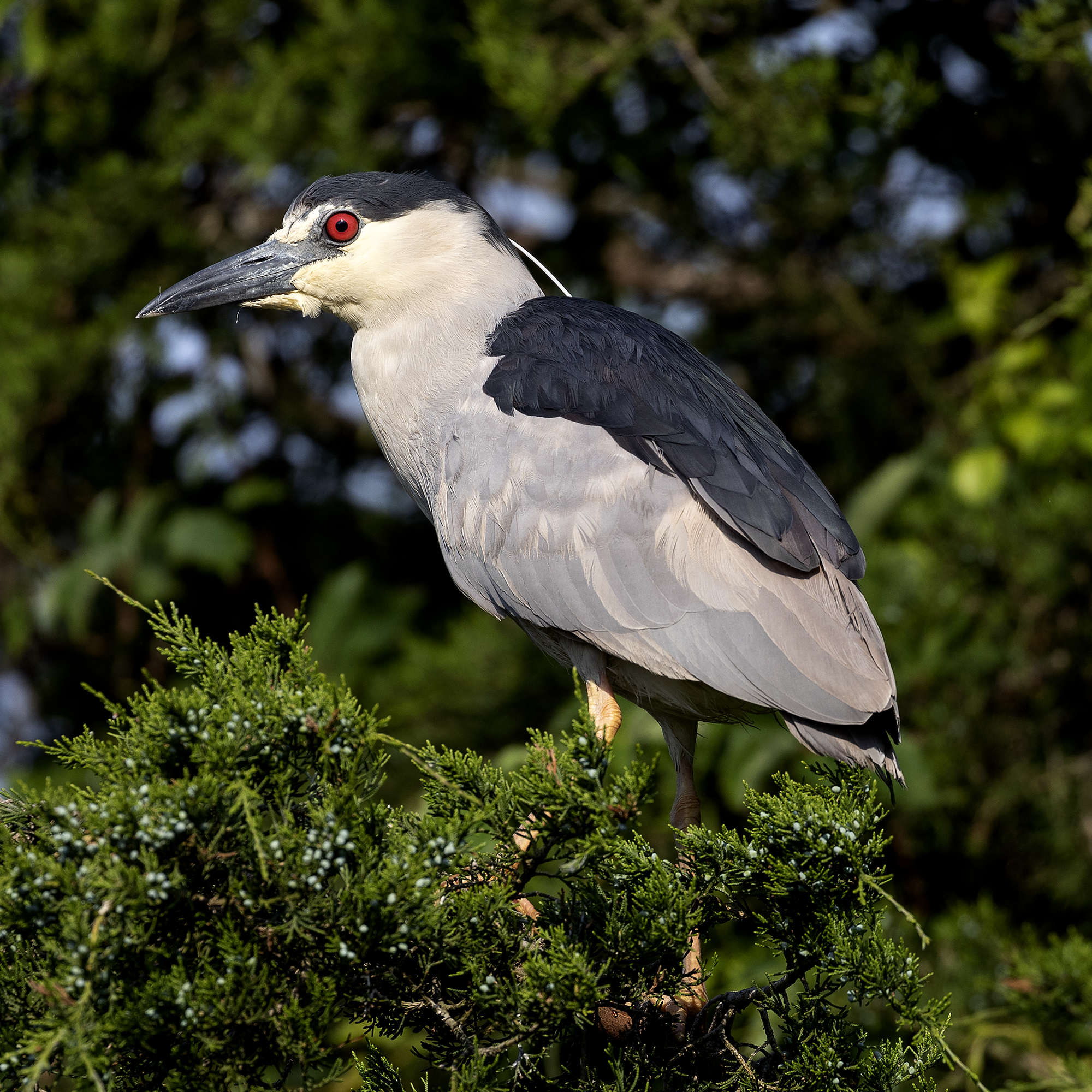
Black-crowned night heron

Order: Pelecaniformes Family: Ardeidae

The family Ardeidae contains the herons, egrets, and bitterns. Herons and egrets are medium to large wading birds with long necks and legs. Bitterns tend to be shorter necked and more secretive. Members of Ardeidae fly with their necks retracted, unlike other long-necked birds such as storks, ibises, and spoonbills.

- American bittern, Botaurus lentiginosus (B)
- Least bittern, Ixobrychus exilis (B)
- Great blue heron, Ardea herodias (B)
- Great egret, Ardea alba
- Little egret, Egretta garzetta (A)
- Snowy egret, Egretta thula
- Little blue heron, Egretta caerulea
- Tricolored heron, Egretta tricolor (R)
- Cattle egret, Bubulcus ibis
- Green heron, Butorides virescens (B)
- Black-crowned night heron, Nycticorax nycticorax (B)
- Yellow-crowned night heron, Nyctanassa violacea (R)

== Ibises and spoonbills ==
Order: Pelecaniformes Family: Threskiornithidae

The family Threskiornithidae includes the ibises and spoonbills. They have long, broad wings. Their bodies tend to be elongated, the neck more so, with rather long legs. The bill is also long, downwardly curved in the case of the ibises, straight and distinctively flattened in the spoonbills.

- White ibis (ibis blanc), Eudocimus albus (A)
- Glossy ibis (ibis falcinelle), Plegadis falcinellus
- Roseate spoonbill (spatule rosée), Platalea ajaja (A)

== New World vultures ==
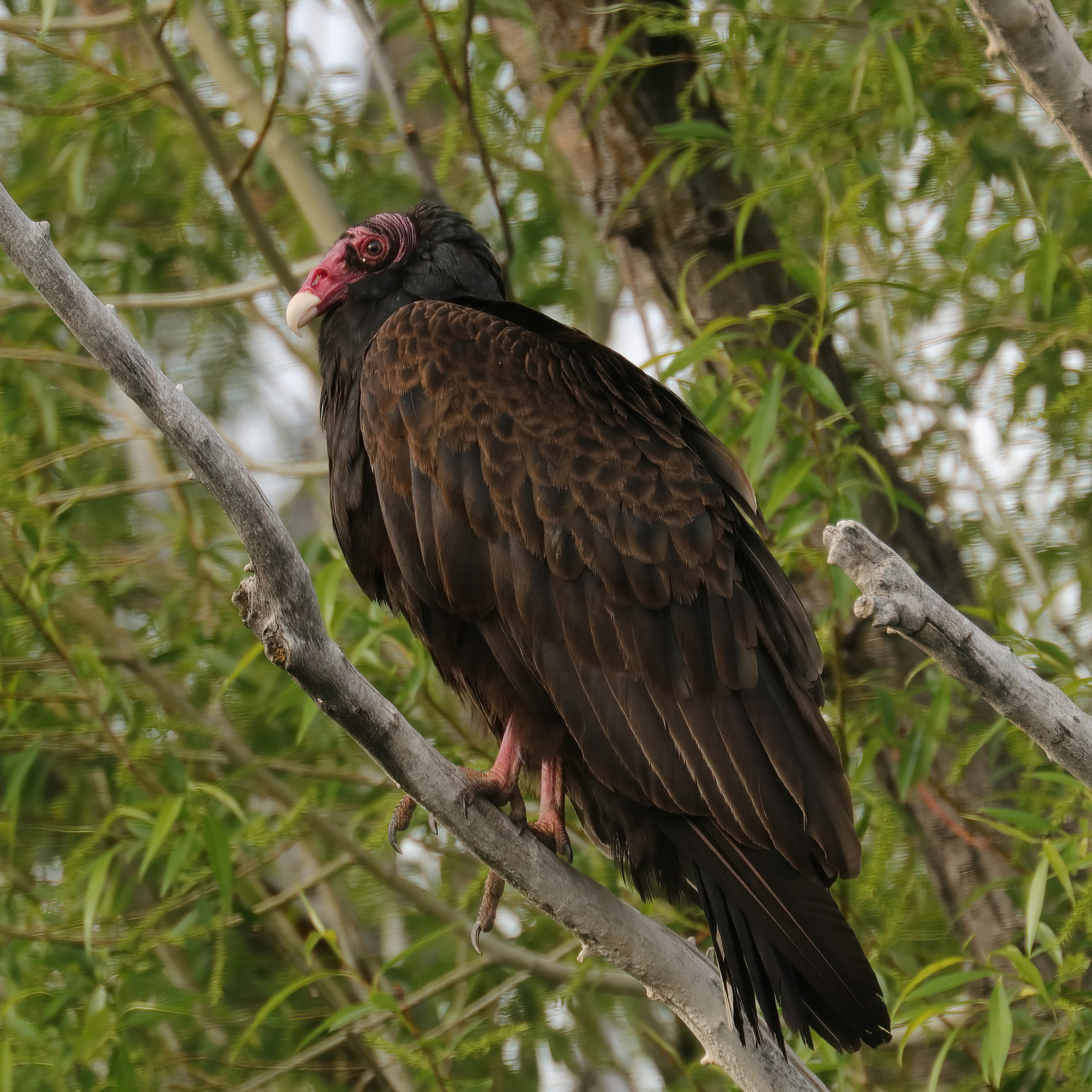
Turkey vulture

Order: Cathartiformes Family: Cathartidae

The New World vultures are not closely related to Old World vultures, but superficially resemble them because of convergent evolution. Like the Old World vultures, they are scavengers. However, unlike Old World vultures, which find carcasses by sight, New World vultures have a good sense of smell with which they locate carcasses.

- Black vulture (urubu noir), Coragyps atratus (R)
- Turkey vulture (urubu à tête rouge), Cathartes aura (B)

== Osprey ==
Order: Accipitriformes Family: Pandionidae

Pandionidae is a family of fish-eating birds of prey possessing a very large, powerful hooked beak for tearing flesh from their prey, strong legs, powerful talons, and keen eyesight. The family is monotypic.

- Osprey (balbuzard pêcheur), Pandion haliaetus (B)

== Hawks, eagles, and kites ==
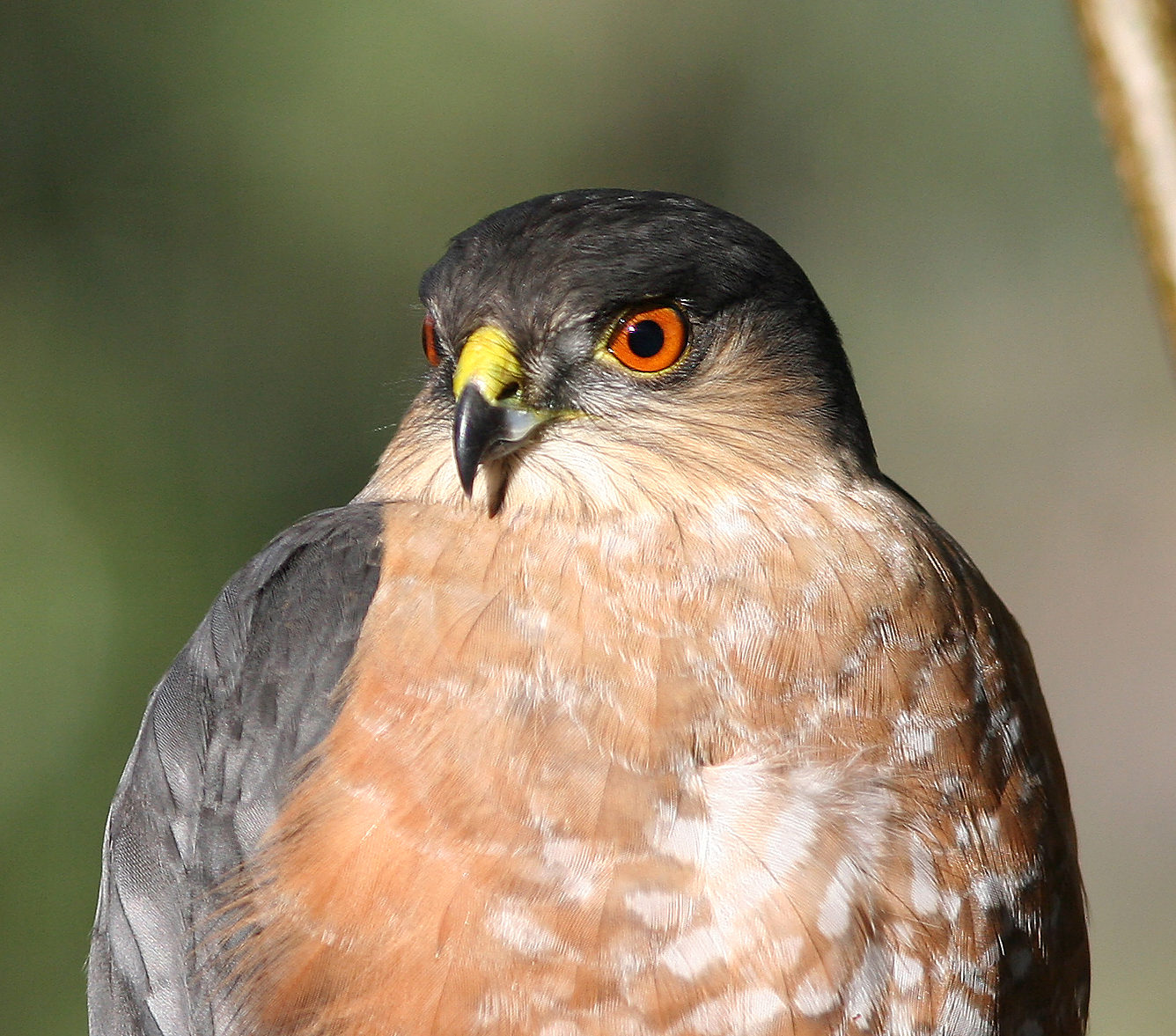
Sharp-shinned hawk

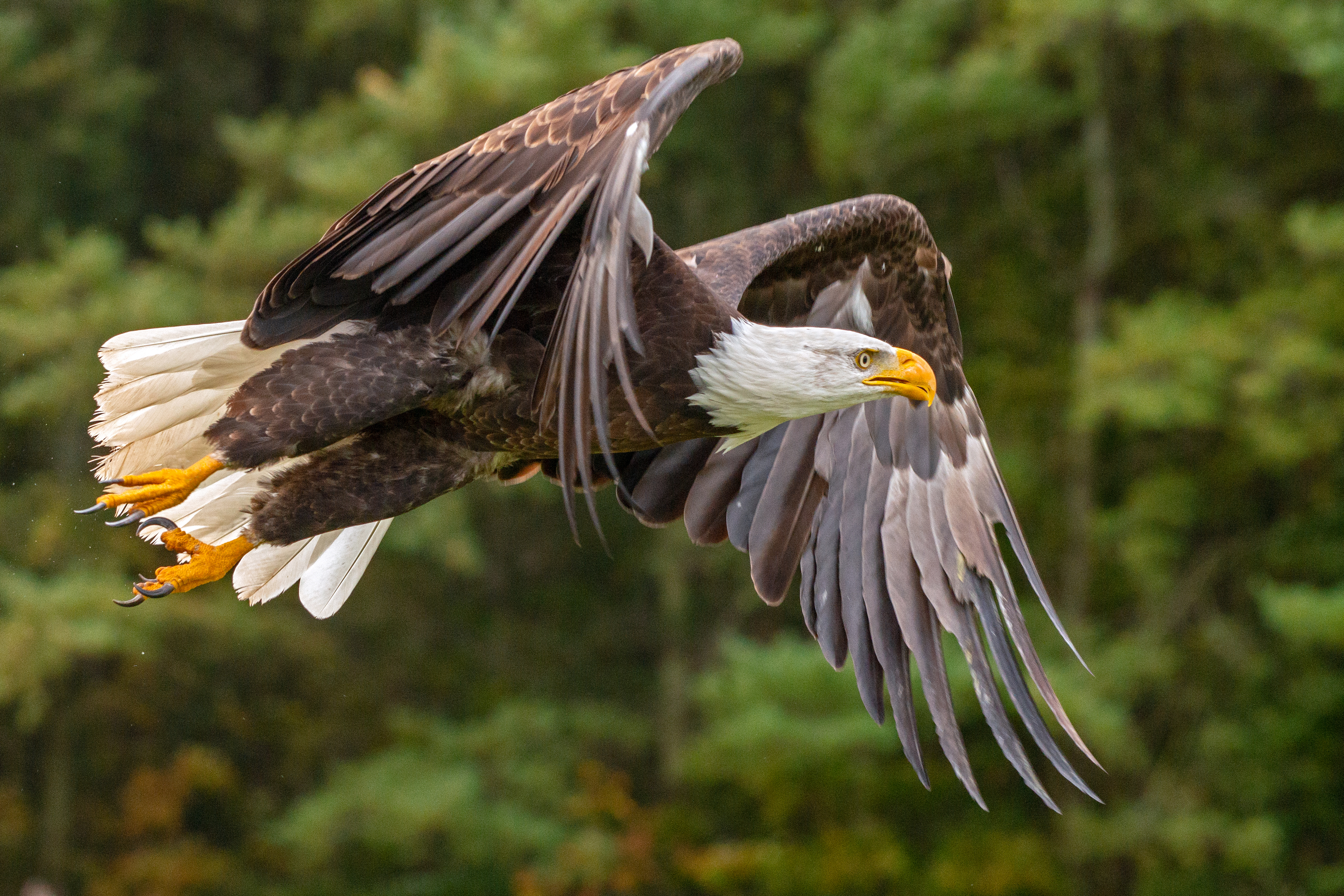
Bald eagle

Order: Accipitriformes Family: Accipitridae

Accipitridae is a family of birds of prey which includes hawks, eagles, kites, harriers, and Old World vultures. These birds have very large powerful hooked beaks for tearing flesh from their prey, strong legs, powerful talons, and keen eyesight.

- Swallow-tailed kite, Elanoides forficatus (A)
- Golden eagle, Aquila chrysaetos
- Northern harrier, Circus hudsonius (B)
- Sharp-shinned hawk, Accipiter striatus (B)
- Cooper's hawk, Accipiter cooperii (B)
- American goshawk, Accipiter atricapillus (B)
- Bald eagle, Haliaeetus leucocephalus (B)
- Steller's sea-eagle, Haliaeetus pelagicus (A)
- Red-shouldered hawk, Buteo lineatus (B)
- Broad-winged hawk, Buteo platypterus (B)
- Swainson's hawk, Buteo swainsoni (A)
- Red-tailed hawk, Buteo jamaicensis (B)
- Rough-legged hawk, Buteo lagopus

== Barn-owls ==
Order: Strigiformes Family: Tytonidae

Owls in the family Tytonidae are medium to large owls, with large heads and characteristic heart-shaped faces.

- Barn owl (effraie des clochers), Tyto Alba (R)

== Owls ==
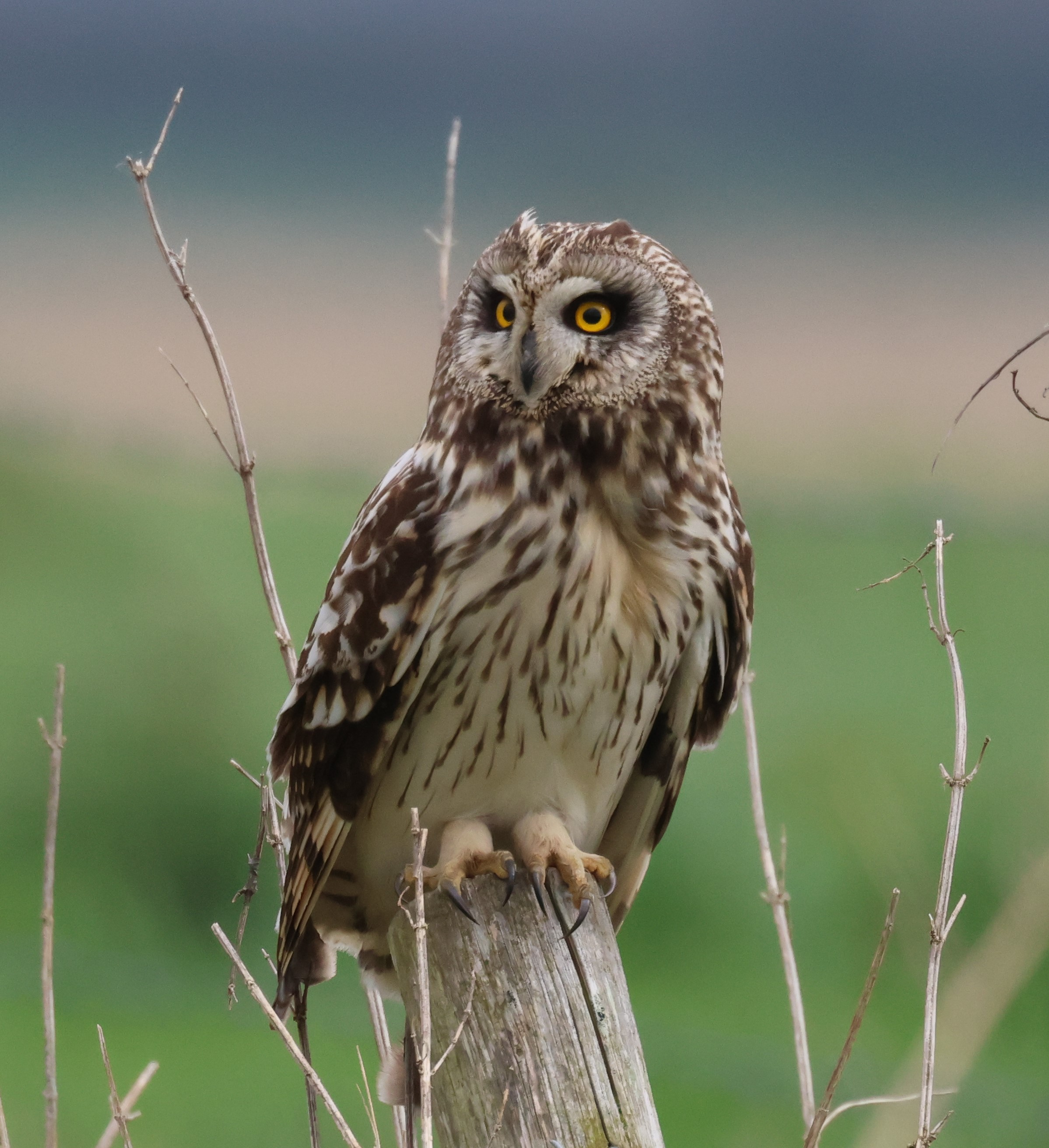
Short-eared owl

Order: Strigiformes Family: Strigidae

Typical owls are small to large solitary nocturnal birds of prey. They have large forward-facing eyes and ears, a hawk-like beak, and a conspicuous circle of feathers around each eye called a facial disk.

- Eastern screech-owl, Megascops asio (R)
- Great horned owl, Bubo virginianus (B)
- Snowy owl, Bubo scandiacus
- Northern hawk owl, Surnia ulula
- Burrowing owl, Athene cunicularia (A)
- Barred owl, Strix varia (B)
- Great grey owl, Strix nebulosa (R)
- Long-eared owl, Asio otus (B)
- Short-eared owl, Asio flammeus (B)
- Boreal owl, Aegolius funereus
- Northern saw-whet owl, Aegolius acadicus (B)

== Kingfishers ==
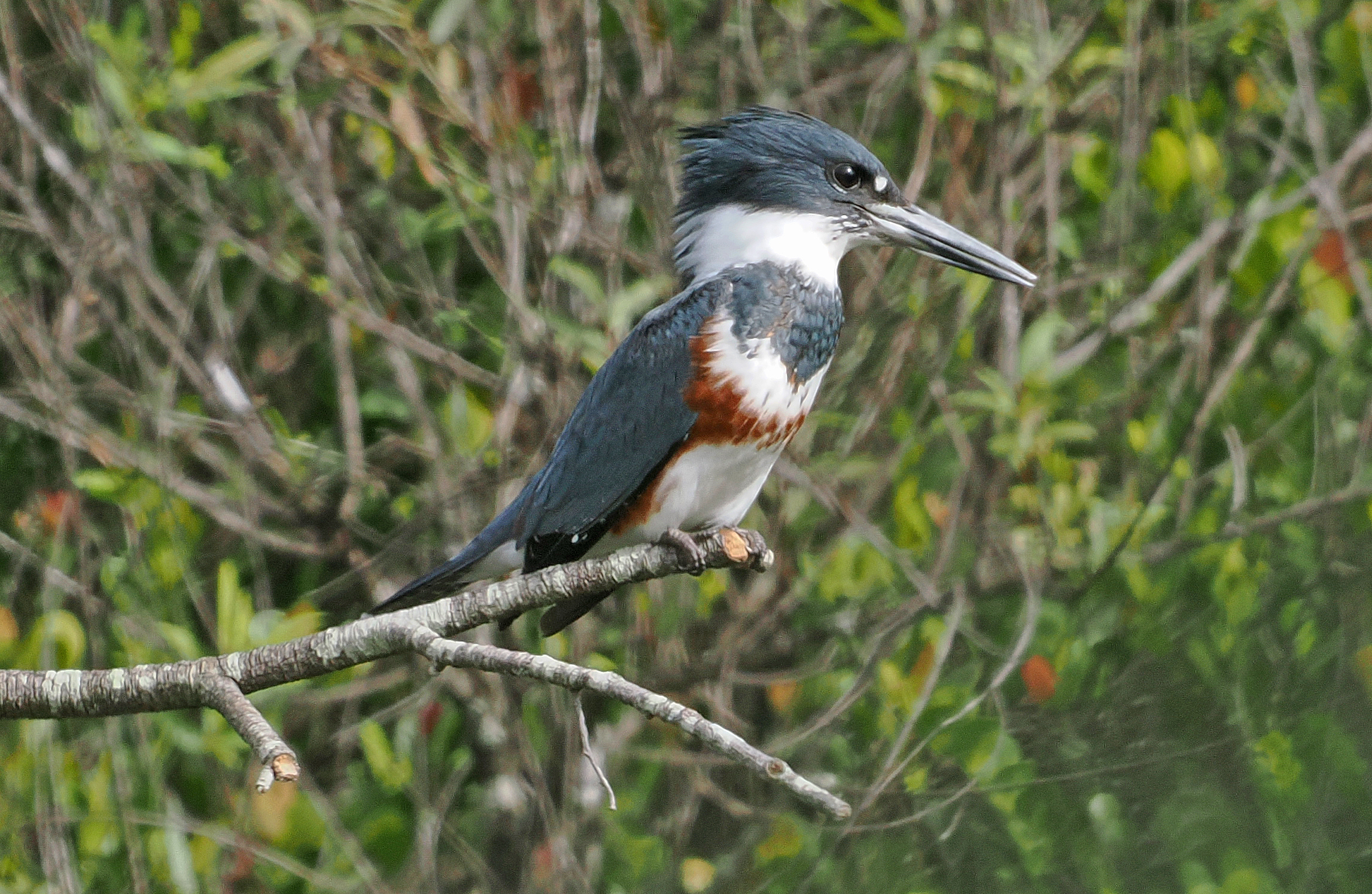
Belted kingfisher

Order: Coraciiformes Family: Alcedinidae

Kingfishers are medium-sized birds with large heads, long, pointed bills, short legs, and stubby tails.

- Belted kingfisher (martin-pêcheur d'Amérique), Megaceryle alcyon (B)

== Woodpeckers ==
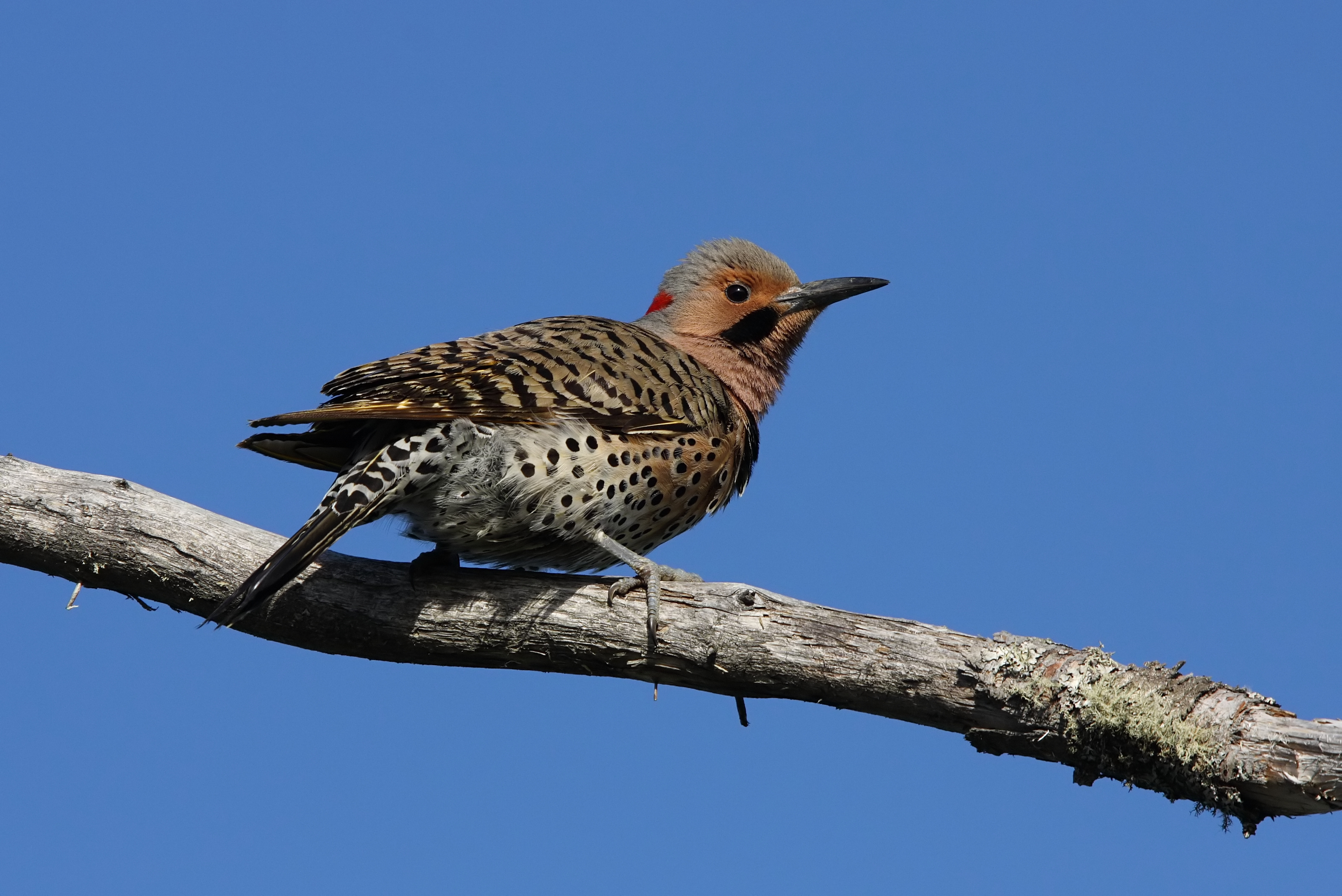
Northern flicker

Order: Piciformes Family: Picidae

Woodpeckers are small to medium-sized birds with chisel-like beaks, short legs, stiff tails, and long tongues used for capturing insects. Some species have feet with two toes pointing forward and two backward, while several species have only three toes. Many woodpeckers have the habit of tapping noisily on tree trunks with their beaks.

- Red-headed woodpecker (pic à tête rouge), Melanerpes erythrocephalus
- Red-bellied woodpecker (pic à ventre roux), Melanerpes carolinus
- Yellow-bellied sapsucker (pic maculé), Sphyrapicus varius (B)
- American three-toed woodpecker (pic à dos rayé), Picoides dorsalis (B)
- Black-backed woodpecker (pic à dos noir), Picoides arcticus (B)
- Downy woodpecker (pic mineur), Dryobates pubescens (B)
- Hairy woodpecker (pic chevelu), Dryobates villosus (B)
- Northern flicker (pic flamboyant), Colaptes auratus (B)
- Pileated woodpecker (grand pic), Dryocopus pileatus (B)

== Falcons and caracaras ==
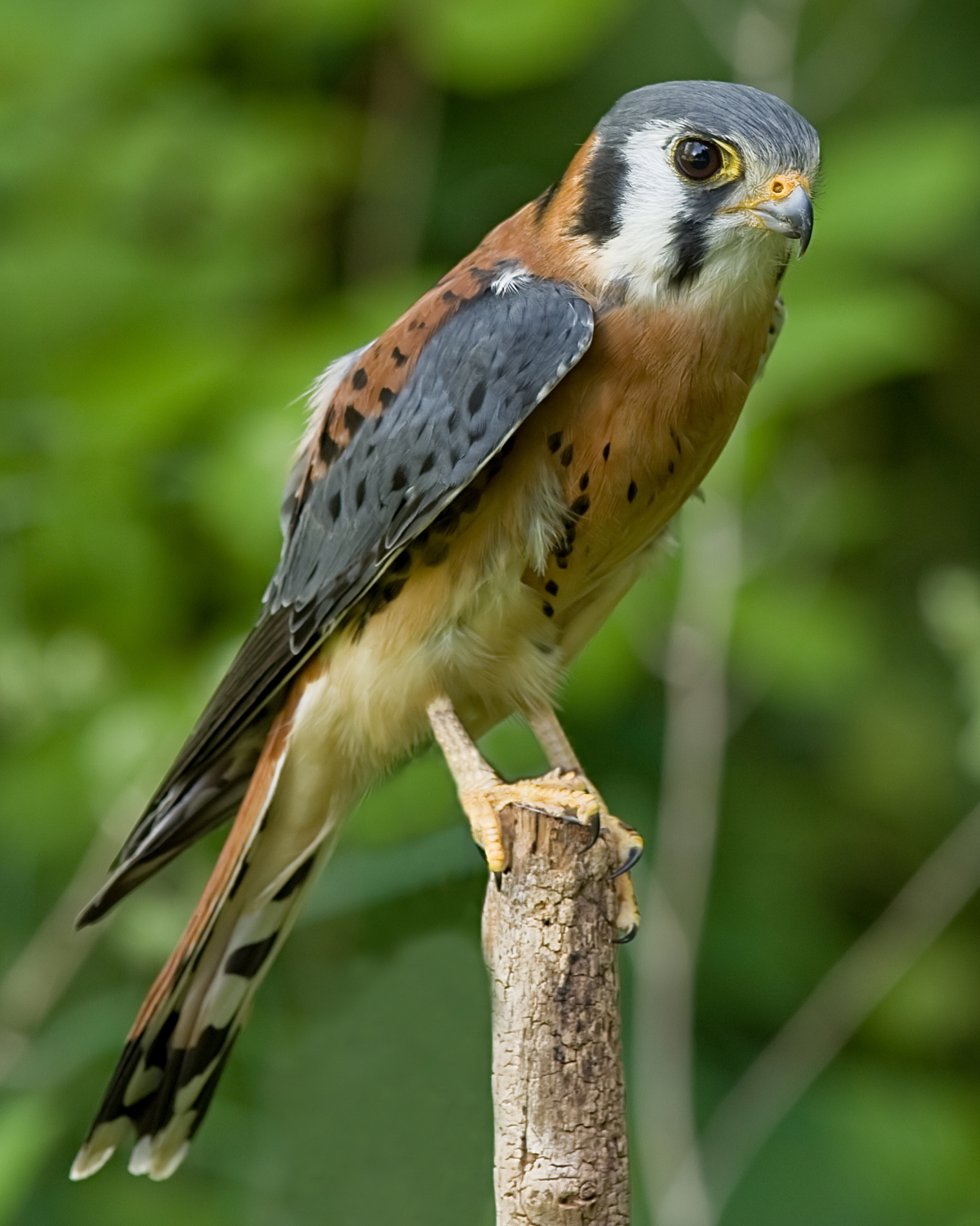
American kestrel

Order: Falconiformes Family: Falconidae

Falconidae is a family of diurnal birds of prey, notably the falcons and caracaras. They differ from hawks, eagles, and kites in that they kill with their beaks instead of their talons.

- Crested caracara, Caracara plancus (A)
- Eurasian kestrel, Falco tinnunculus (A)
- American kestrel, Falco sparverius (B)
- Merlin, Falco columbarius (B)
- Gyrfalcon, Falco rusticolus
- Peregrine falcon, Falco peregrinus (B)

== Tyrant flycatchers ==
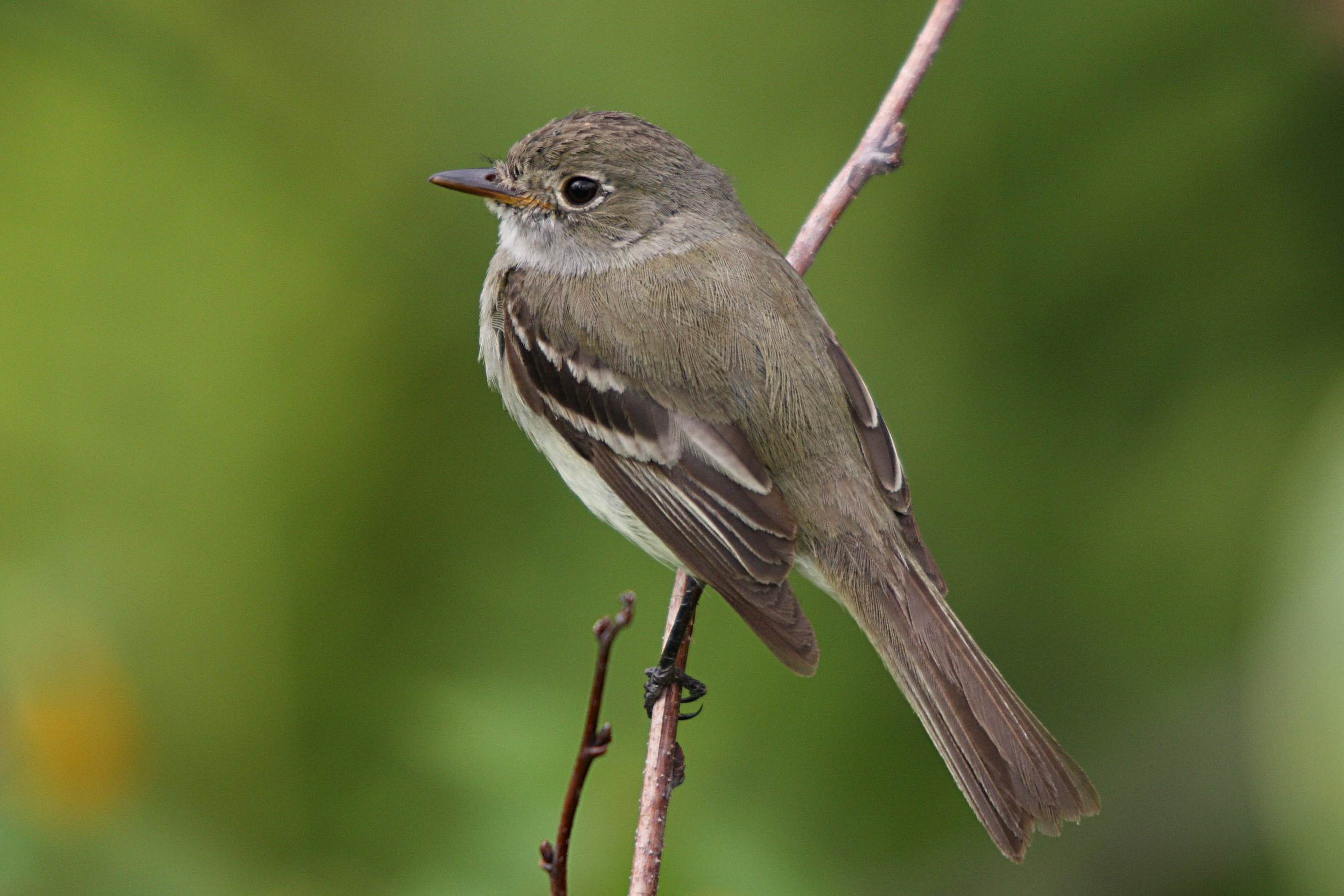
Alder flycatcher

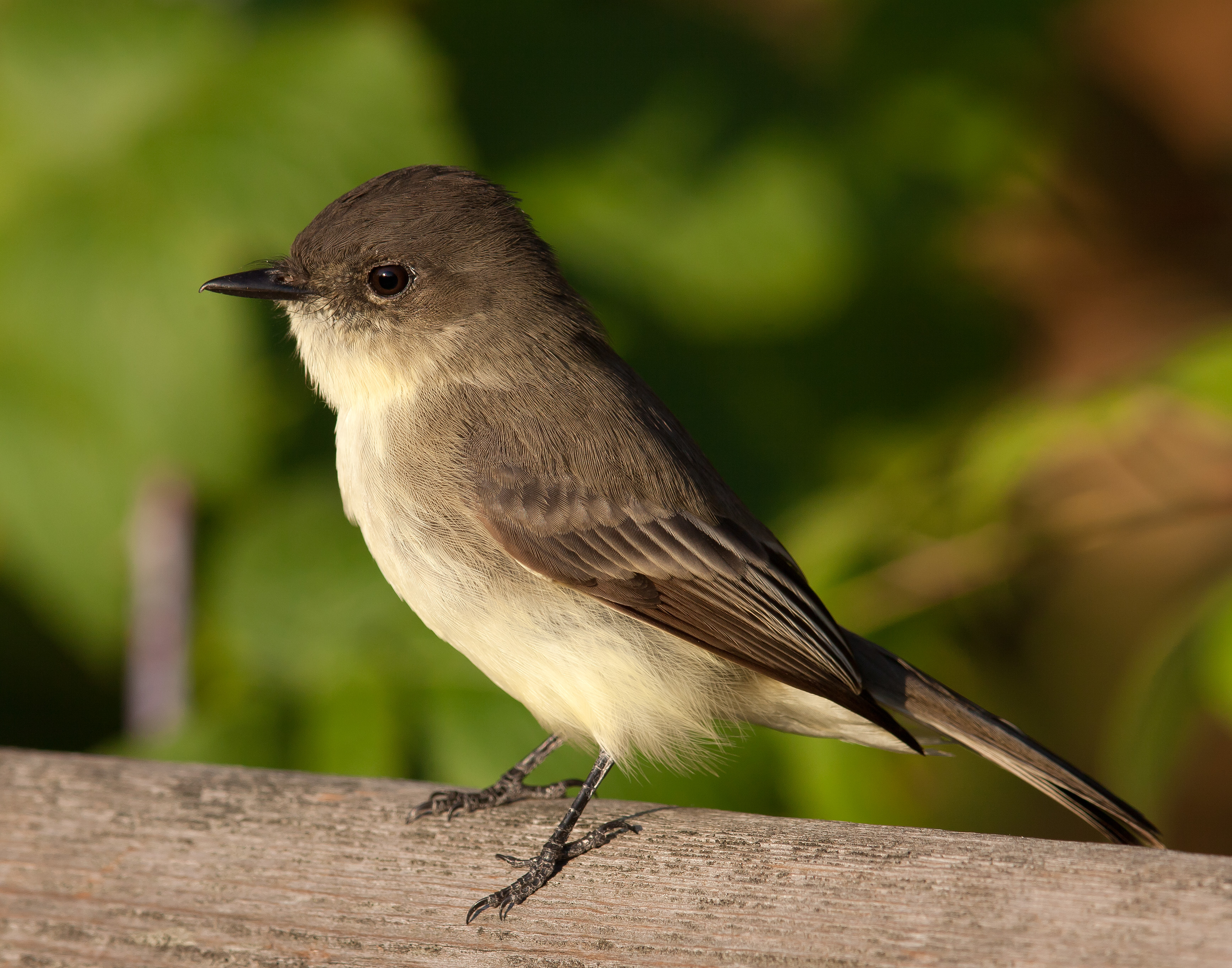
Eastern phoebe

Order: Passeriformes Family: Tyrannidae

Tyrant flycatchers are passerine birds which occur throughout North and South America. They superficially resemble the Old World flycatchers, but are more robust and have stronger bills. They do not have the sophisticated vocal capabilities of the songbirds. Most, but not all, are rather plain. As the name implies, most are insectivorous.

- Ash-throated flycatcher, Myiarchus cinerascens (R)
- Great crested flycatcher, Myiarchus crinitus (B)
- Sulphur-bellied flycatcher, Myiodynastes luteiventris (A)
- Tropical kingbird, Tyrannus melancholicus (A)
- Thick-billed kingbird, Tyrannus crassirostris (A)
- Western kingbird, Tyrannus verticalis
- Eastern kingbird, Tyrannus tyrannus (B)
- Grey kingbird, Tyrannus dominicensis (A)
- Scissor-tailed flycatcher, Tyrannus forficatus (R)
- Fork-tailed flycatcher, Tyrannus savana (R)
- Olive-sided flycatcher, Contopus cooperi (B)
- Eastern wood-pewee, Contopus virens (B)
- Yellow-bellied flycatcher, Empidonax flaviventris (B)
- Acadian flycatcher, Empidonax virescens (A)
- Alder flycatcher, Empidonax alnorum (B)
- Willow flycatcher, Empidonax traillii (B)
- Least flycatcher, Empidonax minimus (B)
- Hammond's flycatcher, Empidonax hammondii (A)
- Western flycatcher, Empidonax difficilis (A)
- Eastern phoebe, Sayornis phoebe (B)
- Say's phoebe, Sayornis saya (R)

== Vireos, shrike-babblers, and erpornis ==
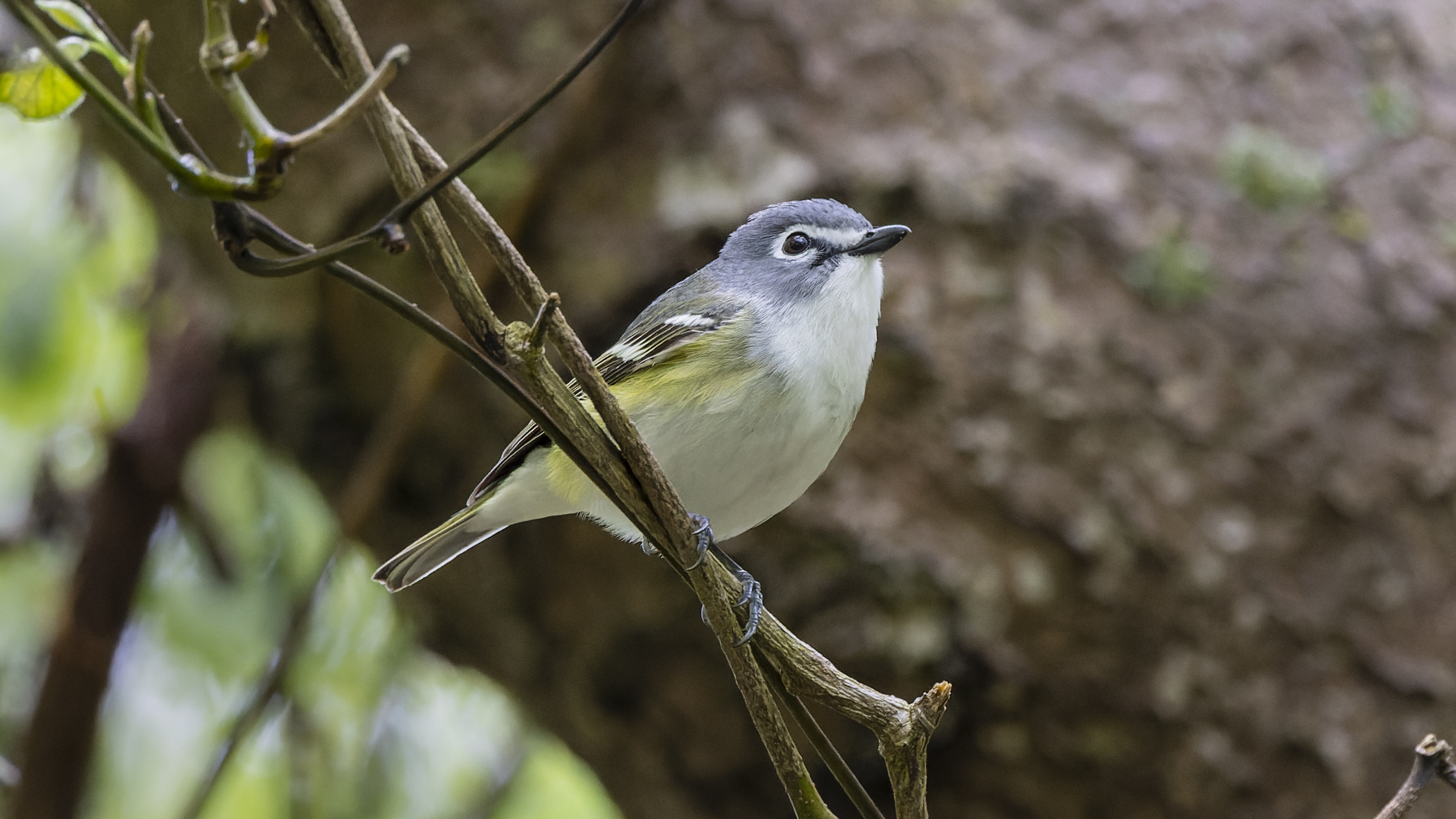
Blue-headed vireo

Order: Passeriformes Family: Vireonidae

The vireos are a group of small to medium-sized passerine birds mostly restricted to the New World, though a few other members of the family are found in Asia. They are typically greenish in colour and resemble wood warblers apart from their heavier bills.

- White-eyed vireo (viréo aux yeux blancs), Vireo griseus
- Yellow-throated vireo (viréo à gorge jaune), Vireo flavifrons (R)
- Blue-headed vireo (viréo à tête bleue), Vireo solitarius (B)
- Philadelphia vireo (viréo de Philadelphie), Vireo philadelphicus (B)
- Warbling vireo (viréo mélodieux), Vireo gilvus (B)
- Red-eyed vireo (viréo aux yeux rouges), Vireo olivaceus (B)
- Bell's vireo (viréo de Bell), Vireo bellii (A)

== Shrikes ==
Order: Passeriformes Family: Laniidae

Shrikes are passerine birds known for their habit of catching other birds and small animals and impaling the uneaten portions of their bodies on thorns. A shrike's beak is hooked, like that of a typical bird of prey.

- Loggerhead shrike (pie-grièche migratrice), Lanius ludovicianus (R)
- Northern shrike (pie-grièche boréale), Lanius borealis

== Crows, jays, and magpies ==
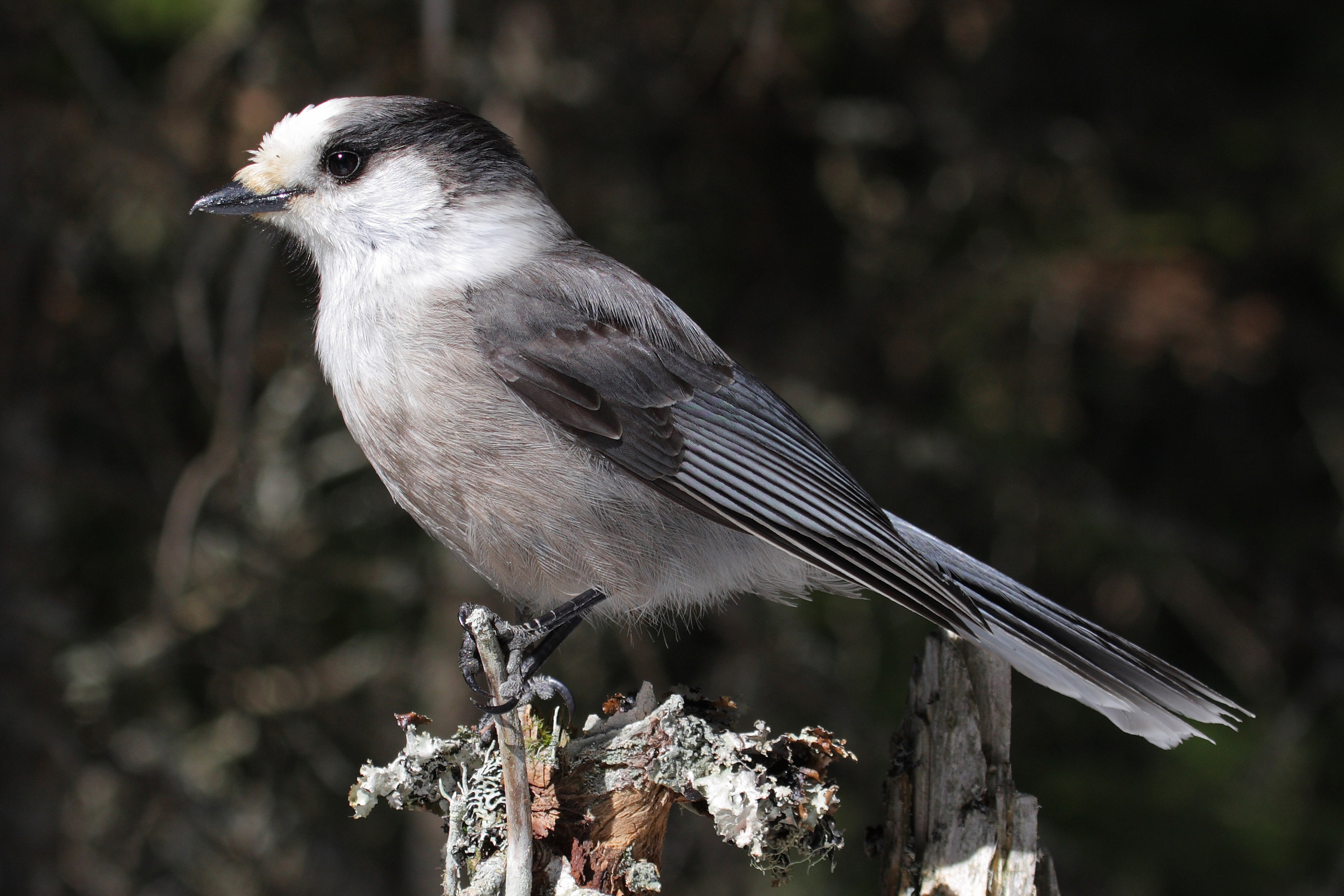
Canada jay

Order: Passeriformes Family: Corvidae

The family Corvidae includes crows, ravens, jays, choughs, magpies, treepies, nutcrackers, and ground jays. Corvids are above average in size among the Passeriformes, and some of the larger species show high levels of intelligence.

- Canada jay (mésangeai du Canada), Perisoreus canadensis (B)
- Blue jay (geai bleu), Cyanocitta cristata (B)
- Black-billed magpie (pie d'Amérique), Pica hudsonia (A)
- American crow (corneille d'Amérique), Corvus brachyrhynchos (B)
- Common raven (grand corbeau), Corvus corax (B)

== Tits, chickadees, and titmice ==
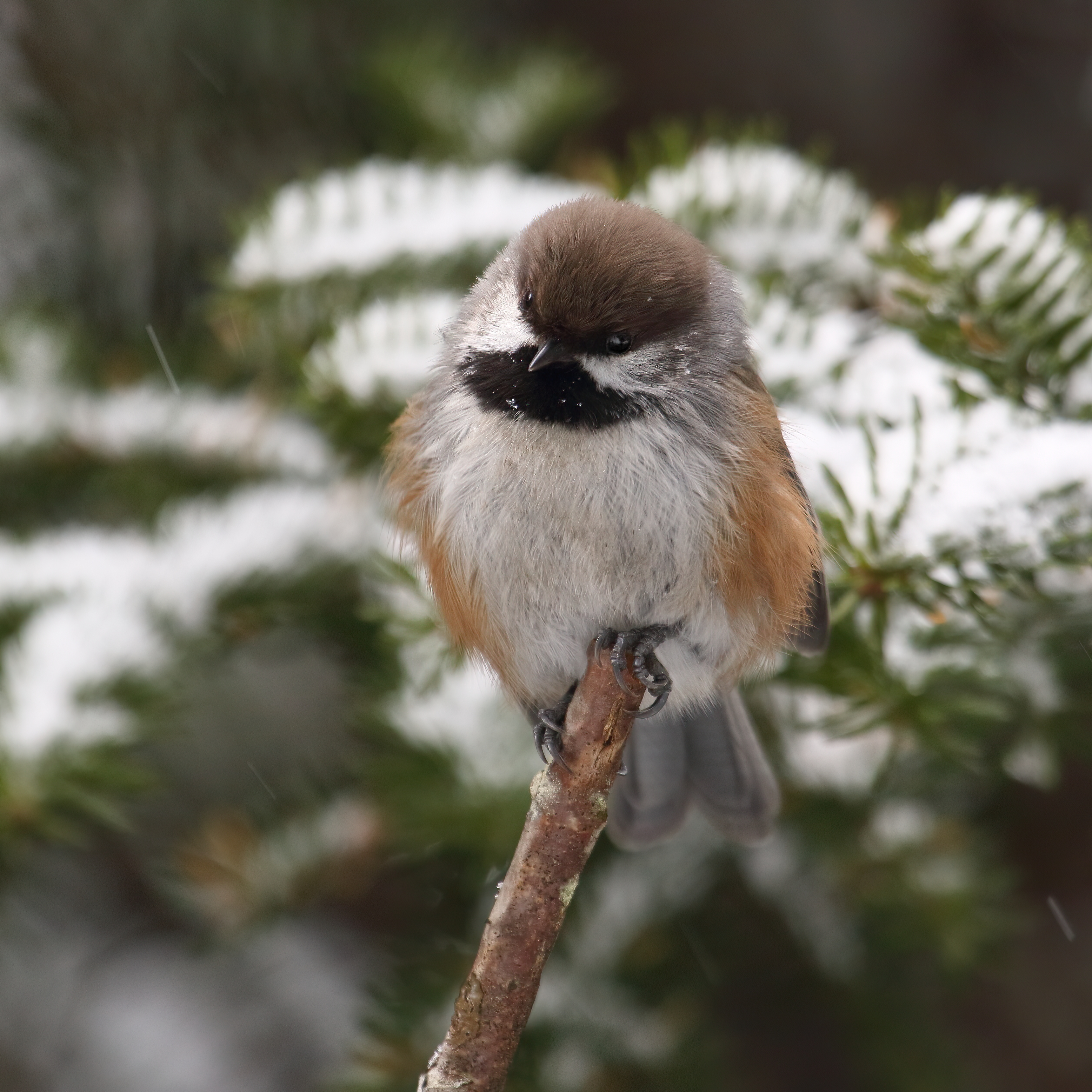
Boreal chickadee

Order: Passeriformes Family: Paridae

Paridae are mainly small stocky woodland species with short stout bills. Some have crests. They are adaptable birds, with a mixed diet including seeds and insects.

- Black-capped chickadee (mésange à tête noire), Poecile atricapilla (B)
- Boreal chickadee (mésange à tête brune), Poecile hudsonica (B)
- Tufted titmouse (mésange bicolore), Baeolophus bicolor

== Larks ==
Order: Passeriformes Family: Alaudidae

Larks are small terrestrial birds with often extravagant songs and display flights. Most larks are fairly dull in appearance. Their food is insects and seeds.

- Horned lark (alouette hausse-col), Eremophila alpestris (B)

== Swallows ==
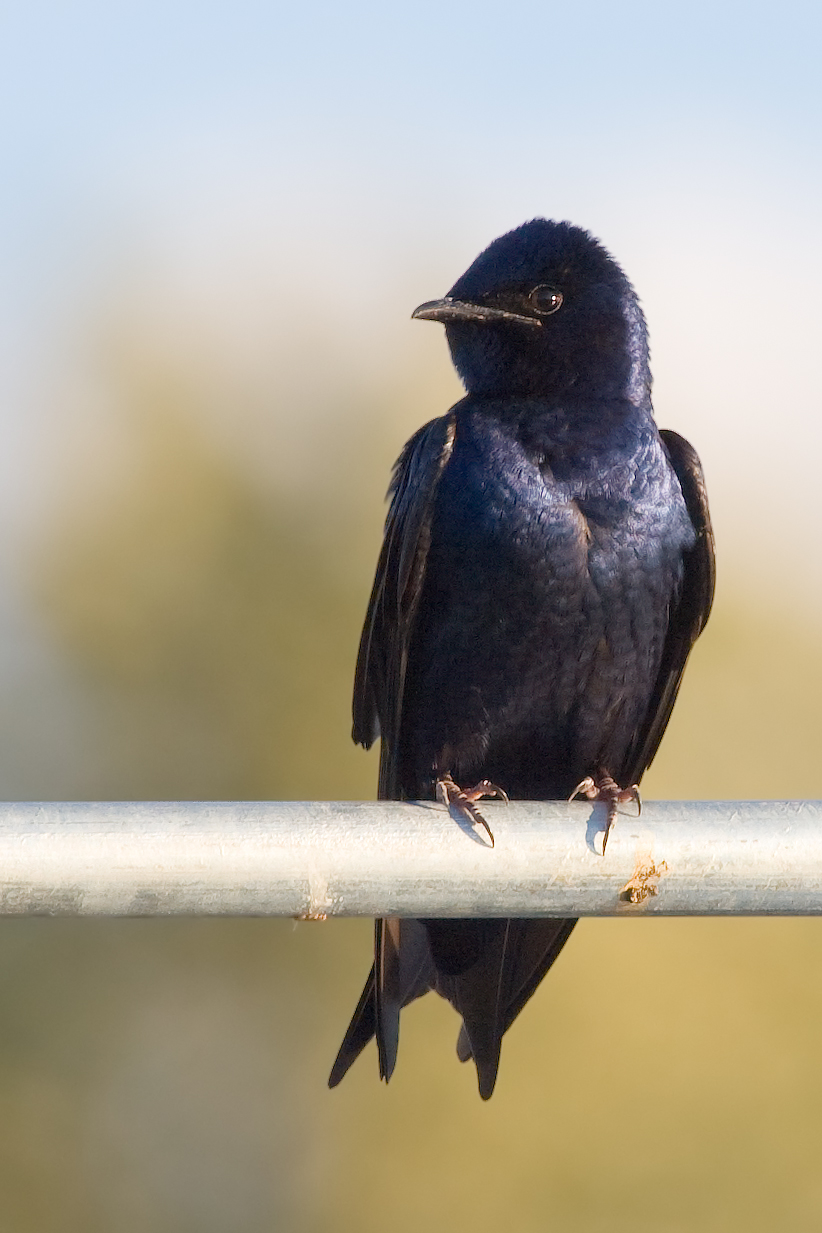
Purple martin

Order: Passeriformes Family: Hirundinidae

The family Hirundinidae is adapted to aerial feeding. They have a slender streamlined body, long pointed wings, and a short bill with a wide gape. The feet are adapted to perching rather than walking, and the front toes are partially joined at the base.

- Bank swallow (hirondelle de rivage), Riparia riparia (B)
- Tree swallow (hirondelle bicolore), Tachycineta bicolor (B)
- Northern rough-winged swallow (hirondelle à ailes hérissées), Stelgidopteryx serripennis (B)
- Purple martin (hirondelle noire), Progne subis (B)
- Barn swallow (hirondelle rustique), Hirundo rustica (B)
- Cliff swallow (hirondelle à front blanc), Petrochelidon pyrrhonota (B)
- Cave swallow (hirondelle à front brun), Petrochelidon fulva (A)

== Kinglets ==
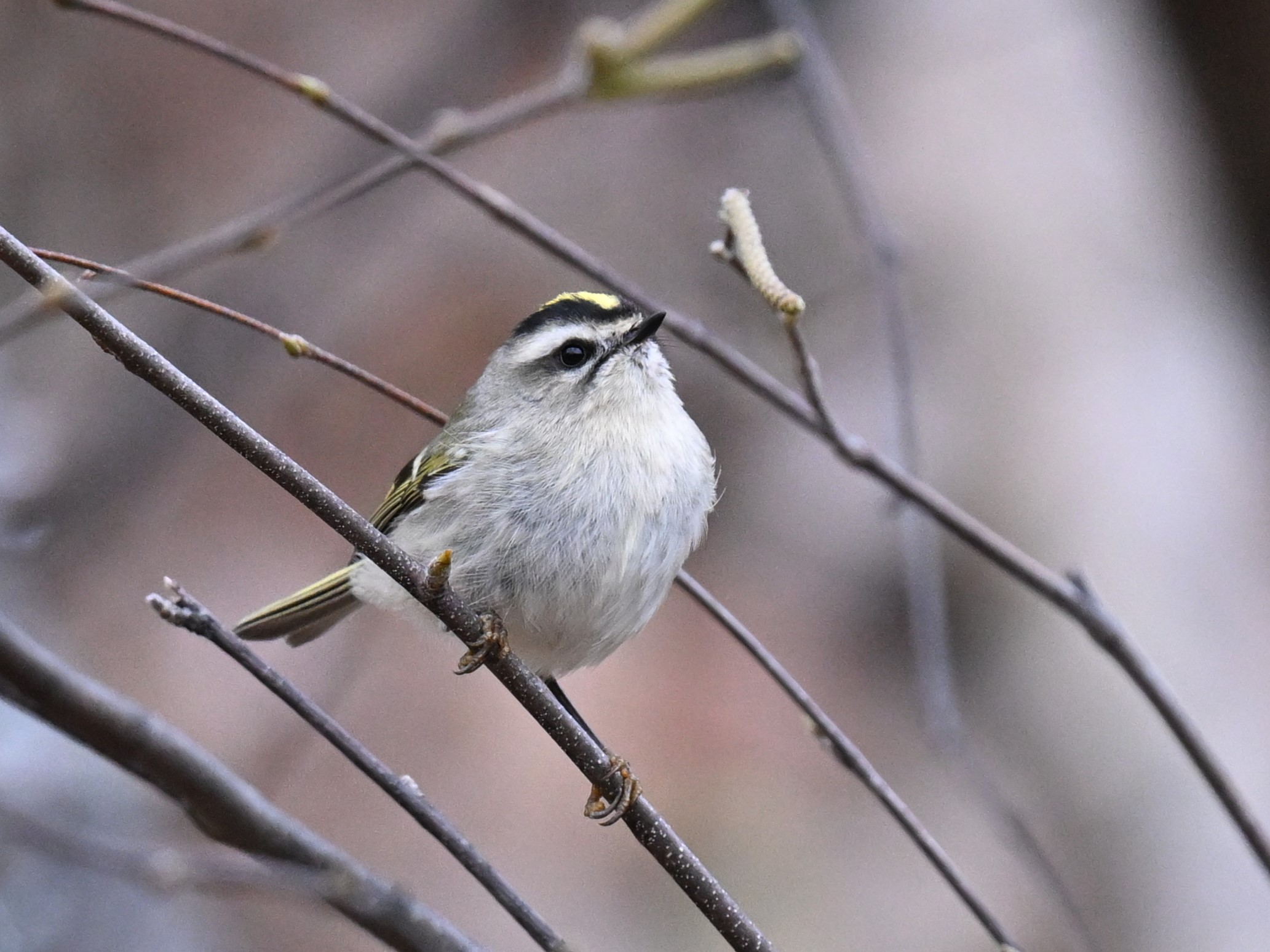
Golden-crowned kinglet

Order: Passeriformes Family: Regulidae

Kinglets are a small family of birds which resemble the titmice. They are very small insectivorous birds. The adults have coloured crowns, giving rise to their name. They are found in many different types of forests, with a preference for coniferous forests.

- Ruby-crowned kinglet (roitelet à couronne rubis), Corthylio calendula (B)
- Golden-crowned kinglet (roitelet à couronne dorée), Regulus satrapa (B)

== Waxwings ==
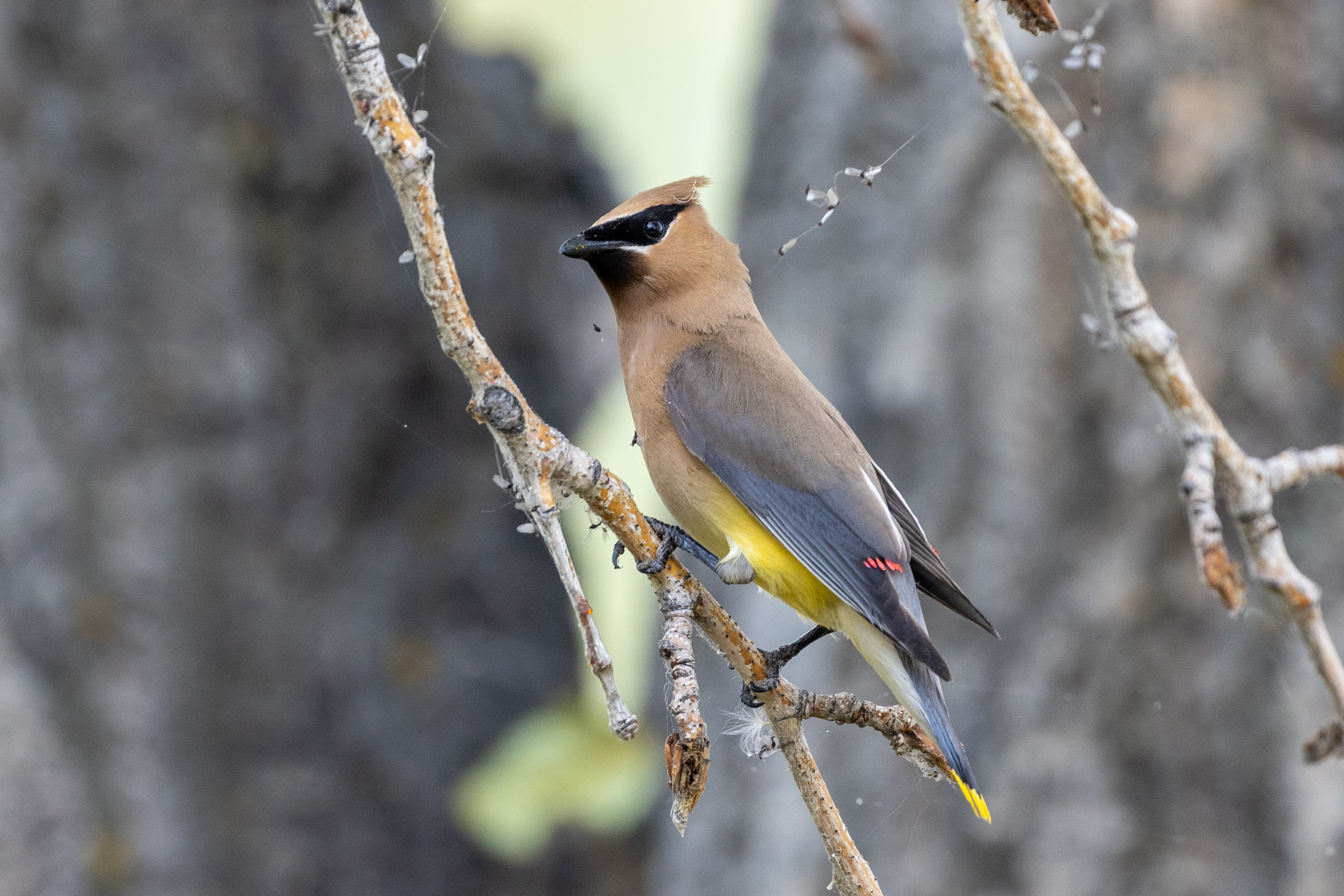
Cedar waxwing

Order: Passeriformes Family: Bombycillidae

Waxwings are a group of passerine birds with soft silky plumage and unique red tips to some of the wing feathers. In the Bohemian and cedar waxwings, these tips look like sealing wax and give the group its name. These are arboreal birds of northern forests. They live on insects in summer and berries in winter.

- Bohemian waxwing (jaseur boréal), Bombycilla garrulus
- Cedar waxwing (jaseur d'Amérique), Bombycilla cedrorum (B)

== Nuthatches ==
Order: Passeriformes Family: Sittidae

Nuthatches are small woodland birds. They have the unusual ability to climb down trees head first, unlike other birds which can only go upwards. Nuthatches have big heads, short tails and powerful bills and feet.

- Red-breasted nuthatch (sittelle à poitrine rousse), Sitta canadensis (B)
- White-breasted nuthatch (sittelle à poitrine blanche), Sitta carolinensis (B)

== Treecreepers ==
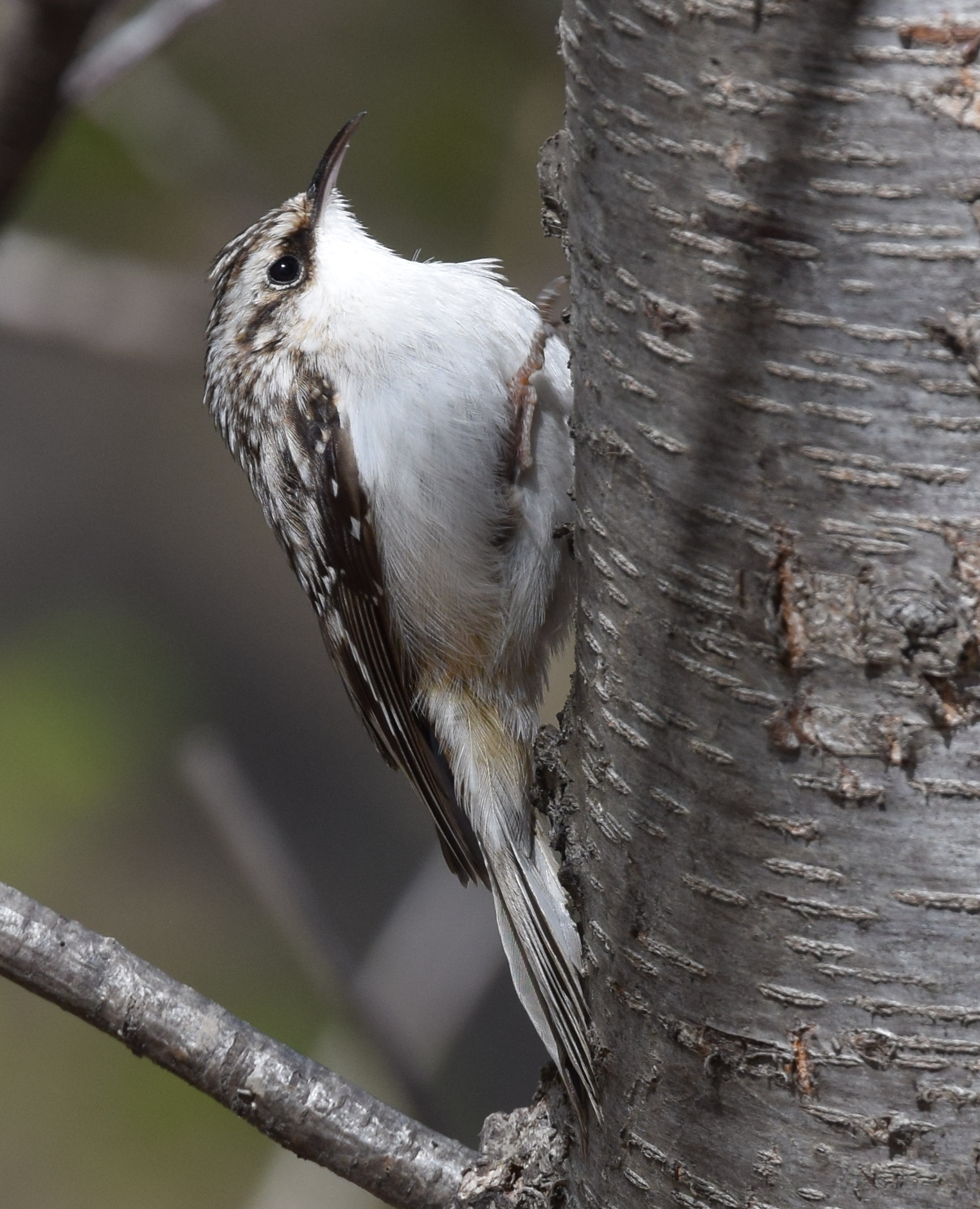
Brown creeper

Order: Passeriformes Family: Certhiidae

Treecreepers are small woodland birds, brown above and white below. They have thin pointed down-curved bills, which they use to extricate insects from bark. They have stiff tail feathers, like woodpeckers, which they use to support themselves on vertical trees.

- Brown creeper (grimpereau brun), Certhia americana (B)

== Gnatcatchers ==
Order: Passeriformes Family: Polioptilidae

These dainty birds resemble Old World warblers in their structure and habits, moving restlessly through the foliage seeking insects. Gnatcatchers are mainly soft bluish grey in colour and have the typical insectivore's long sharp bill. Many species have distinctive black head patterns (especially males) and long, regularly cocked, black-and-white tails.

- Blue-grey gnatcatcher (gobemoucheron gris-bleu), Polioptila caerulea

== Wrens ==
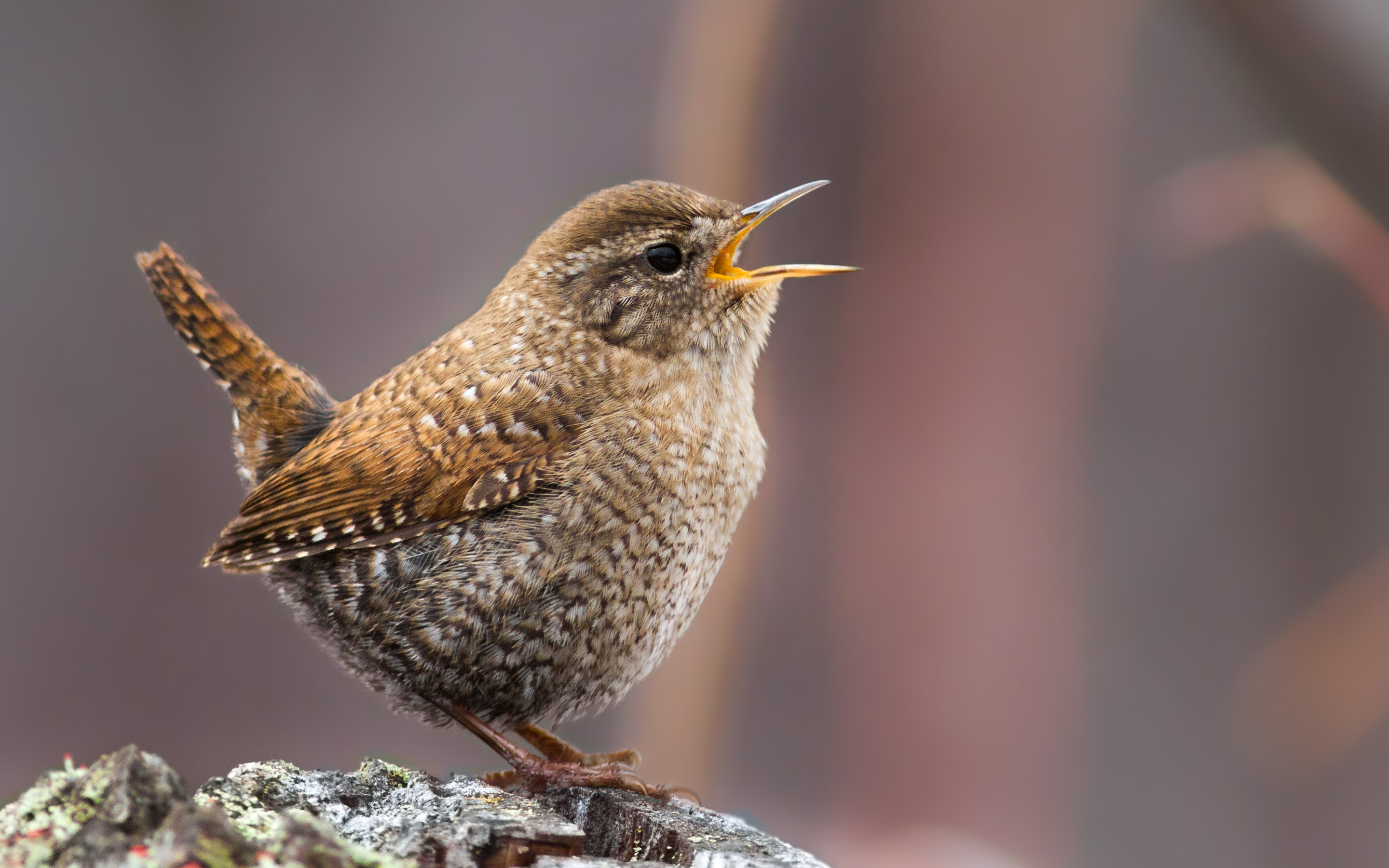
Winter wren

Order: Passeriformes Family: Troglodytidae

Wrens are small and inconspicuous birds, except for their loud songs. They have short wings and thin down-turned bills. Several species often hold their tails upright. All are insectivorous.

- House wren (troglodyte familier), Troglodytes aedon
- Winter wren (troglodyte des forêts), Troglodytes hiemalis (B)
- Sedge wren (troglodyte à bec court), Cistothorus platensis (R)
- Marsh wren (troglodyte des marais), Cistothorus palustris (B)
- Carolina wren (troglodyte de Caroline), Thryothorus ludovicianus
- Bewick's wren (troglodyte de Bewick), Thryomanes bewickii (A)

== Mockingbirds and thrashers ==
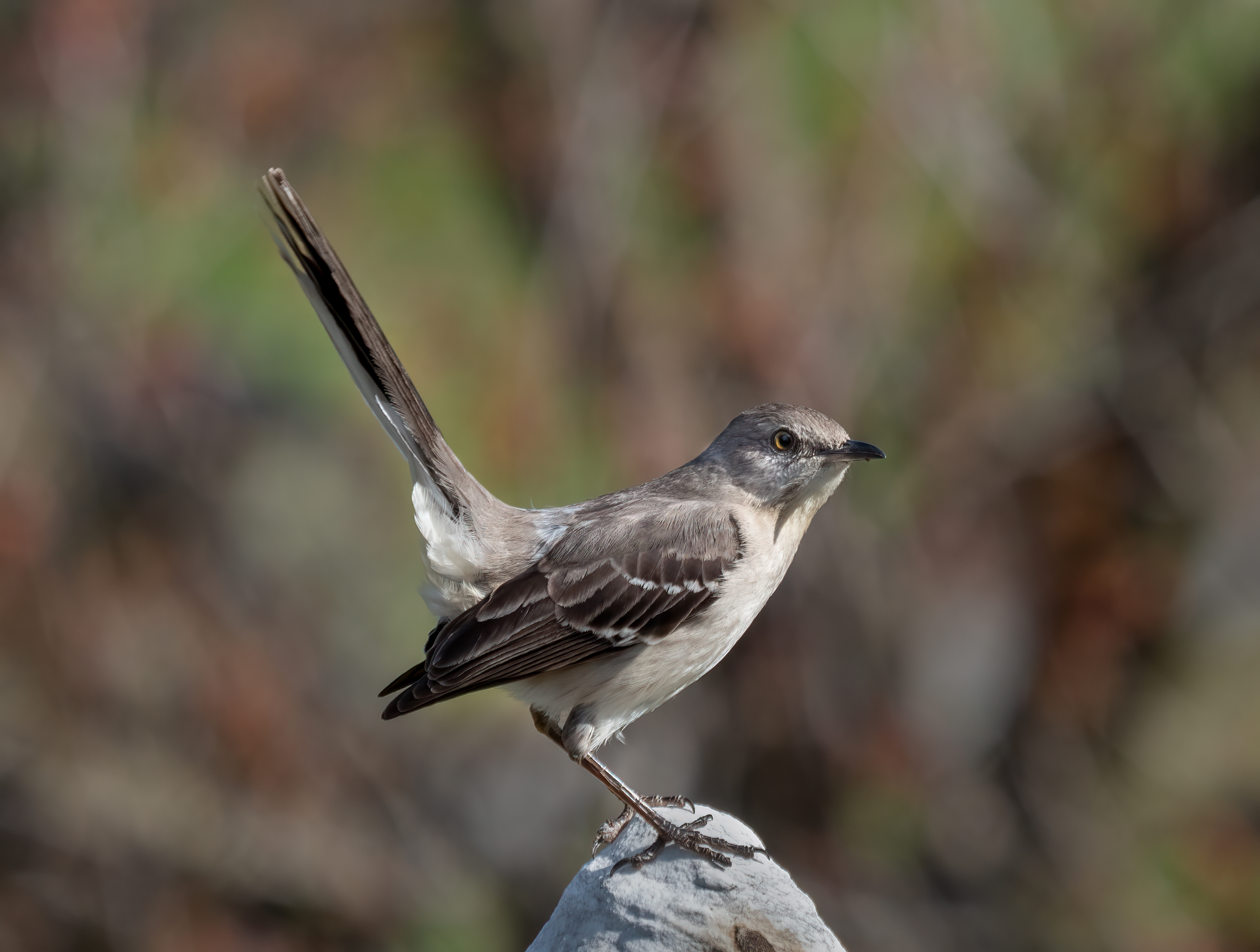
Northern mockingbird

Order: Passeriformes Family: Mimidae

The mimids are a family of passerine birds which includes thrashers, mockingbirds, tremblers, and the New World catbirds. These birds are notable for their vocalization, especially their remarkable ability to mimic a wide variety of birds and other sounds heard outdoors. The species tend towards dull greys and browns in their appearance.

- Grey catbird (moqueur chat), Dumetella carolinensis (B)
- Brown thrasher (moqueur roux), Toxostoma rufum (B)
- Sage thrasher (moqueur des armoises), Oreoscoptes montanus (A)
- Northern mockingbird (moqueur polyglotte), Mimus polyglottos (B)

== Starlings ==
Order: Passeriformes Family: Sturnidae

Starlings and mynas are small to medium-sized Old World passerine birds with strong feet. Their flight is strong and direct and most are very gregarious. Their preferred habitat is fairly open country, and they eat insects and fruit. The plumage of several species is dark with a metallic sheen.

- European starling (étourneau sansonnet), Sturnus vulgaris (B) (I)

== Thrushes and allies ==
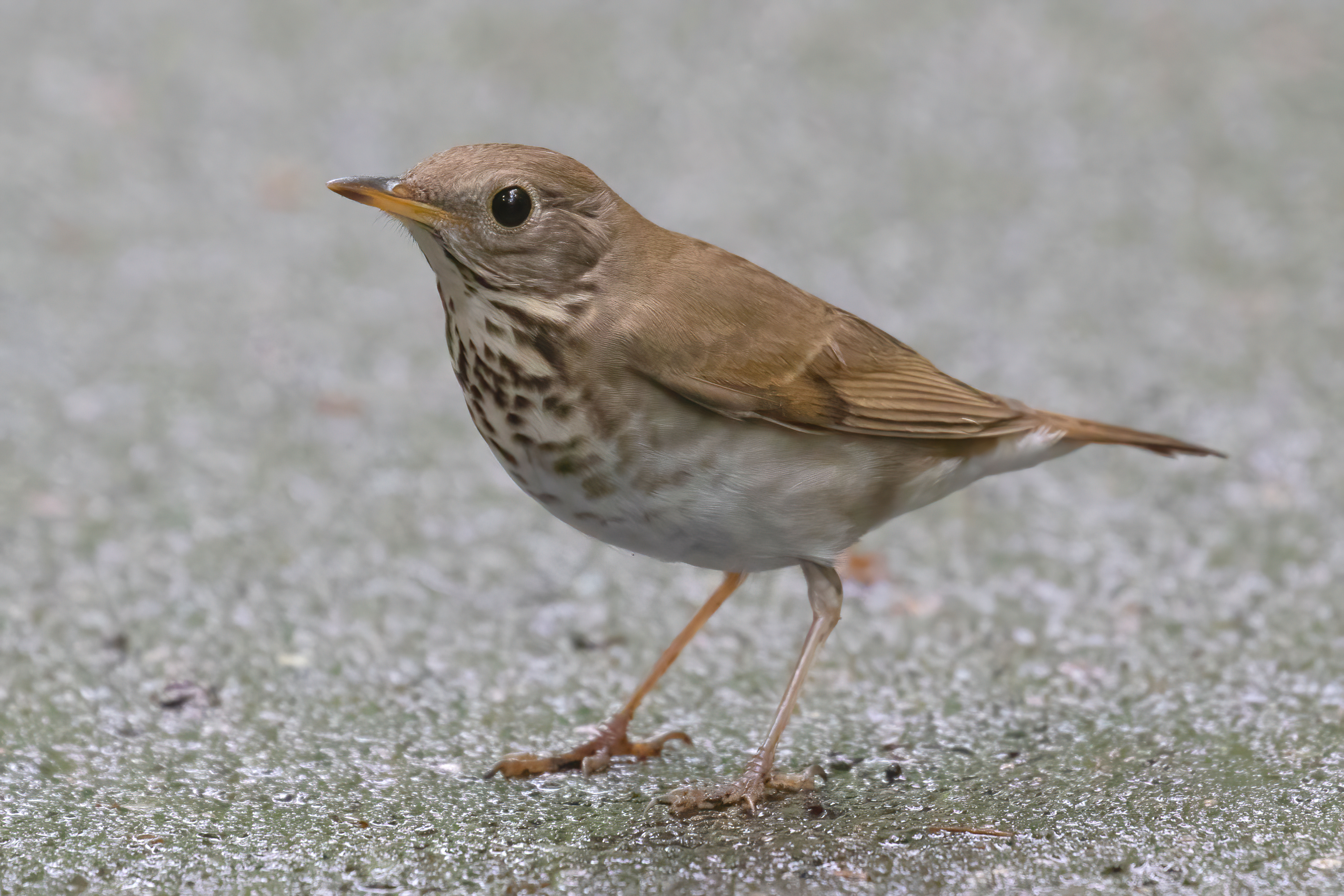
Bicknell's thrush

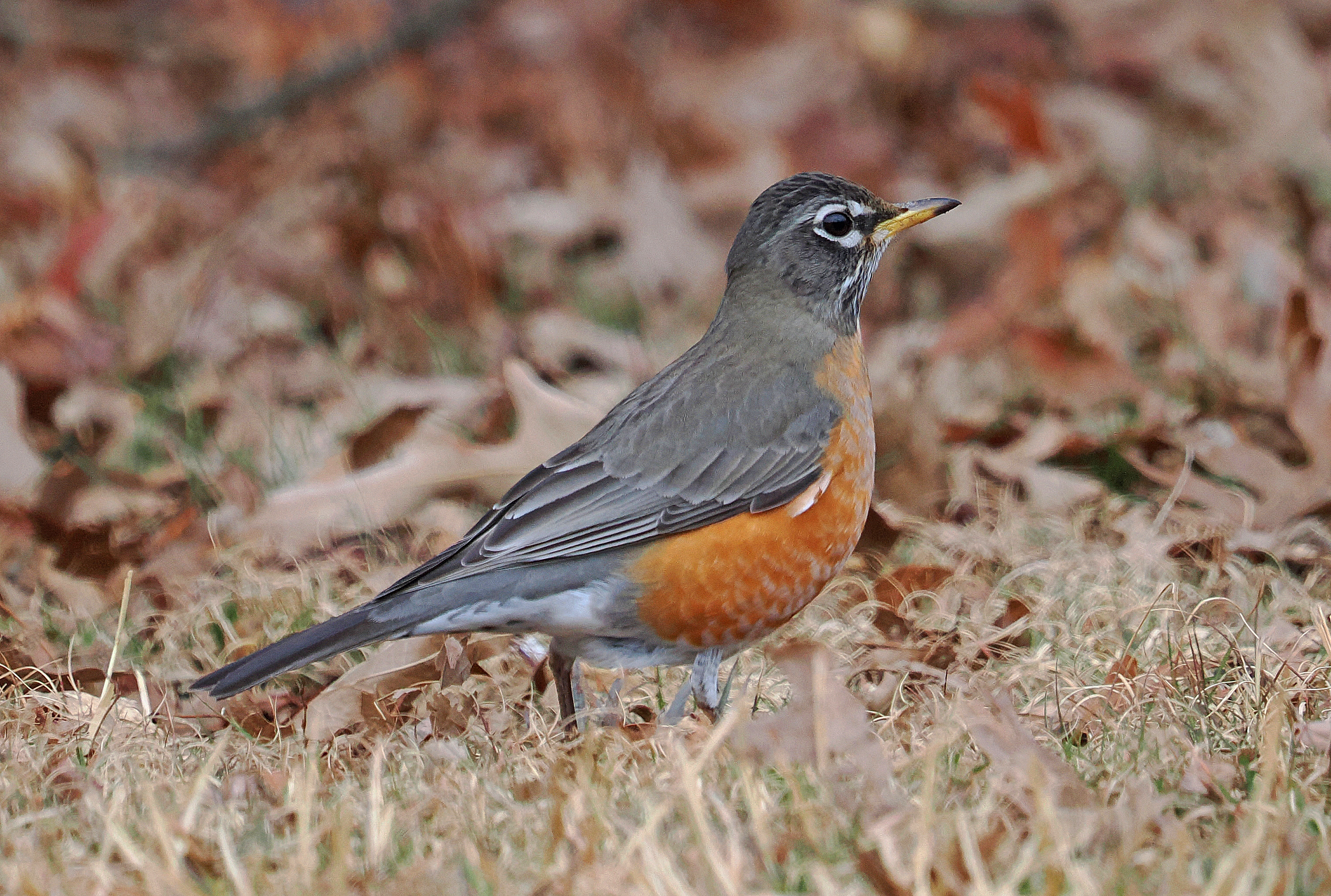
American robin

Order: Passeriformes Family: Turdidae

The thrushes are a group of passerine birds that occur mainly but not exclusively in the Old World. They are plump, soft plumaged, small to medium-sized insectivores or sometimes omnivores, often feeding on the ground. Many have attractive songs.

- Eastern bluebird, Sialia sialis (B)
- Mountain bluebird, Sialia currucoides (A)
- Townsend's solitaire, Myadestes townsendi (R)
- Veery, Catharus fuscescens (B)
- Grey-cheeked thrush, Catharus minimus
- Bicknell's thrush, Catharus bicknelli (B)
- Swainson's thrush, Catharus ustulatus (B)
- Hermit thrush, Catharus guttatus (B)
- Wood thrush, Hylocichla mustelina (B)
- Fieldfare, Turdus pilaris (A)
- Mistle thrush, Turdus viscivorus (A)
- Redwing, Turdus iliacus (A)
- American robin, Turdus migratorius (B)
- Varied thrush, Ixoreus naevius (R)

== Old World flycatchers ==
Order: Passeriformes Family: Muscicapidae

The Old World flycatchers are a large family of small passerine birds. These are mainly small arboreal insectivores, many of which, as the name implies, take their prey on the wing.

- Northern wheatear (traquet motteux), Oenanthe oenanthe (R)
- Siberian stonechat (tarier de Sibérie), Saxicola maurus (A)

== Old World sparrows ==
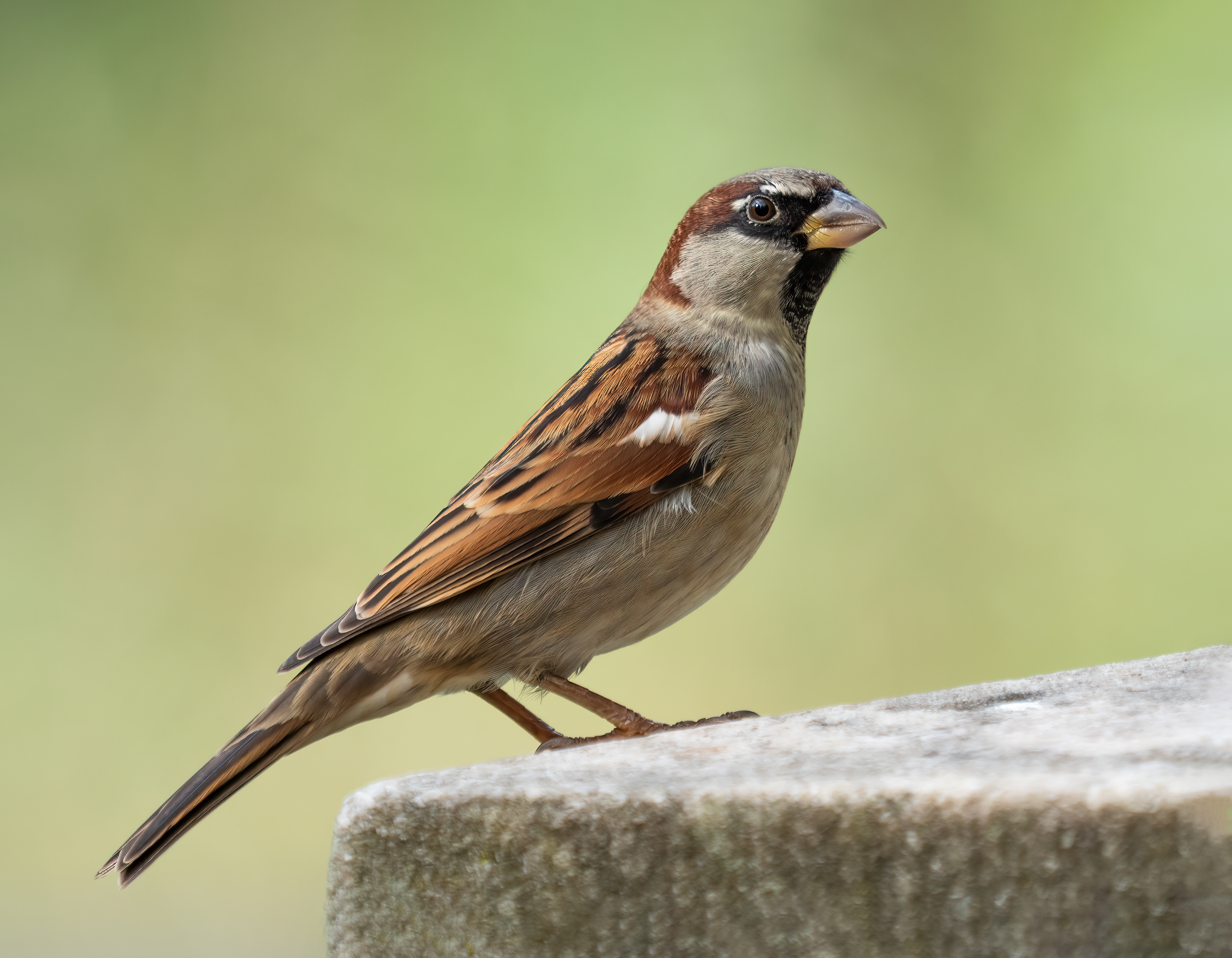
House sparrow

Order: Passeriformes Family: Passeridae

Old World sparrows are small passerine birds. In general, sparrows tend to be small plump brownish or greyish birds with short tails and short powerful beaks. Sparrows are seed eaters, but they also consume small insects.

- House sparrow (moineau domestique), Passer domesticus (B) (I)
- Eurasian tree sparrow (moineau friquet), Passer montanus (A) (I)

== Wagtails and pipits ==
Order: Passeriformes Family: Motacillidae

Motacillidae is a family of small passerine birds with medium to long tails. They include the wagtails, longclaws and pipits. They are slender ground-feeding insectivores of open country.

- American pipit (pipit d'Amérique), Anthus rubescens

== Finches, euphonias, and allies ==
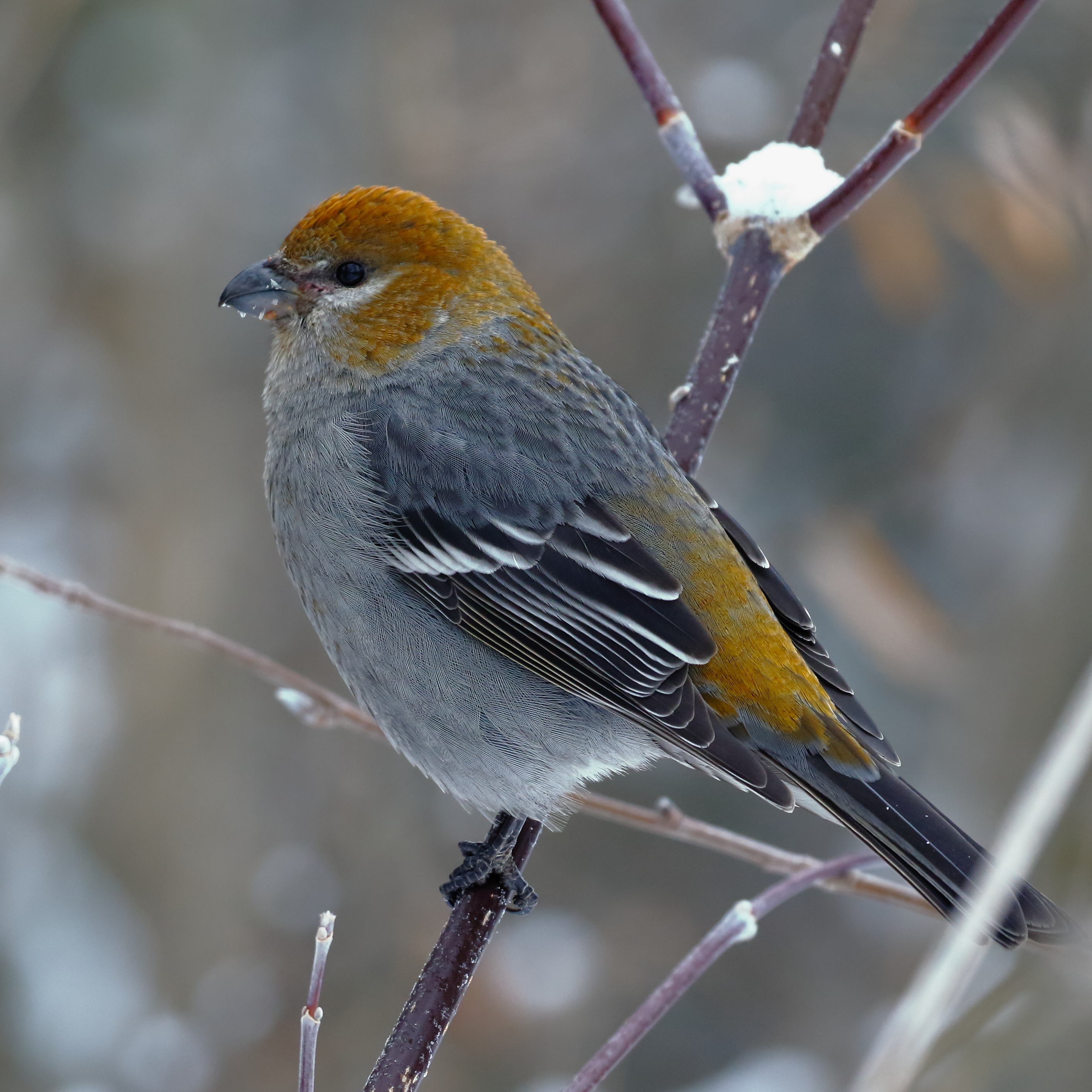
Pine grosbeak

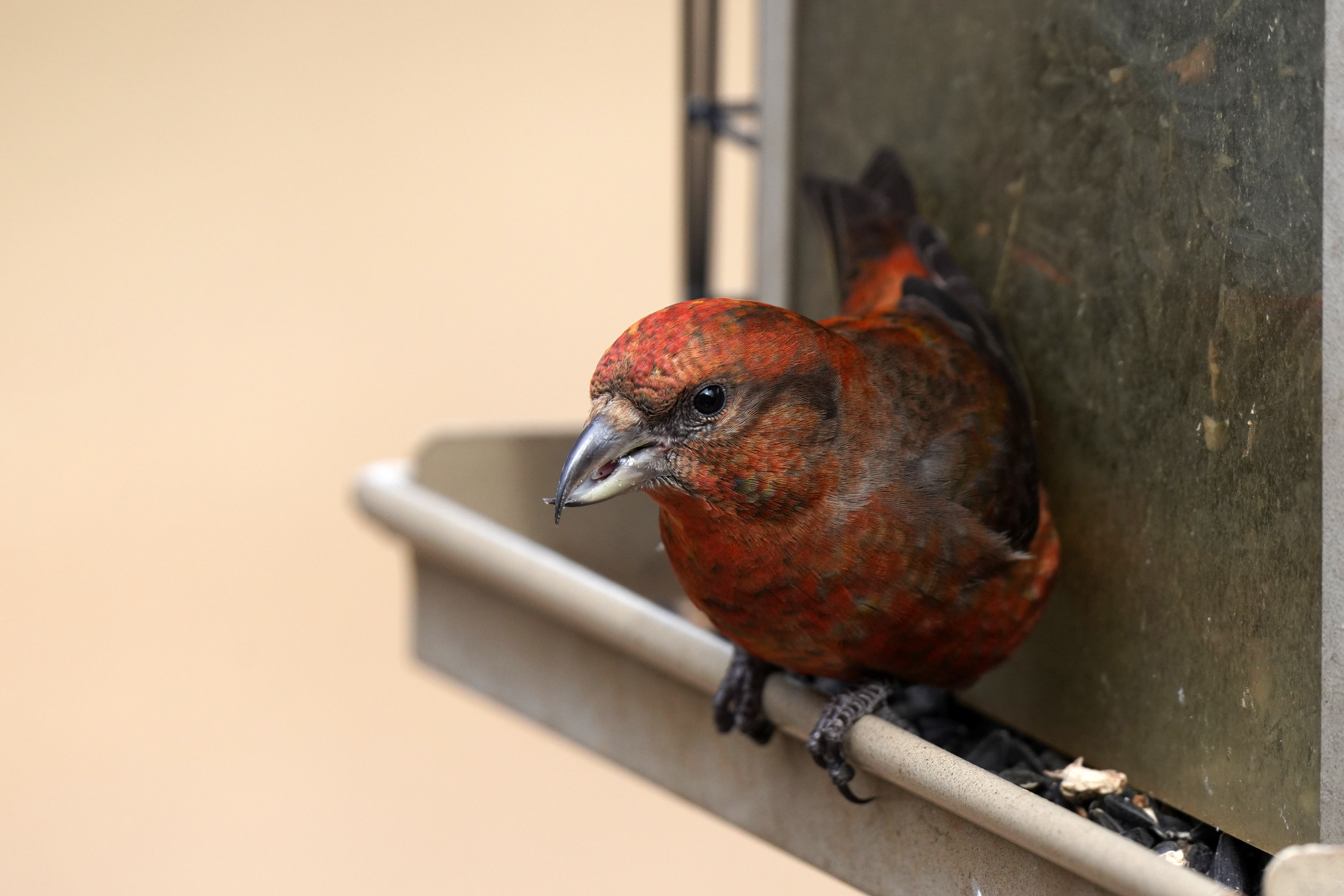
Red crossbill

Order: Passeriformes Family: Fringillidae

Finches are seed-eating passerine birds, that are small to moderately large and have a strong beak, usually conical and in some species very large. All have twelve tail feathers and nine primaries. These birds have a bouncing flight with alternating bouts of flapping and gliding on closed wings, and most sing well.

- Common chaffinch, Fringilla coelebs (A)
- Evening grosbeak, Coccothraustes vespertinus (B)
- Pine grosbeak, Pinicola enucleator (B)
- House finch, Haemorhous mexicanus (B) (Native to the southwestern U.S.; introduced in the east)
- Purple finch, Haemorhous purpureus (B)
- Common redpoll, Acanthis flammea
- Hoary redpoll, Acanthis hornemanni (R)
- Red crossbill, Loxia curvirostra (B)
- White-winged crossbill, Loxia leucoptera (B)
- Pine siskin, Spinus pinus (B)
- American goldfinch, Spinus tristis (B)

== Longspurs and snow buntings ==
Order: Passeriformes Family: Calcariidae

Calcariidae are a group of passerine birds that are mostly endemic to North America. They are primarily found in open fields, where their plumage helps them blend into their surroundings.

- Lapland longspur (bruant lapon), Calcarius lapponicus
- Chestnut-collared longspur (plectrophane à ventre noir), Calcarius ornatus (A)
- Snow bunting (bruant des neiges), Plectrophenax nivalis

== New World sparrows ==
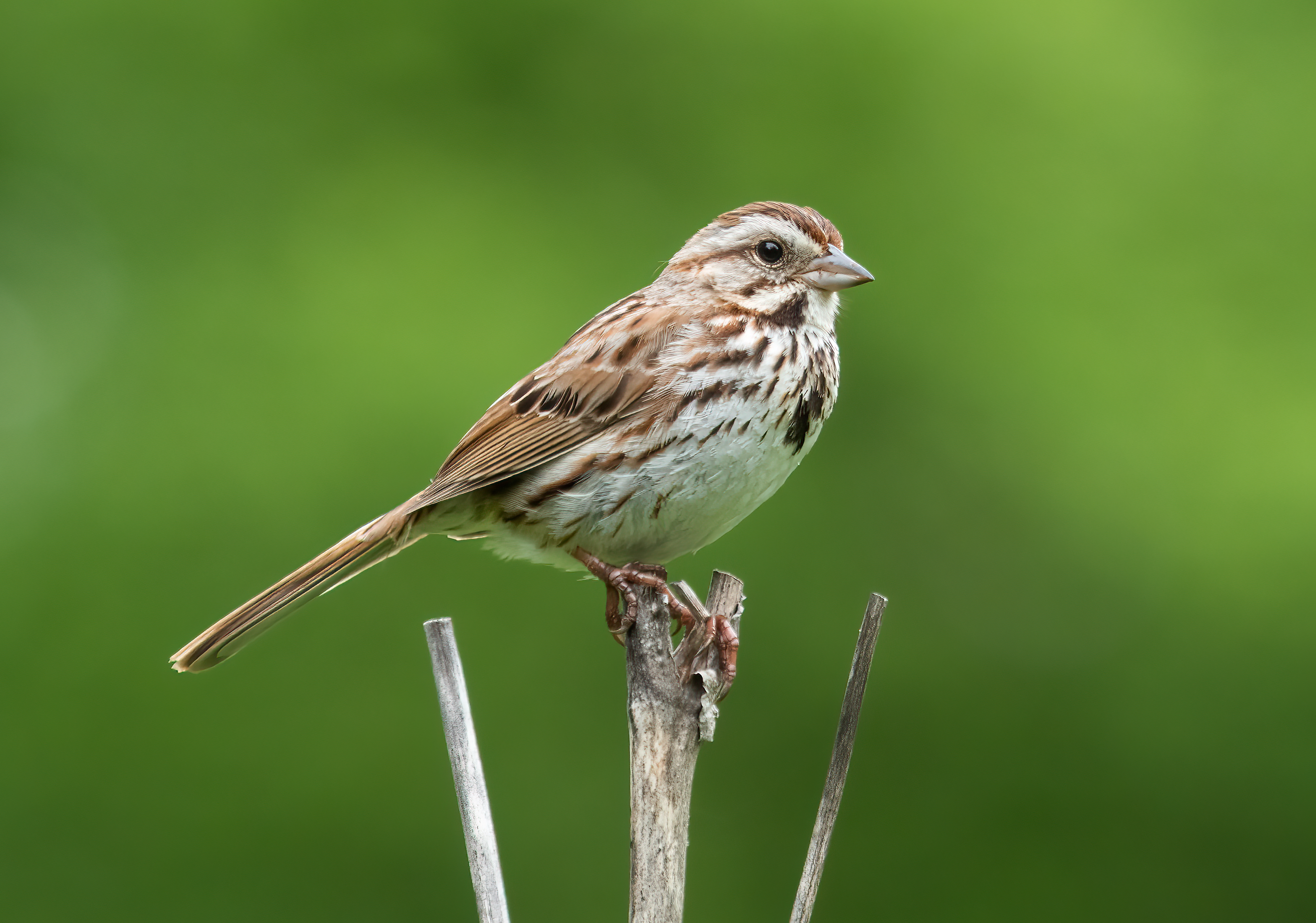
Song sparrow

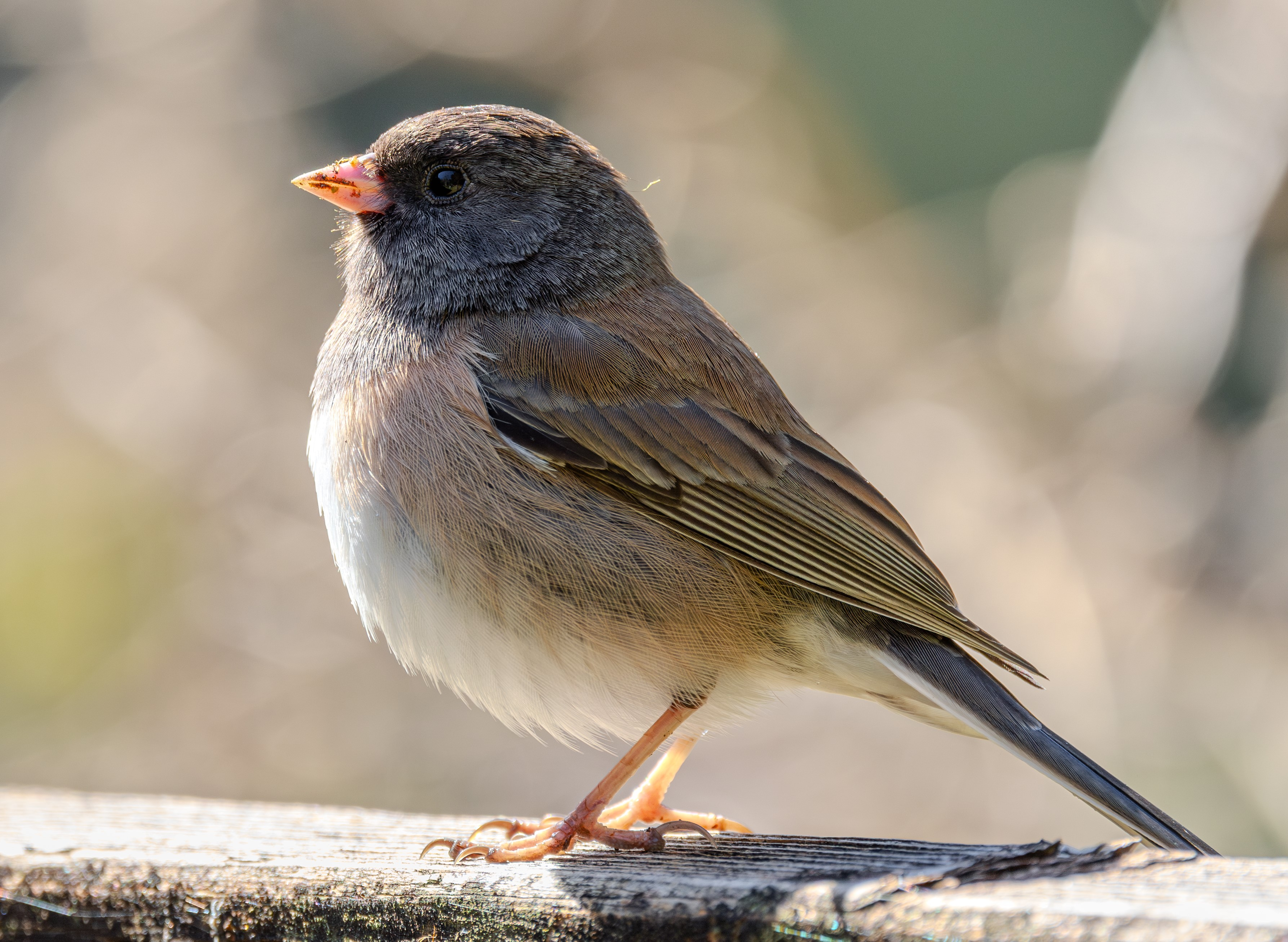
Dark-eyed junco

Order: Passeriformes Family: Passerellidae

Until 2017, these species were considered part of the family Emberizidae. Most of the species are known as sparrows, but these birds are not closely related to the Old World sparrows which are in the family Passeridae. Many of these have distinctive head patterns.

- Grasshopper sparrow, Ammodramus savannarum (R)
- Lark sparrow, Chondestes grammacus
- Lark bunting, Calamospiza melanocorys (R)
- Brewer's sparrow, Spizella breweri (A)
- Chipping sparrow, Spizella passerina (B)
- Clay-colored sparrow, Spizella pallida
- Field sparrow, Spizella pusilla
- Black-throated sparrow, Amphispiza bilineata (A)
- Fox sparrow, Passerella iliaca (B)
- American tree sparrow, Spizelloides arborea
- Dark-eyed junco, Junco hyemalis (B)
- White-crowned sparrow, Zonotrichia leucophrys
- Golden-crowned sparrow, Zonotrichia atricapilla (A)
- Harris's sparrow, Zonotrichia querula (R)
- White-throated sparrow, Zonotrichia albicollis (B)
- Vesper sparrow, Pooecetes gramineus (B)
- LeConte's sparrow, Ammospiza leconteii (A)
- Seaside sparrow, Ammospiza maritima (R)
- Nelson's sparrow, Ammospiza nelsoni (B)
- Savannah sparrow, Passerculus sandwichensis (B)
- Song sparrow, Melospiza melodia (B)
- Lincoln's sparrow, Melospiza lincolnii (B)
- Swamp sparrow, Melospiza georgiana (B)
- Green-tailed towhee, Pipilo chlorurus (A)
- Spotted towhee, Pipilo maculatus (A)
- Eastern towhee, Pipilo erythrophthalmus

== Yellow-breasted chat ==
Order: Passeriformes Family: Icteriidae

The yellow-breasted chat is the sole member of the family Icteriidae and is a bright, colourful songbird found in open shrubs throughout North and Central America. This species was historically placed in the wood-warblers (Parulidae) but nonetheless most authorities were unsure if it belonged there. It was placed in its own family in 2017.

- Yellow-breasted chat (ictérie polyglotte), Icteria virens

== Troupials and allies ==
Red-winged blackbird

Order: Passeriformes Family: Icteridae

Icterids are a group of small to medium-sized, often colourful passerine birds restricted to the New World and include the grackles, New World blackbirds, and New World orioles. Most species have black as a predominant plumage colour, often enlivened by yellow, orange, or red.

- Yellow-headed blackbird, Xanthocephalus xanthocephalus
- Bobolink, Dolichonyx oryzivorus (B)
- Eastern meadowlark, Sturnella magna (B)
- Western meadowlark, Sturnella neglecta (R)
- Orchard oriole, Icterus spurius
- Bullock's oriole, Icterus bullockii (A)
- Baltimore oriole, Icterus galbula (B)
- Red-winged blackbird, Agelaius phoeniceus (B)
- Shiny cowbird, Molothrus bonariensis (A)
- Brown-headed cowbird, Molothrus ater (B)
- Rusty blackbird, Euphagus carolinus (B)
- Brewer's blackbird, Euphagus cyanocephalus (A)
- Common grackle, Quiscalus quiscula (B)

== New World warblers ==
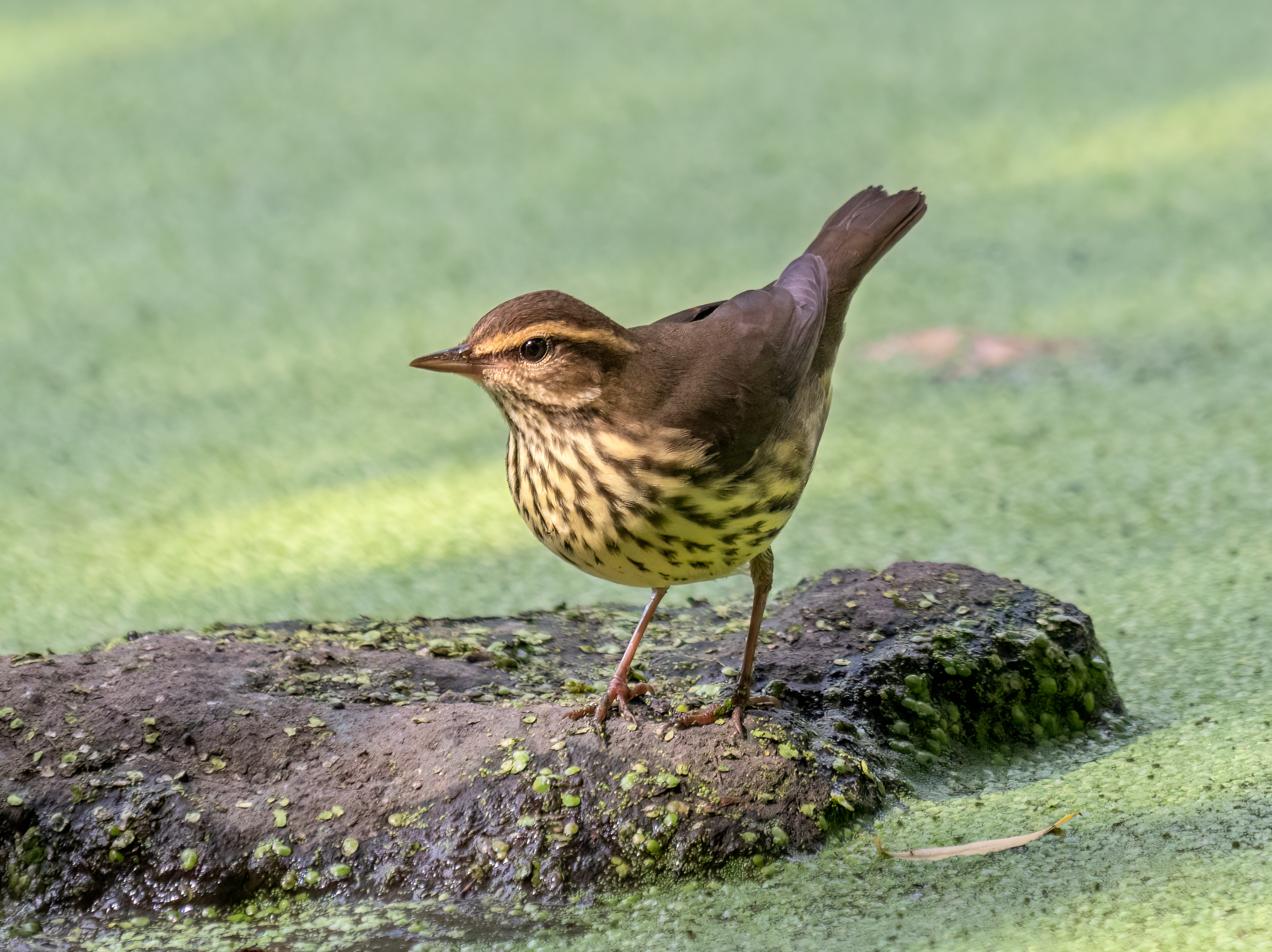
Northern waterthrush

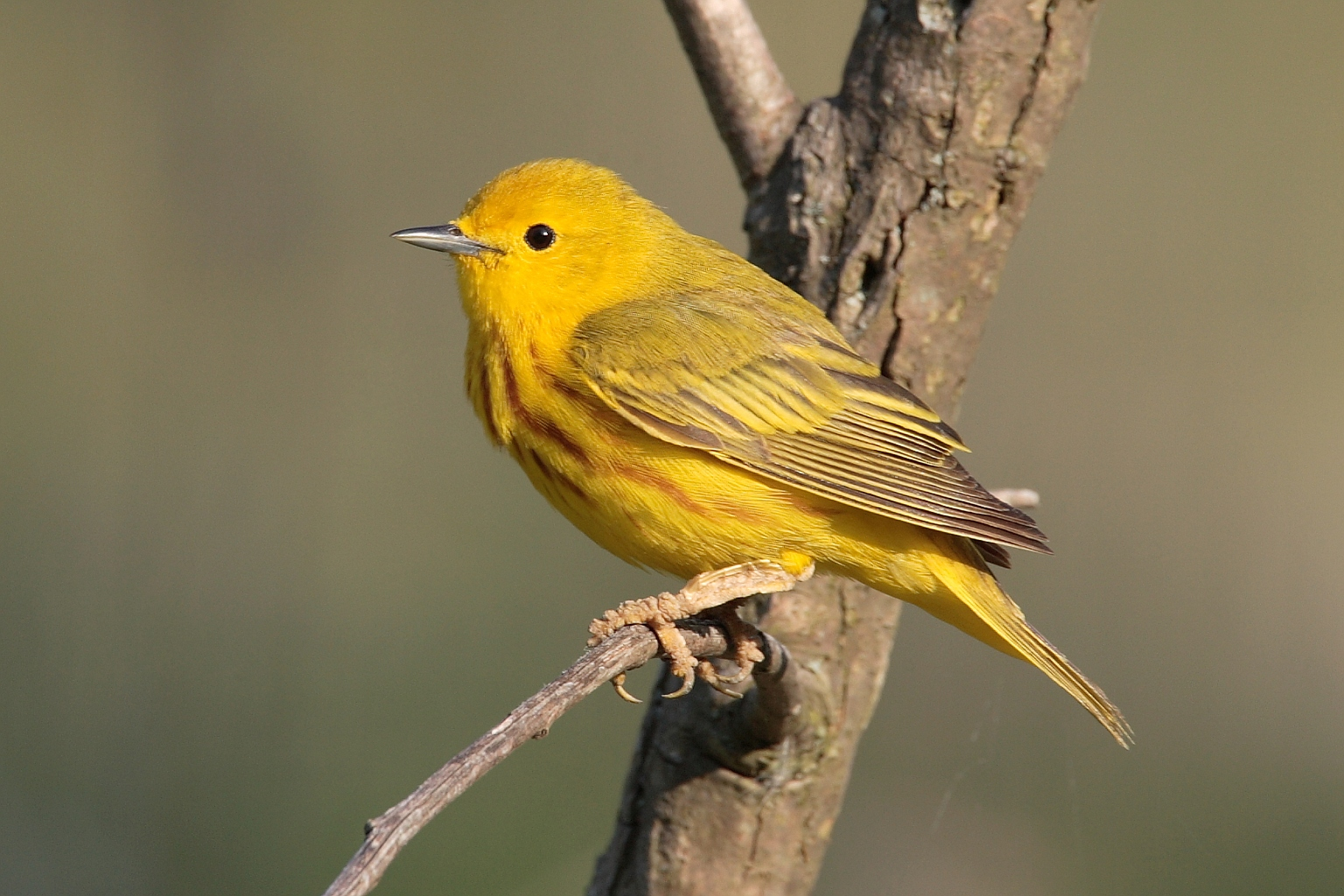
Yellow warbler

Order: Passeriformes Family: Parulidae

New World warblers are a group of small, often colourful, passerine birds restricted to the New World. Most are arboreal, but some are more terrestrial. Most members of this family are insectivores.

- Ovenbird, Seiurus aurocapilla (B)
- Worm-eating warbler, Helmitheros vermivorum (A)
- Louisiana waterthrush, Parkesia motacilla (A)
- Northern waterthrush, Parkesia noveboracensis (B)
- Golden-winged warbler, Vermivora chrysoptera (R)
- Blue-winged warbler, Vermivora cyanoptera
- Black-and-white warbler, Mniotilta varia (B)
- Prothonotary warbler, Protonotaria citrea (R)
- Tennessee warbler, Leiothlypis peregrina (B)
- Orange-crowned warbler, Leiothlypis celata
- Nashville warbler, Leiothlypis ruficapilla (B)
- Virginia's warbler, Leiothlypis virginiae (A)
- Connecticut warbler, Oporornis agilis (R)
- Mourning warbler, Geothlypis philadelphia (B)
- Kentucky warbler, Geothlypis formosa (A)
- MacGillivray's warbler, Geothlypis tolmiei (A)
- Common yellowthroat, Geothlypis trichas (B)
- Hooded warbler, Setophaga citrina (R)
- American redstart, Setophaga ruticilla (B)
- Cape May warbler, Setophaga tigrina (B)
- Cerulean warbler, Setophaga cerulea (R)
- Northern parula, Setophaga americana (B)
- Magnolia warbler, Setophaga magnolia (B)
- Bay-breasted warbler, Setophaga castanea (B)
- Blackburnian warbler, Setophaga fusca (B)
- Yellow warbler, Setophaga petechia (B)
- Chestnut-sided warbler, Setophaga pensylvanica (B)
- Blackpoll warbler, Setophaga striata (B)
- Black-throated blue warbler, Setophaga caerulescens (B)
- Palm warbler, Setophaga palmarum (B)
- Pine warbler, Setophaga pinus (B)
- Yellow-rumped warbler, Setophaga coronata (B)
- Yellow-throated warbler, Setophaga dominica (R)
- Prairie warbler, Setophaga discolor
- Black-throated grey warbler, Setophaga nigrescens (A)
- Townsend's warbler, Setophaga townsendi (A)
- Hermit warbler, Setophaga occidentalis (A)
- Black-throated green warbler, Setophaga virens (B)
- Canada warbler, Cardellina canadensis (B)
- Wilson's warbler, Cardellina pusilla (B)

== Cardinals and allies ==
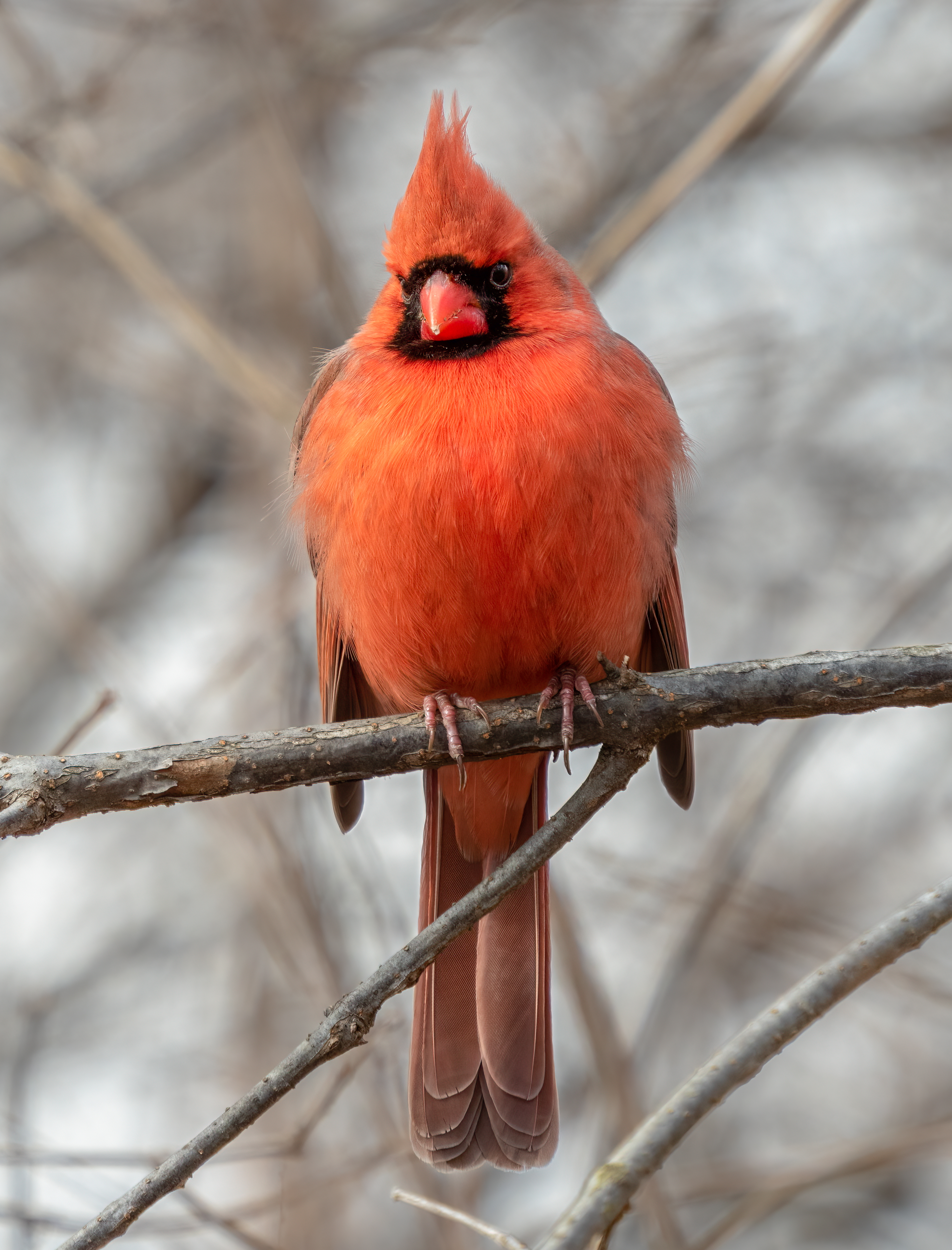
Northern cardinal

Order: Passeriformes Family: Cardinalidae

The cardinals are a family of robust, seed-eating birds with strong bills. They are typically associated with open woodland. The sexes usually have distinct plumages.

- Summer tanager (piranga vermillon), Piranga rubra
- Scarlet tanager (piranga écarlate), Piranga olivacea (B)
- Western tanager (piranga à tête rouge), Piranga ludoviciana (R)
- Northern cardinal (cardinal rouge), Cardinalis cardinalis (B)
- Rose-breasted grosbeak (cardinal à poitrine rose), Pheucticus ludovicianus (B)
- Black-headed grosbeak (cardinal à tête noire), Pheucticus melanocephalus (A)
- Blue grosbeak (guiraca bleu), Passerina caerulea
- Lazuli bunting (passerin azuré), Passerina amoena (A)
- Indigo bunting (passerin indigo), Passerina cyanea (B)
- Painted bunting (passerin nonpareil), Passerina ciris (R)
- Dickcissel (dickcissel d'Amérique), Spiza americana

== See also ==
- List of birds
- Lists of birds by region
- List of mammals of New Brunswick
