= List of birds of Michigan =

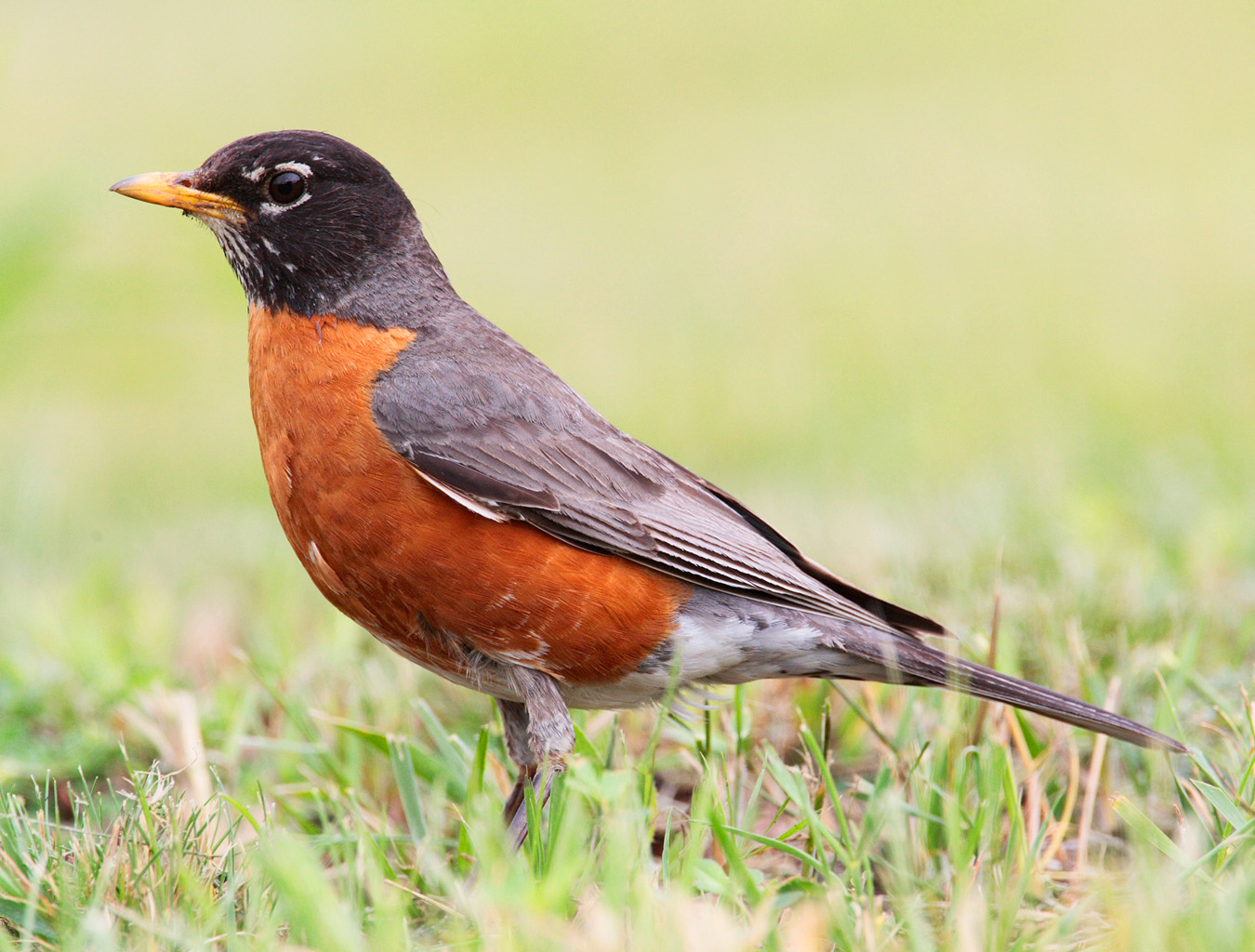
The American robin is the state bird of Michigan.

This list of birds of Michigan includes species documented in the U.S. state of Michigan and accepted by the Michigan Bird Records Committee (MBRC). As of January 2023, there are 456 species included in the official list. Of them, 92 are classed as accidental, 47 are classed as casual, seven have been introduced to North America, one is known to be extinct and another is believed to be, and two have been extirpated.

This is a comprehensive list of all bird species known to have occurred naturally in Michigan as permanent residents, summer residents, winter residents, transients, or vagrants. Non-native species that have not established self-sustaining populations, such as escapees from captivity, are excluded.

This list is presented in the taxonomic sequence of the Check-list of North and Middle American Birds, 7th edition through the 62nd Supplement, published by the American Ornithological Society (AOS). Common and scientific names are also those of the Check-list, except that the common names of families are from the Clements taxonomy because the AOS list does not include them.

The following codes are used to designate the status of certain species:

- (A) Accidental - recorded fewer than four times in the last 10 years per the MBRC
- (C) Casual - recorded at least four, but 30 or fewer, times in the last 10 years and in fewer than nine of the last 10 years per the MBRC
- (I) Introduced - population established in North America as result of direct or indirect human action
- (E) Extinct - a recent species that no longer exists
- (Ex) Extirpated - no longer found in Michigan but continues to exist elsewhere

== Ducks, geese, and waterfowl ==
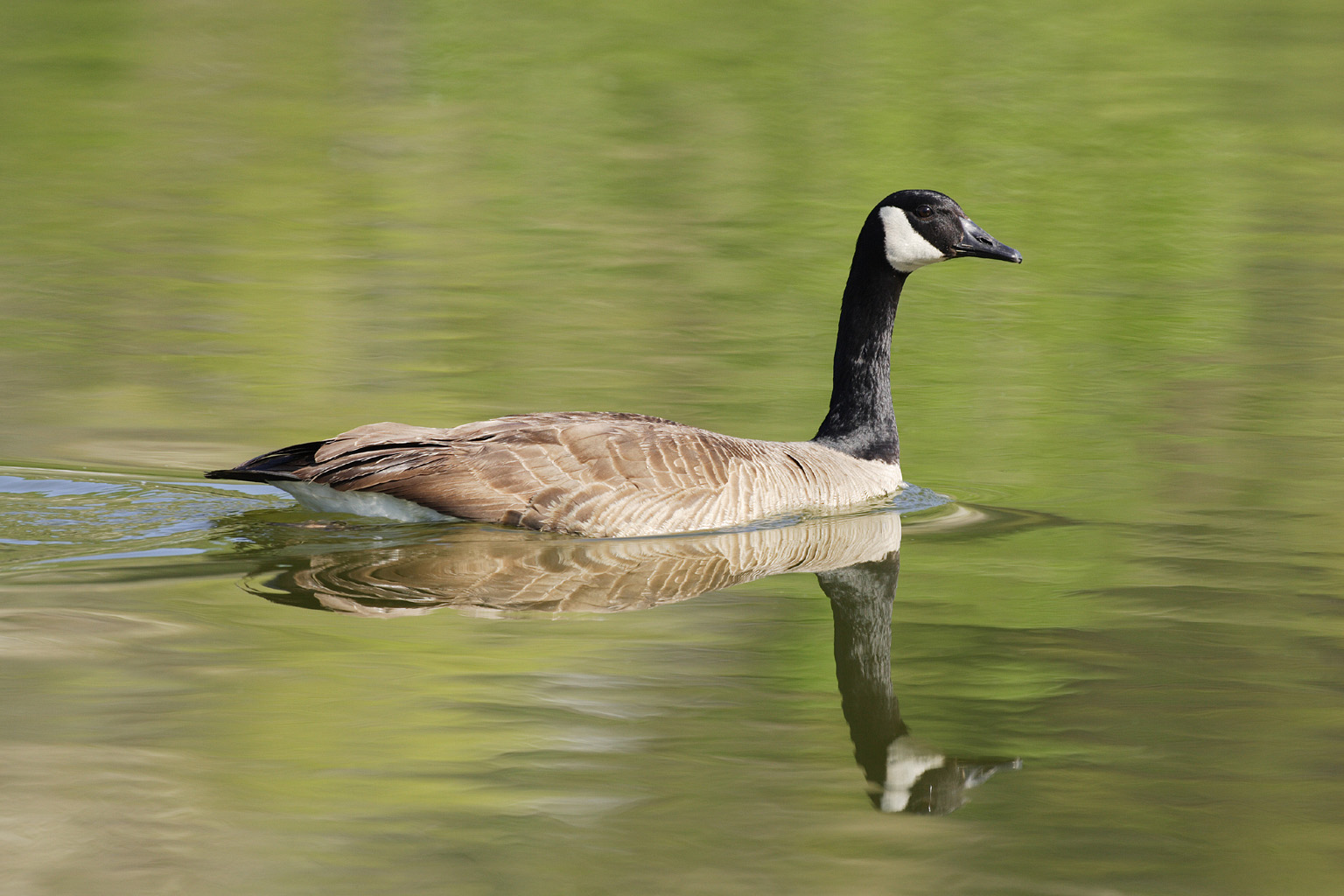
Canada goose

Order: Anseriformes Family: Anatidae

The family Anatidae includes the ducks and most duck-like waterfowl, such as geese and swans. These birds are adapted to an aquatic existence with webbed feet, bills that are flattened to a greater or lesser extent, and feathers that are excellent at shedding water due to special oils. Forty-four species have been recorded in Michigan.

- American black duck, Anas rubripes
- American wigeon, Mareca americana
- Barrow's goldeneye, Bucephala islandica (C)
- Black scoter, Melanitta americana
- Black-bellied whistling-duck, Dendrocygna autumnalis (C)
- Blue-winged teal, Spatula discors
- Brant, Branta bernicla (C)
- Bufflehead, Bucephala albeola
- Cackling goose, Branta hutchinsii
- Canada goose, Branta canadensis
- Canvasback, Aythya valisineria
- Cinnamon teal, Spatula cyanoptera (A)
- Common eider, Somateria mollissima (A)
- Common goldeneye, Bucephala clangula
- Common merganser, Mergus merganser
- Eurasian wigeon, Mareca penelope (C)
- Fulvous whistling-duck, Dendrocygna bicolor (A)
- Gadwall, Mareca strepera
- Garganey, Spatula querquedula (A)
- Greater scaup, Aythya marila
- Greater white-fronted goose, Anser albifrons
- Green-winged teal, Anas crecca
- Harlequin duck, Histrionicus histrionicus
- Hooded merganser, Lophodytes cucullatus
- King eider, Somateria spectabilis (C)
- Lesser scaup, Aythya affinis
- Long-tailed duck, Clangula hyemalis
- Mallard, Anas platyrhynchos
- Mute swan, Cygnus olor (I)
- Northern pintail, Anas acuta
- Northern shoveler, Spatula clypeata
- Pink-footed goose, Anser brachyrhynchus (A)
- Red-breasted merganser, Mergus serrator
- Redhead, Aythya americana
- Ring-necked duck, Aythya collaris
- Ross's goose, Anser rossii
- Ruddy duck, Oxyura jamaicensis
- Snow goose, Anser caerulescens
- Surf scoter, Melanitta perspicillata
- Trumpeter swan, Cygnus buccinator
- Tufted duck, Aythya fuligula (A)
- Tundra swan, Cygnus columbianus
- White-winged scoter, Melanitta deglandi
- Wood duck, Aix sponsa

== New World quail ==
Order: Galliformes Family: Odontophoridae

The New World quails are small, plump terrestrial birds only distantly related to the quails of the Old World, but named for their similar appearance and habits. One species has been recorded in Michigan.

- Northern bobwhite, Colinus virginianus (Ex)

== Pheasants, grouse, and allies ==
Order: Galliformes Family: Phasianidae

Phasianidae consists of the pheasants and their allies. These are terrestrial species, variable in size but generally plump with broad relatively short wings. Many species are gamebirds or have been domesticated as a food source for humans. Six species have been recorded in Michigan.

- Greater prairie-chicken, Tympanuchus cupido (Ex) (last recorded 1981)
- Ring-necked pheasant, Phasianus colchicus (I)
- Ruffed grouse, Bonasa umbellus
- Sharp-tailed grouse, Tympanuchus phasianellus
- Spruce grouse, Canachites canadensis
- Wild turkey, Meleagris gallopavo

== Grebes ==
Order: Podicipediformes Family: Podicipedidae

Grebes are small to medium-large freshwater diving birds. They have lobed toes and are excellent swimmers and divers. However, they have their feet placed far back on the body, making them quite ungainly on land. Five species have been recorded in Michigan.

- Eared grebe, Podiceps nigricollis
- Horned grebe, Podiceps auritus
- Pied-billed grebe, Podilymbus podiceps
- Red-necked grebe, Podiceps grisegena
- Western grebe, Aechmorphorus occidentalis (C)

== Pigeons and doves ==
Order: Columbiformes Family: Columbidae

Pigeons and doves are stout-bodied birds with short necks and short slender bills with a fleshy cere. Eight species have been recorded in Michigan.

- Band-tailed pigeon, Patagioenas fasciata (A)
- Common ground dove, Columbina passerina (C)
- Eurasian collared-dove, Streptopelia decaocto (I)
- Inca dove, Columbina inca (A)
- Mourning dove, Zenaida macroura
- Passenger pigeon, Ectopistes migratorius (E) (last record 1898)
- Rock pigeon, Columba livia (I)
- White-winged dove, Zenaida asiatica

== Cuckoos ==
Order: Cuculiformes Family: Cuculidae

The family Cuculidae includes cuckoos, roadrunners, and anis. These birds are of variable size with slender bodies, long tails, and strong legs. Three species have been recorded in Michigan.

- Groove-billed ani, Crotophaga sulcirostris (A)
- Yellow-billed cuckoo, Coccyzus americanus
- Black-billed cuckoo, Coccyzus erythropthalmus

== Nightjars and allies ==
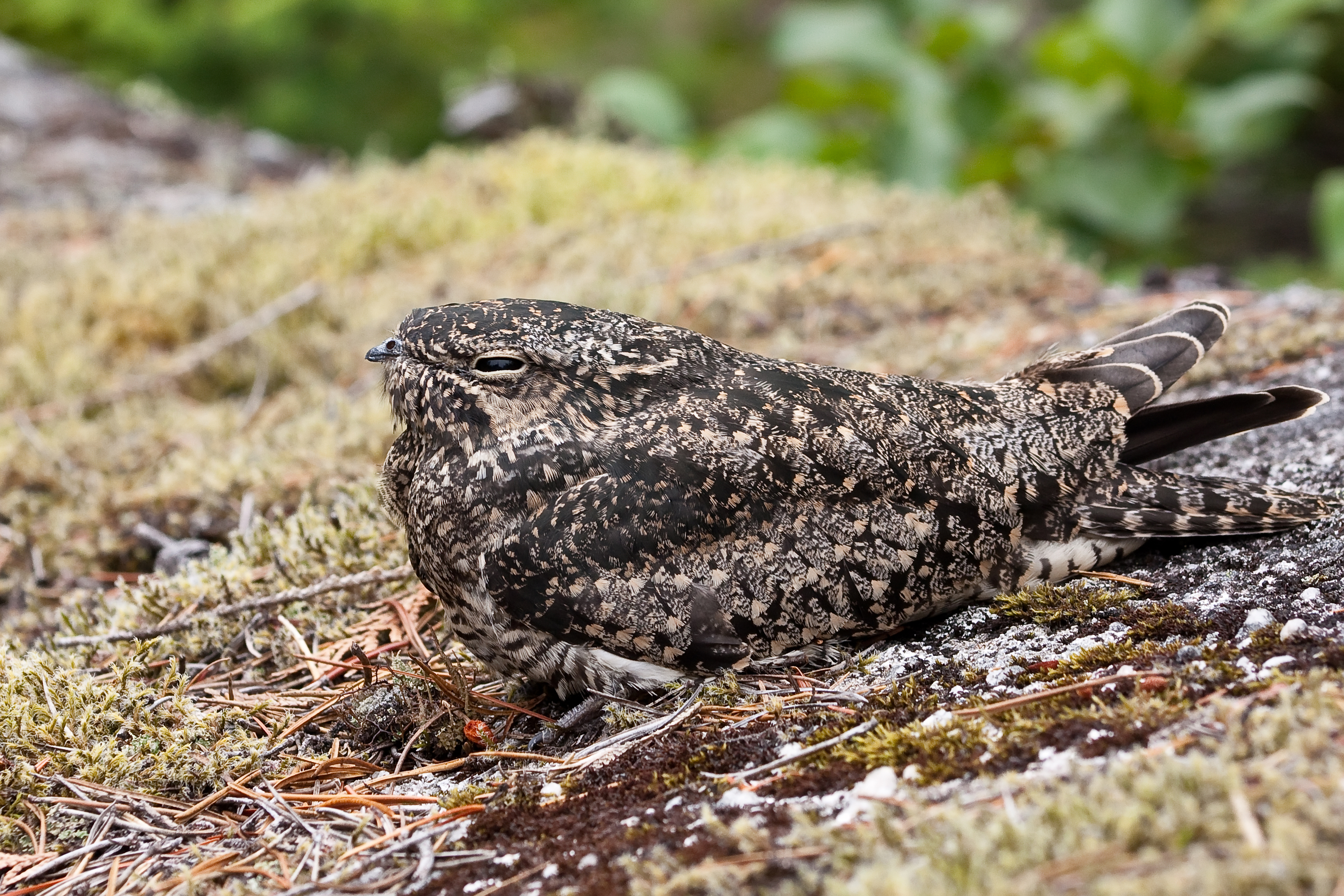
Common nighthawk

Order: Caprimulgiformes Family: Caprimulgidae

Nightjars are medium-sized nocturnal birds that usually nest on the ground. They have long wings, short legs, and very short bills. Most have small feet, of little use for walking, and long pointed wings. Their soft plumage is cryptically colored to resemble bark or leaves. Three species have been recorded in Michigan.

- Common nighthawk, Chordeiles minor
- Chuck-will's-widow, Antrostomus carolinensis
- Eastern whip-poor-will, Antrostomus vociferus

== Swifts ==
Order: Apodiformes Family: Apodidae

The swifts are small birds which spend the majority of their lives flying. These birds have very short legs and never settle voluntarily on the ground, perching instead only on vertical surfaces. Many swifts have very long, swept-back wings which resemble a crescent or boomerang. Three species have been recorded in Michigan.

- Chimney swift, Chaetura pelagica
- White-collared swift, Streptoprocne zonaris (A) (sight record only)
- White-throated swift, Aeronautes saxatalis (A)

== Hummingbirds ==
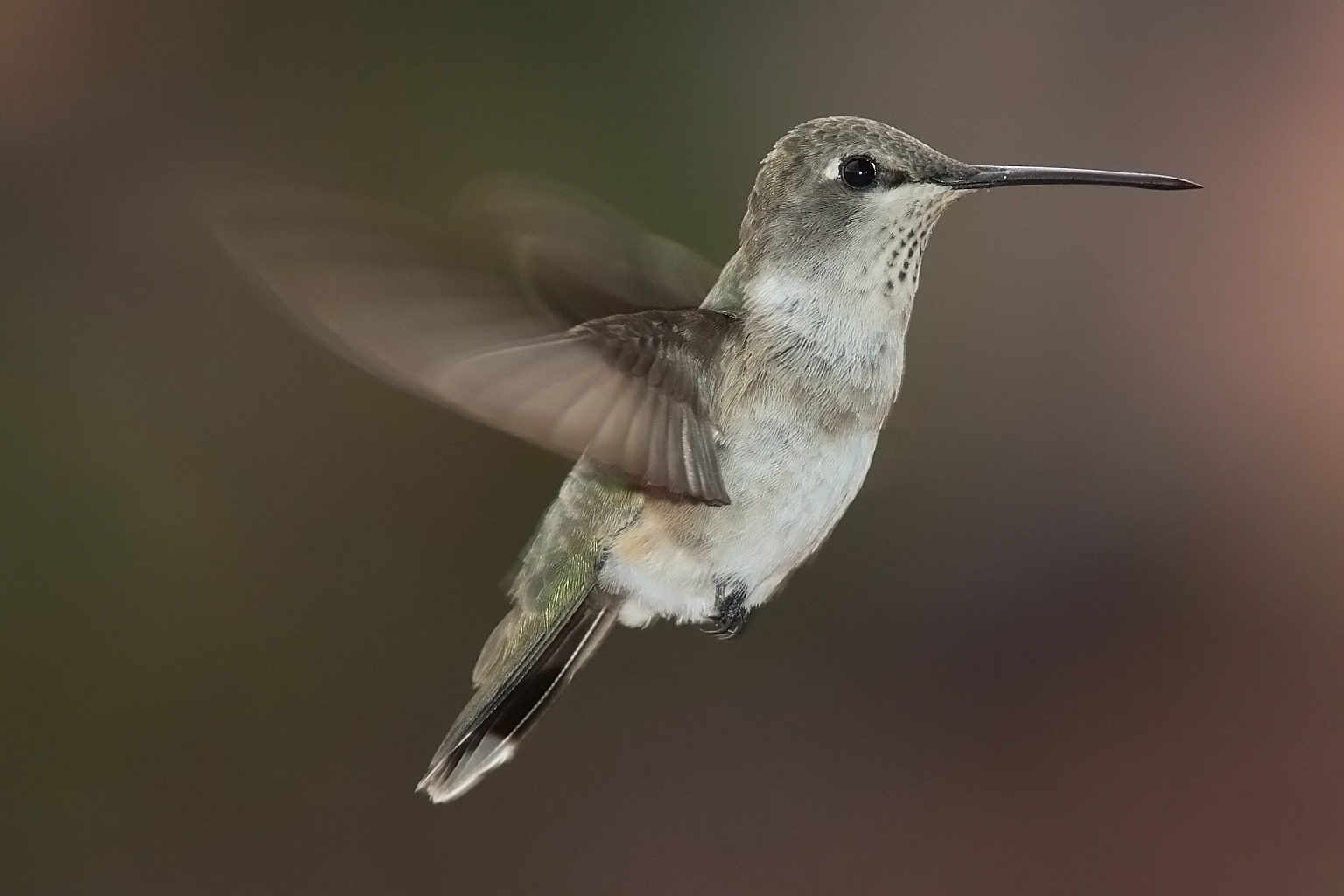
Black-chinned hummingbird

Order: Apodiformes Family: Trochilidae

Hummingbirds are small birds capable of hovering in mid-air due to the rapid flapping of their wings. They are the only birds that can fly backwards. Eight species have been recorded in Michigan.

- Anna's hummingbird, Colapte anna (A)
- Berylline hummingbird, Amazilia beryllina (A)
- Broad-billed hummingbird, Cynanthus latirostris (A)
- Costa's hummingbird, Colapte costae (A)
- Mexican violetear, Colibri thalassinus (C)
- Ruby-throated hummingbird, Archilochus colubris
- Rufous hummingbird, Selasphorus rufus
- White-eared hummingbird, Hylocharis leucotis (A)

== Rails, gallinules, and coots ==
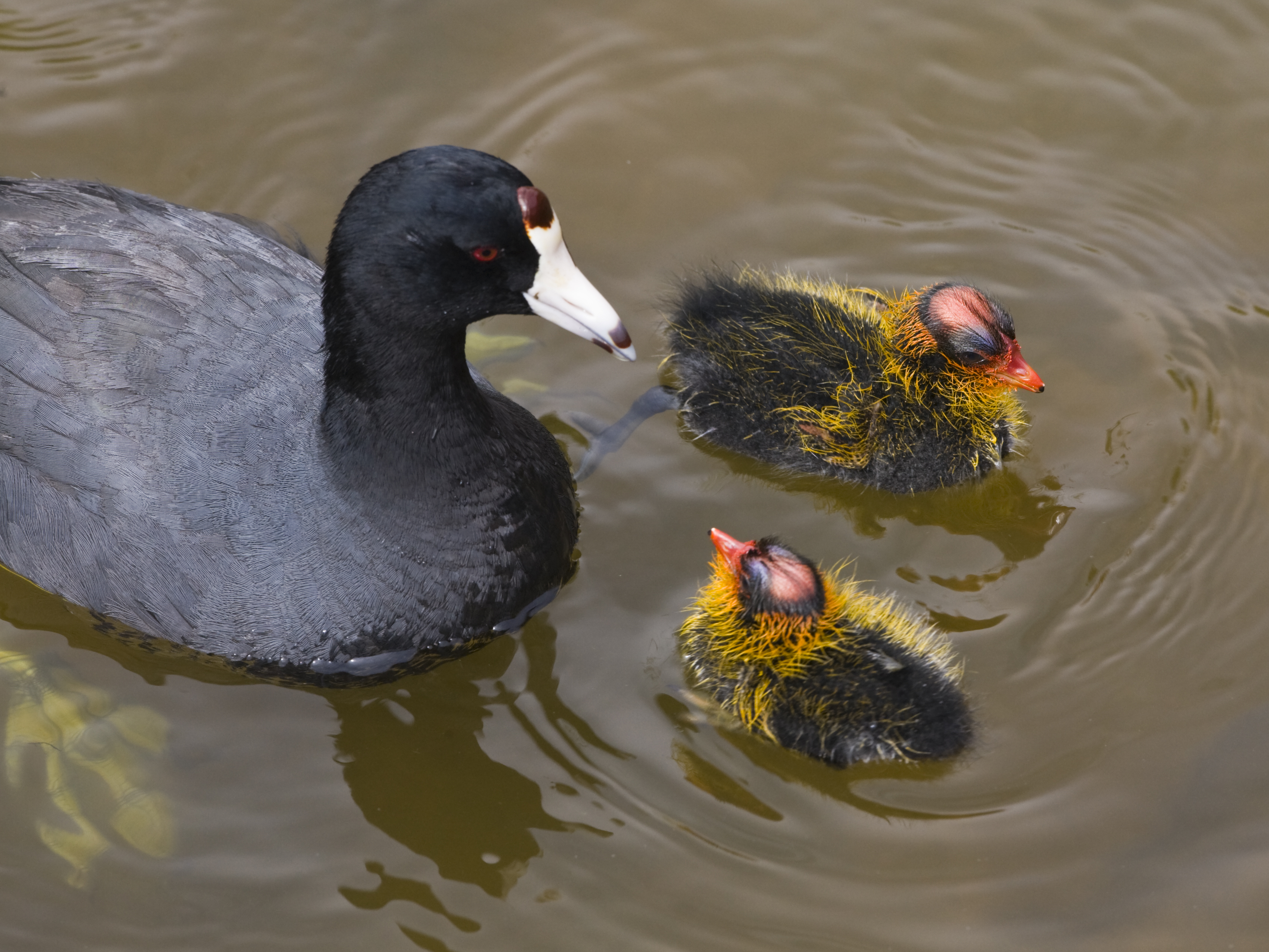
American coot

Order: Gruiformes Family: Rallidae

Rallidae is a large family of small to medium-sized birds which includes the rails, crakes, coots, and gallinules. The most typical family members occupy dense vegetation in damp environments near lakes, swamps, or rivers. In general they are shy and secretive birds, making them difficult to observe. Most species have strong legs and long toes which are well adapted to soft uneven surfaces. They tend to have short, rounded wings and tend to be weak fliers. Eight species have been recorded in Michigan.

- American coot, Fulica americana
- Purple gallinule, Porphyrio martinicus (C)
- Black rail, Laterallus jamaicensis (A)
- Common gallinule, Gallinula galeata
- King rail, Rallus elegans (C)
- Sora, Porzana carolina
- Virginia rail, Rallus limicola
- Yellow rail, Coturnicops noveboracensis

== Limpkin ==
Order: Gruiformes Family: Aramidae

The limpkin is an odd bird that looks like a large rail, but is skeletally closer to the cranes. One species has been recorded in Michigan.

- Limpkin, Aramus guarauna (A)

== Cranes ==
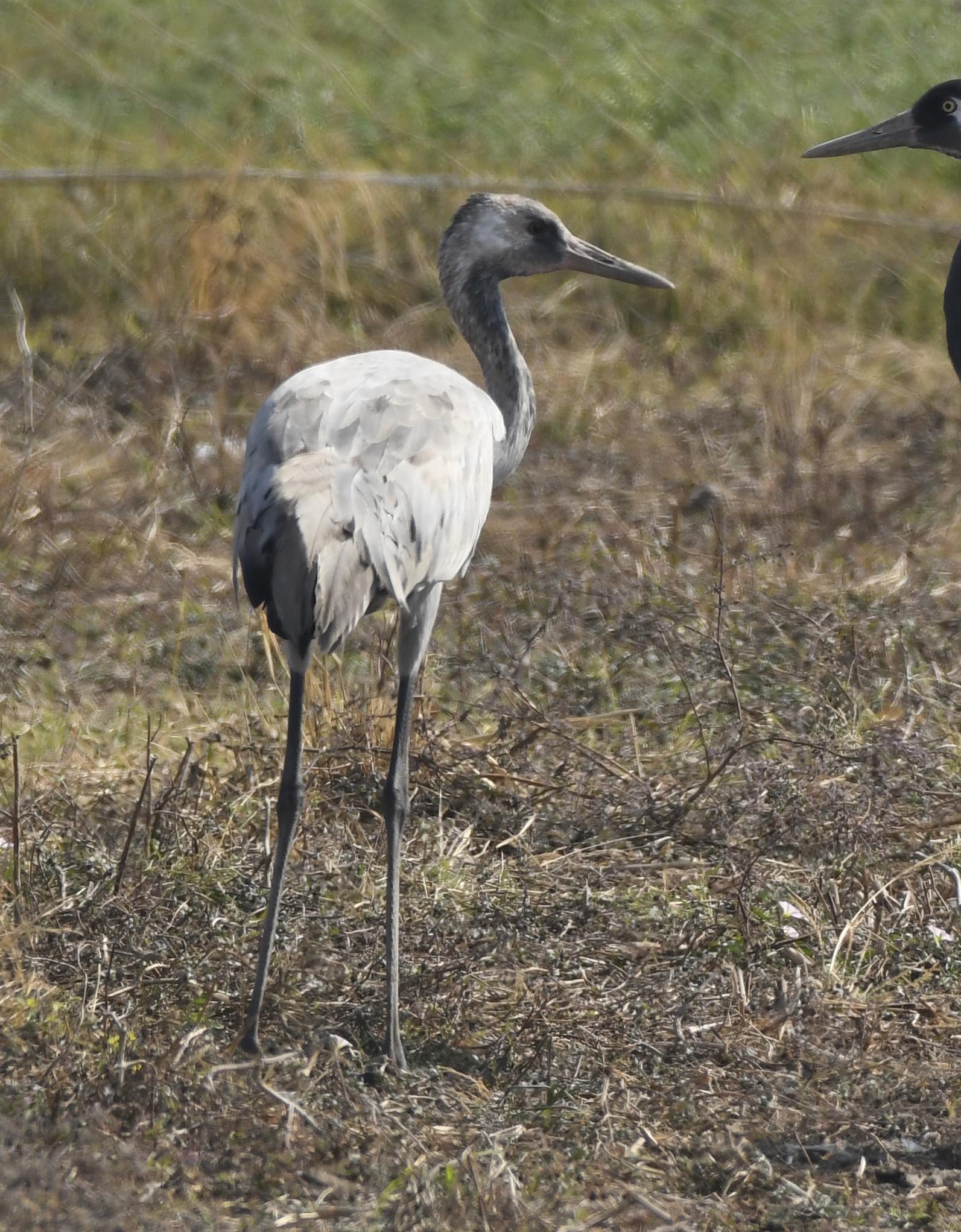
Common crane

Order: Gruiformes Family: Gruidae

Cranes are large, long-legged, and long-necked birds. Unlike the similar-looking but unrelated herons, cranes fly with necks outstretched, not pulled back. Most have elaborate and noisy courting displays or "dances". One species has been recorded in Michigan.

- Sandhill crane, Antigone canadensis

== Stilts and avocets ==
Order: Charadriiformes Family: Recurvirostridae

Recurvirostridae is a family of large wading birds which includes the avocets and stilts. The avocets have long legs and long up-curved bills. The stilts have extremely long legs and long, thin, straight bills. Two species have been recorded in Michigan.

- American avocet, Recurvirostra americana
- Black-necked stilt, Himantopus mexicanus (C)

== Plovers and lapwings ==
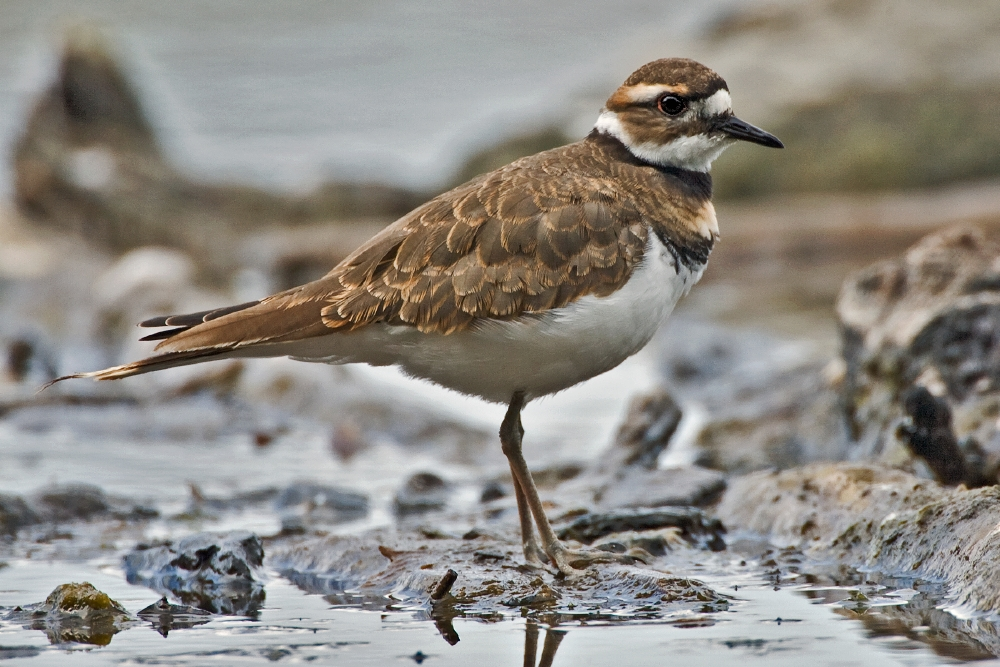
Killdeer

Order: Charadriiformes Family: Charadriidae

The family Charadriidae includes the plovers, dotterels, and lapwings. They are small to medium-sized birds with compact bodies, short thick necks, and long, usually pointed, wings. They are found in open country worldwide, mostly in habitats near water. Seven species have been recorded in Michigan.

- American golden-plover, Pluvialis dominica
- Black-bellied plover, Pluvialis squatarola
- Killdeer, Charadrius vociferus
- Piping plover, Charadrius melodus
- Semipalmated plover, Charadrius semipalmatus
- Snowy plover, Charadrius nivosus (A)
- Wilson's plover, Charadrius wilsonia (A)

== Sandpipers and allies ==
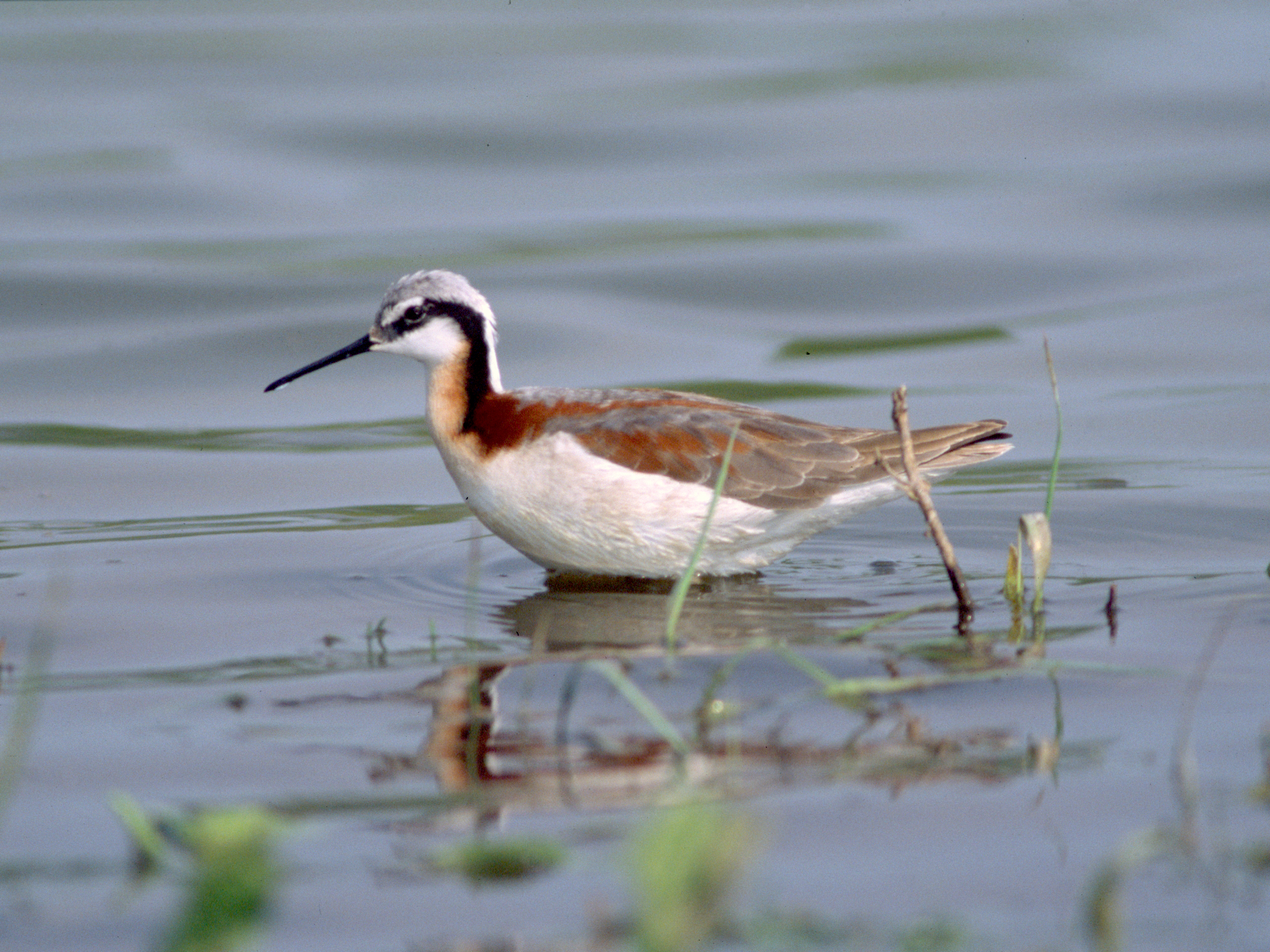
Wilson's phalarope

Order: Charadriiformes Family: Scolopacidae

Scolopacidae is a large diverse family of small to medium-sized shorebirds including the sandpipers, curlews, godwits, shanks, tattlers, woodcocks, snipes, dowitchers, and phalaropes. The majority of these species eat small invertebrates picked out of the mud or soil. Different lengths of legs and bills enable multiple species to feed in the same habitat, particularly on the coast, without direct competition for food. Thirty-six species have been recorded in Michigan.

- American woodcock, Scolopax minor
- Baird's sandpiper, Calidris bairdii
- Buff-breasted sandpiper, Calidris subruficollis
- Curlew sandpiper, Calidris ferruginea (A)
- Dunlin, Calidris alpina
- Eskimo curlew, Numenius borealis (A) (last recorded 1879, probably extinct)
- Greater yellowlegs, Tringa melanoleuca
- Hudsonian godwit, Limosa haemastica
- Whimbrel, Numenius phaeopus
- Least sandpiper, Calidris minutilla
- Lesser yellowlegs, Tringa flavipes
- Long-billed curlew, Numenius americanus (A)
- Long-billed dowitcher, Limnodromus scolopaceus
- Marbled godwit, Limosa fedoa
- Pectoral sandpiper, Calidris melanotos
- Purple sandpiper, Calidris maritima
- Red knot, Calidris canutus
- Red phalarope, Phalaropus fulicarius
- Red-necked phalarope, Phalaropus lobatus
- Ruddy turnstone, Arenaria interpres
- Ruff, Calidris pugnax (C)
- Sanderling, Calidris alba
- Semipalmated sandpiper, Calidris pusilla
- Sharp-tailed sandpiper, Calidris acuminata (A)
- Short-billed dowitcher, Limnodromus griseus
- Solitary sandpiper, Tringa solitaria
- Spotted redshank, Tringa erythropus (A)
- Spotted sandpiper, Actitis macularius
- Stilt sandpiper, Calidris himantopus
- Upland sandpiper, Bartramia longicauda
- Wandering tattler/gray-tailed tattler, Tringa incana/Tringa brevipes (A)
- Western sandpiper, Calidris mauri (C)
- White-rumped sandpiper, Calidris fuscicollis
- Willet, Tringa semipalmata
- Wilson's phalarope, Phalaropus tricolor
- Wilson's snipe, Gallinago delicata

== Skuas and jaegers ==
Order: Charadriiformes Family: Stercorariidae

Skuas and jaegers are in general medium to large birds, typically with gray or brown plumage, often with white markings on the wings. They have longish bills with hooked tips and webbed feet with sharp claws. They look like large dark gulls, but have a fleshy cere above the upper mandible. They are strong, acrobatic fliers. Three species have been recorded in Michigan.

- Long-tailed jaeger, Stercorarius longicaudus (C)
- Parasitic jaeger, Stercorarius parasiticus
- Pomarine jaeger, Stercorarius pomarinus (C)

== Auks, murres, and puffins ==
Order: Charadriiformes Family: Alcidae

The family Alcidae includes auks, murres, and puffins. These are short winged birds that live on the open sea and normally only come ashore for breeding. Three species have been recorded in Michigan.

- Dovekie, Alle alle (A)
- Thick-billed murre, Uria lomvia (A)
- Ancient murrelet, Synthliboarmphus antiquus (C)

== Gulls, terns, and skimmers ==
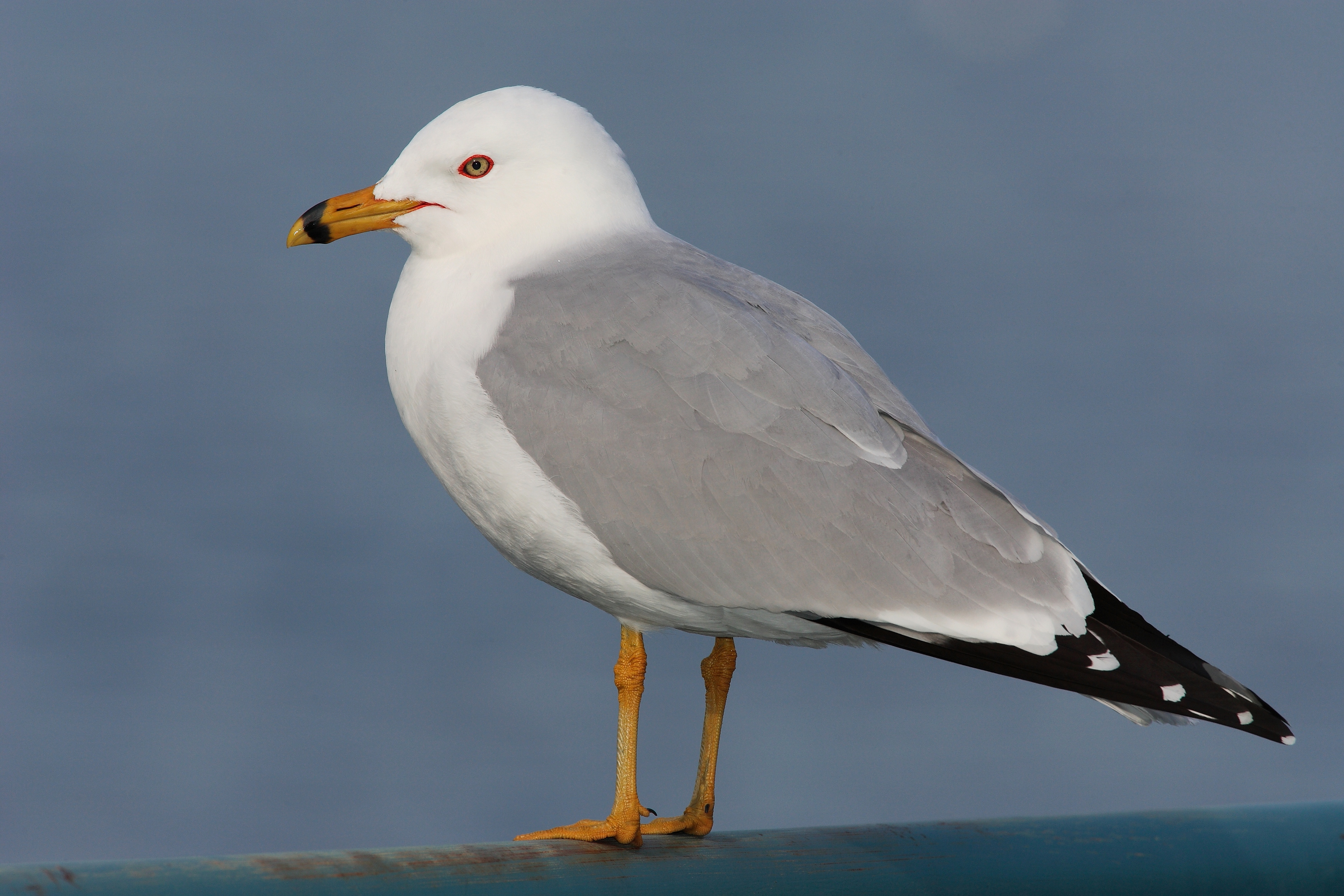
Ring-billed gull

Order: Charadriiformes Family: Laridae

Laridae is a family of medium to large seabirds and includes gulls, terns, kittiwakes, and skimmers. They are typically gray or white, often with black markings on the head or wings. They have stout, longish bills and webbed feet. Thirty-one species have been recorded in Michigan.

- Herring gull, Larus argentatus
- Arctic tern, Sterna paradisaea (C)
- Black skimmer, Rynchops niger (A)
- Black tern, Chlidonias niger
- Black-headed gull, Chroicocephalus ridibundus (C)
- Black-legged kittiwake, Rissa tridactyla
- Bonaparte's gull, Chroicocephalus philadelphia
- California gull, Larus californicus
- Caspian tern, Hydroprogne caspia
- Common tern, Sterna hirundo
- Forster's tern, Sterna forsteri
- Franklin's gull, Leucophaeus pipixcan
- Glaucous gull, Larus hyperboreus
- Glaucous-winged gull, Larus glaucescens (A)
- Great black-backed gull, Larus marinus
- Gull-billed tern, Gelochelidon nilotica (A)
- Heermann's gull, Larus heermanni (A)
- Iceland gull, Larus glaucoides
- Ivory gull, Pagophila eburnea (A)
- Laughing gull, Leucophaeus atricilla
- Least tern, Sternula antillarum (A)
- Lesser black-backed gull, Larus fuscus
- Little gull, Hydrocoleus minutus
- Ring-billed gull, Larus delawarensis
- Roseate tern, Sterna dougallii (A) (sight record only)
- Ross's gull, Rhodostethia rosea (A)
- Royal tern, Thalasseus maximus (A)
- Sabine's gull, Xema sabini
- Sandwich tern, Thalasseus sandvicensis (A) (sight record only)
- Short-billed gull, Larus brachyrhynchus (A)
- Slaty-backed gull, Larus schistisagus (C)

== Loons ==
Order: Gaviiformes Family: Gaviidae

Loons are aquatic birds the size of a large duck, to which they are unrelated. Their plumage is largely gray or black, and they have spear-shaped bills. Loons swim well and fly adequately, but are almost hopeless on land, because their legs are placed towards the rear of the body. Four species have been recorded in Michigan.

- Common loon, Gavia immer
- Pacific loon, Gavia pacifica
- Red-throated loon, Gavia stellata
- Yellow-billed loon, Gavia adamsii (A)

== Shearwaters and petrels ==
Order: Procellariiformes Family: Procellariidae

The procellariids are the main group of medium-sized "true petrels", characterized by united nostrils with medium septum and a long outer functional primary. Two species have been recorded in Michigan.

- Great shearwater, Ardenna gravis (A)
- Manx shearwater, Puffinus puffinus (A)

== Storks ==
Order: Ciconiiformes Family: Ciconiidae

Storks are large, heavy, long-legged, long-necked wading birds with long stout bills and wide wingspans. They lack the powder down that other wading birds such as herons, spoonbills, and ibises use to clean off fish slime. Storks lack a pharynx and are mute. One species has been recorded in Michigan.

- Wood stork, Mycteria americana (A)

== Frigatebirds ==
Order: Suliformes Family: Fregatidae

Frigatebirds are large seabirds usually found over tropical oceans. They are large, black, or black-and-white, with long wings and deeply forked tails. The males have colored inflatable throat pouches. They do not swim or walk and cannot take off from a flat surface. Having the largest wingspan-to-body-weight ratio of any bird, they are essentially aerial, able to stay aloft for more than a week. Two species have been recorded in Michigan.

- Lesser frigatebird, Fregata ariel (A)
- Magnificent frigatebird, Fregata magnificens (A)

== Boobies and gannets ==
Order: Suliformes Family: Sulidae

The sulids comprise the gannets and boobies. Both groups are medium-large coastal seabirds that plunge-dive for fish. One species has been recorded in Michigan.

- Northern gannet, Morus bassanus (A)

== Anhingas ==
Order: Suliformes Family: Anhingidae

Anhingas are cormorant-like water birds with very long necks and long, straight beaks. They are fish eaters which often swim with only their neck above the water. One species has been recorded in Michigan.

- Anhinga, Anhinga anhinga (C)

== Cormorants and shags ==
Order: Suliformes Family: Phalacrocoracidae

Cormorants are medium-to-large aquatic birds, usually with mainly dark plumage and areas of colored skin on the face. The bill is long, thin, and sharply hooked. Their feet are four-toed and webbed, a distinguishing feature among the order Suliformes. Two species have been recorded in Michigan.

- Double-crested cormorant, Nannopterum auritum
- Neotropic cormorant, Nannopterum brasilianum (A)

== Pelicans ==
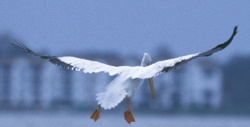
American white pelican

Order: Pelecaniformes Family: Pelecanidae

Pelicans are very large water birds with a distinctive pouch under their beak. Like other birds in the order Pelecaniformes, they have four webbed toes. Two species have been recorded in Michigan.

- American white pelican, Pelecanus erythrorhynchos
- Brown pelican, Pelecanus occidentalis (A)

== Herons, egrets, and bitterns ==
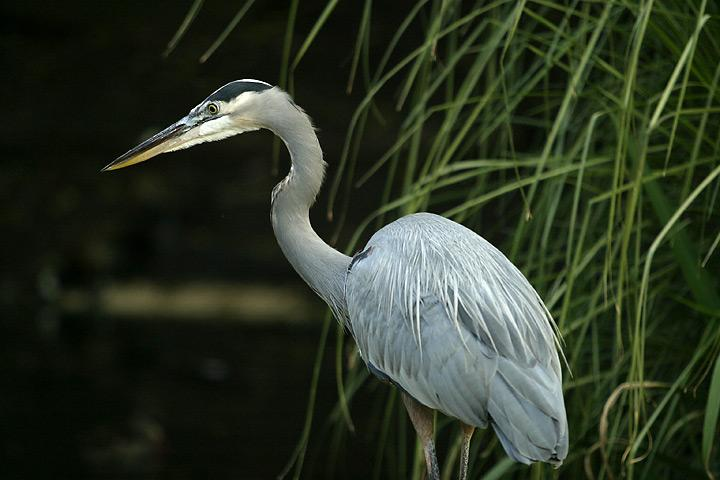
Great blue heron

Order: Pelecaniformes Family: Ardeidae

The family Ardeidae contains the herons, egrets, and bitterns. Herons and egrets are medium to large wading birds with long necks and legs. Bitterns tend to be shorter necked and more secretive. Members of Ardeidae fly with their necks retracted, unlike other long-necked birds such as storks, ibises, and spoonbills. Twelve species have been recorded in Michigan.

- American bittern, Botaurus lentiginosus
- Black-crowned night-heron, Nycticorax nycticorax
- Cattle egret, Bubulcus ibis
- Great blue heron, Ardea herodias
- Great egret, Ardea alba
- Green heron, Butorides virescens
- Least bittern, Ixobrychus exilis
- Little blue heron, Egretta caerulea (C)
- Reddish egret, Egretta rufescens (A) (sight record only)
- Snowy egret, Egretta thula
- Tricolored heron, Egretta tricolor (C)
- Yellow-crowned night-heron, Nyctanassa violacea (C)

== Ibises and spoonbills ==
Order: Pelecaniformes Family: Threskiornithidae

The family Threskiornithidae includes the ibises and spoonbills. They have long, broad wings. Their bodies tend to be elongated, the neck more so, with rather long legs. The bill is also long, decurved in the case of the ibises, straight and distinctively flattened in the spoonbills. Four species have been recorded in Michigan.

- White ibis, Eudocimus albus (C)
- Glossy ibis, Plegadis falcinellus (C)
- Roseate spoonbill, Platalea ajaja (A)
- White-faced ibis, Plegadis chihi

== New World vultures ==
Order: Cathartiformes Family: Cathartidae

The New World vultures are not closely related to Old World vultures, but superficially resemble them because of convergent evolution. Like the Old World vultures, they are scavengers, however, unlike Old World vultures, which find carcasses by sight, New World vultures have a good sense of smell with which they locate carcasses. Two species have been recorded in Michigan.

- Black vulture, Coragyps atratus
- Turkey vulture, Cathartes aura

== Osprey ==
Order: Accipitriformes Family: Pandionidae

Pandionidae is a monotypic family of fish-eating birds of prey, possessing a very large, powerful hooked beak for tearing flesh from their prey, strong legs, powerful talons, and keen eyesight.

- Osprey, Pandion haliaetus

== Hawks, eagles, and kites ==
Order: Accipitriformes Family: Accipitridae

Accipitridae is a family of birds of prey, which includes hawks, eagles, kites, harriers, and Old World vultures. These birds have very large powerful hooked beaks for tearing flesh from their prey, strong legs, powerful talons, and keen eyesight. Fifteen species have been recorded in Michigan.

- Bald eagle, Haliaeetus leucocephalus
- Broad-winged hawk, Buteo platypterus
- Cooper's hawk, Accipiter cooperii
- Ferruginous hawk, Buteo regalis (A)
- Golden eagle, Aquila chrysaetos
- Mississippi kite, Ictinia mississippiensis (C)
- American goshawk, Accipiter atricapillus
- Northern harrier, Circus hudsonius
- Red-shouldered hawk, Buteo lineatus
- Red-tailed hawk, Buteo jamaicensis
- Rough-legged hawk, Buteo lagopus
- Sharp-shinned hawk, Accipiter striatus
- Short-tailed hawk, Buteo brachyurus (A)
- Swainson's hawk, Buteo swainsoni
- Swallow-tailed kite, Elanoides forficatus (C)

== Barn-owls ==
Order: Strigiformes Family: Tytonidae

Barn-owls are medium to large owls with large heads and characteristic heart-shaped faces. They have long strong legs with powerful talons. One species has been recorded in Michigan.

- Barn owl, Tyto furcata (C)

== Owls ==
Order: Strigiformes Family: Strigidae

Typical owls are small to large solitary nocturnal birds of prey. They have large forward-facing eyes and ears, a hawk-like beak, and a conspicuous circle of feathers around each eye called a facial disk. Eleven species have been recorded in Michigan.

- Barred owl, Strix varia
- Boreal owl, Aegolius funereus
- Burrowing owl, Athene cunicularia (A)
- Eastern screech-owl, Megascops asio
- Great gray owl, Strix nebulosa
- Great horned owl, Bubo virginianus
- Long-eared owl, Asio otus
- Northern hawk owl, Surnia ulula
- Northern saw-whet owl, Aegolius acadicus
- Short-eared owl, Asio flammeus
- Snowy owl, Bubo scandiacus

== Kingfishers ==
Order: Coraciiformes Family: Alcedinidae

Kingfishers are medium-sized birds with large heads, long, pointed bills, short legs, and stubby tails. One species has been recorded in Michigan.

- Belted kingfisher, Megaceryle alcyon

== Woodpeckers ==
Order: Piciformes Family: Picidae

Woodpeckers are small to medium-sized birds with chisel-like beaks, short legs, stiff tails, and long tongues used for capturing insects. Some species have feet with two toes pointing forward and two backward, while several species have only three toes. Many woodpeckers have the habit of tapping noisily on tree trunks with their beaks. Eleven species have been recorded in Michigan.

- American three-toed woodpecker, Picoides dorsalis (C)
- Black-backed woodpecker, Picoides arcticus
- Downy woodpecker, Dryobates pubescens
- Golden-fronted woodpecker, Melanerpes aurifrons (A)
- Hairy woodpecker, Dryobates villosus
- Lewis's woodpecker, Melanerpes lewis (A)
- Northern flicker, Colaptes auratus
- Pileated woodpecker, Dryocopus pileatus
- Red-bellied woodpecker, Melanerpes carolinus
- Red-headed woodpecker, Melanerpes erythrocephalus
- Yellow-bellied sapsucker, Sphyrapicus varius

== Falcons and caracaras ==
Order: Falconiformes Family: Falconidae

Falconidae is a family of diurnal birds of prey, notably the falcons and caracaras. They differ from hawks, eagles, and kites in that they kill with their beaks instead of their talons. Six species have been recorded in Michigan.

- American kestrel, Falco sparverius
- Crested caracara, Caracara plancus (A)
- Gyrfalcon, Falco rusticolus
- Merlin, Falco columbarius
- Peregrine falcon, Falco peregrinus
- Prairie falcon, Falco mexicanus (A)

== Tyrant flycatchers ==
Order: Passeriformes Family: Tyrannidae

Tyrant flycatchers are Passerine birds which occur throughout North and South America. They superficially resemble the Old World flycatchers, but are more robust and have stronger bills. They do not have the sophisticated vocal capabilities of the songbirds. Most, but not all, are rather plain. As the name implies, most are insectivorous. Twenty species have been recorded in Michigan.

- Acadian flycatcher, Empidonax virescens
- Alder flycatcher, Empidonax alnorum
- Ash-throated flycatcher, Myiarchus cinerascens (C)
- Couch's kingbird, Tyrannus couchii (A)
- Eastern kingbird, Tyrannus tyrannus
- Eastern phoebe, Sayornis phoebe
- Eastern wood-pewee, Contopus virens
- Fork-tailed flycatcher, Tyrannus savana (C)
- Gray kingbird, Tyrannus dominicensis (A)
- Great crested flycatcher, Myiarchus crinitus
- Hammond's flycatcher, Empidonax hammondii (A)
- Least flycatcher, Empidonax minimus
- Olive-sided flycatcher, Contopus cooperi
- Say's phoebe, Sayornis saya (C)
- Scissor-tailed flycatcher, Tyrannus forficatus
- Tropical kingbird, Tyrannus melancholicus (A)
- Vermilion flycatcher, Pyrocephalus rubinus (C)
- Western kingbird, Tyrannus verticalis
- Willow flycatcher, Empidonax traillii
- Yellow-bellied flycatcher, Empidonax flaviventris

== Vireos, shrike-babblers, and erpornis ==
Order: Passeriformes Family: Vireonidae

The vireos are a group of small to medium-sized passerine birds. They are typically greenish in color and resemble wood warblers apart from their heavier bills. Nine species have been recorded in Michigan.

- Bell's vireo, Vireo bellii (C)
- Black-capped vireo, Vireo atricapilla (A) (sight record only)
- Blue-headed vireo, Vireo solitarius
- Philadelphia vireo, Vireo philadelphicus
- Plumbeous vireo, Vireo plumbeus (A)
- Red-eyed vireo, Vireo olivaceus
- Warbling vireo, Vireo gilvus
- White-eyed vireo, Vireo griseus
- Yellow-throated vireo, Vireo flavifrons

== Shrikes ==
Order: Passeriformes Family: Laniidae

Shrikes are passerine birds known for their habit of catching other birds and small animals and impaling the uneaten portions of their bodies on thorns. A shrike's beak is hooked, like that of a typical bird of prey. Two species have been recorded in Michigan.

- Loggerhead shrike, Lanius ludovicianus
- Northern shrike, Lanius borealis

== Crows, jays, and magpies ==
Order: Passeriformes Family: Corvidae

The family Corvidae includes crows, ravens, jays, choughs, magpies, treepies, nutcrackers, and ground jays. Corvids are above average in size among the Passeriformes, and some of the larger species show high levels of intelligence. Seven species have been recorded in Michigan.

- American crow, Corvus brachyrhynchos
- Black-billed magpie, Pica hudsonia (C)
- Blue jay, Cyanocitta cristata
- Canada jay, Perisoreus canadensis
- Clark's nutcracker, Nucifraga columbiana (A)
- Common raven, Corvus corax
- Fish crow, Corvus ossifragus

== Tits, chickadees, and titmice ==
Order: Passeriformes Family: Paridae

The Paridae are mainly small stocky woodland species with short stout bills. Some have crests. They are adaptable birds, with a mixed diet including seeds and insects. Four species have been recorded in Michigan.

- Black-capped chickadee, Poecile atricapilla
- Boreal chickadee, Poecile hudsonica
- Carolina chickadee, Poecile carolinensis (A)
- Tufted titmouse, Baeolophus bicolor

== Larks ==
Order: Passeriformes Family: Alaudidae

Larks are small terrestrial birds with often extravagant songs and display flights. Most larks are fairly dull in appearance. Their food is insects and seeds. One species has been recorded in Michigan.

- Horned lark, Eremophila alpestris

== Swallows ==
Order: Passeriformes Family: Hirundinidae

The family Hirundinidae is adapted to aerial feeding. They have a slender streamlined body, long pointed wings and a short bill with a wide gape. The feet are adapted to perching rather than walking, and the front toes are partially joined at the base. Eight species have been recorded in Michigan.

- Cliff swallow, Petrochelidon pyrrhonota
- Bank swallow, Riparia riparia
- Barn swallow, Hirundo rustica
- Cave swallow, Petrochelidon fulva (C)
- Northern rough-winged swallow, Stelgidopteryx serripennis
- Purple martin, Progne subis
- Tree swallow, Tachycineta bicolor
- Violet-green swallow, Tachycineta thalassina (A)

== Kinglets ==
Order: Passeriformes Family: Regulidae

The kinglets are a small family of birds which resemble the titmice. They are very small insectivorous birds. The adults have colored crowns, giving rise to their names. Two species have been recorded in Michigan.

- Golden-crowned kinglet, Regulus satrapa
- Ruby-crowned kinglet, Corthylio calendula

== Waxwings ==
Order: Passeriformes Family: Bombycillidae

The waxwings are a group of birds with soft silky plumage and unique red tips to some of the wing feathers. In the Bohemian and cedar waxwings, these tips look like sealing wax and give the group its name. These are arboreal birds of northern forests. They live on insects in summer and berries in winter. Two species have been recorded in Michigan.

- Bohemian waxwing, Bombycilla garrulus
- Cedar waxwing, Bombycilla cedrorum

== Nuthatches ==
Order: Passeriformes Family: Sittidae

Nuthatches are small woodland birds. They have the unusual ability to climb down trees head first, unlike other birds which can only go upwards. Nuthatches have big heads, short tails, and powerful bills and feet. Two species have been recorded in Michigan.

- Red-breasted nuthatch, Sitta canadensis
- White-breasted nuthatch, Sitta carolinensis

== Treecreepers ==
Order: Passeriformes Family: Certhiidae

Treecreepers are small woodland birds, brown above and white below. They have thin pointed down-curved bills, which they use to extricate insects from bark. They have stiff tail feathers, like woodpeckers, which they use to support themselves on vertical trees. One species has been recorded in Michigan.

- Brown creeper, Certhia americana

== Gnatcatchers ==
Order: Passeriformes Family: Polioptilidae

These dainty birds resemble Old World warblers in their structure and habits, moving restlessly through the foliage seeking insects. The gnatcatchers are mainly soft bluish gray in color and have the typical insectivore's long sharp bill. Many species have distinctive black head patterns (especially males) and long, regularly cocked, black-and-white tails. One species has been recorded in Michigan.

- Blue-gray gnatcatcher, Polioptila caerulea

== Wrens ==
Order: Passeriformes Family: Troglodytidae

Wrens are small and inconspicuous birds, except for their loud songs. They have short wings and thin down-turned bills. Several species often hold their tails upright. All are insectivorous. Seven species have been recorded in Michigan.

- Bewick's wren, Thryomanes bewickii (A)
- Carolina wren, Thryothorus ludovicianus
- House wren, Troglodytes aedon
- Marsh wren, Cistothorus palustris
- Rock wren, Salpinctes obsoletus (A)
- Sedge wren, Cistothorus platensis
- Winter wren, Troglodytes hiemalis

== Mockingbirds and thrashers ==
Order: Passeriformes Family: Mimidae

The mimids are a family of passerine birds which includes thrashers, mockingbirds, tremblers and the New World catbirds. These birds are notable for their vocalization, especially their remarkable ability to mimic a wide variety of birds and other sounds heard outdoors. The species tend towards dull grays and browns in their appearance. Four species have been recorded in Michigan.

- Brown thrasher, Toxostoma rufum
- Gray catbird, Dumetella carolinensis
- Northern mockingbird, Mimus polyglottos
- Sage thrasher, Oreoscoptes montanus (A)

== Starlings ==
Order: Passeriformes Family: Sturnidae

Starlings are small to medium-sized passerine birds. They are medium-sized passerines with strong feet. Their flight is strong and direct and they are very gregarious. Their preferred habitat is fairly open country, and they eat insects and fruit. Plumage is typically dark with a metallic sheen. One species has been recorded in Michigan.

- European starling, Sturnus vulgaris (I)

== Thrushes and allies ==
Order: Passeriformes Family: Turdidae

The thrushes are a group of passerine birds that occur mainly but not exclusively in the Old World. They are plump, soft plumaged, small to medium-sized insectivores or sometimes omnivores, often feeding on the ground. Many have attractive songs. Ten species have been recorded in Michigan.

- American robin, Turdus migratorius
- Eastern bluebird, Sialia sialis
- Gray-cheeked thrush, Catharus minimus
- Hermit thrush, Catharus guttatus
- Mountain bluebird, Sialia currucoides (C)
- Swainson's thrush, Catharus ustulatus
- Townsend's solitaire, Myadestes townsendi
- Varied thrush, Ixoreus naevius
- Veery, Catharus fuscescens
- Wood thrush, Hylocichla mustelina

== Old World flycatchers ==
Order: Passeriformes Family: Muscicapidae

The Old World flycatchers are a large family of small passerine birds. These are mainly small arboreal insectivores, many of which, as the name implies, take their prey on the wing. One species has been recorded in Michigan.

- Northern wheatear, Oenanthe oenanthe (A)

== Old World sparrows ==
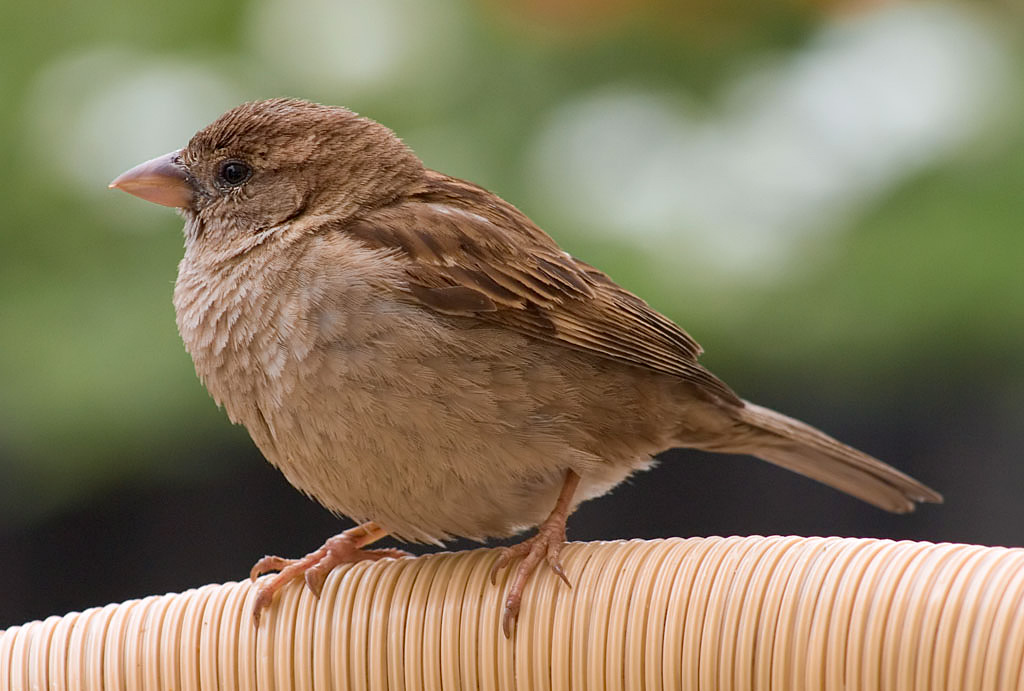
House sparrow

Order: Passeriformes Family: Passeridae

Old World sparrows are small passerine birds. In general, sparrows tend to be small plump brownish or grayish birds with short tails and short powerful beaks. Sparrows are seed eaters, but they also consume small insects. Two species have been recorded in Michigan.

- House sparrow, Passer domesticus (I)
- Eurasian tree sparrow, Passer montanus (C)(I)

== Wagtails and pipits ==
Order: Passeriformes Family: Motacillidae

Motacillidae is a family of small passerine birds with medium to long tails. They include the wagtails, longclaws, and pipits. They are slender ground-feeding insectivores of open country. Three species have been recorded in Michigan.

- American pipit, Anthus rubescens
- Sprague's pipit, Anthus spragueii (A)
- White wagtail, Motacilla alba (A)

== Finches, euphonias, and allies ==
Order: Passeriformes Family: Fringillidae

Finches are seed-eating passerine birds, that are small to moderately large and have a strong beak, usually conical and in some species very large. All have twelve tail feathers and nine primaries. These birds have a bouncing flight with alternating bouts of flapping and gliding on closed wings, and most sing well. Twelve species have been recorded in Michigan.

- American goldfinch, Spinus tristis
- Brambling, Fringilla montifringilla (A)
- Cassin's finch, Haemorhous cassinii (A)
- Common redpoll, Acanthis flammea
- Evening grosbeak, Coccothraustes vespertinus
- Gray-crowned rosy-finch, Leucosticte tephrocotis (A)
- Hoary redpoll, Acanthis hornemanni
- House finch, Haemorhous mexicanus (native to the southwestern U.S.; introduced in the east)
- Pine grosbeak, Pinicola enucleator
- Pine siskin, Spinus pinus
- Purple finch, Haemorhous purpureus
- Red crossbill, Loxia curvirostra
- White-winged crossbill, Loxia leucoptera

== Longspurs and snow buntings ==
Order: Passeriformes Family: Calcariidae

The Calcariidae are a group of passerine birds that were traditionally grouped with the New World sparrows, but differ in a number of respects and are usually found in open grassy areas. Five species have been recorded in Michigan.

- Chestnut-collared longspur, Calcarius ornatus (A)
- Lapland longspur, Calcarius lapponicus
- Smith's longspur, Calcarius pictus (C)
- Snow bunting, Plectrophenax nivalis
- Thick-billed longspur, Rhynchophanes mccownii (A)

== New World sparrows ==
Order: Passeriformes Family: Passerellidae

Until 2017, these species were considered part of the family Emberizidae. Most of the species are known as sparrows, but these birds are not closely related to the Old World sparrows which are in the family Passeridae. Many of these have distinctive head patterns. Twenty-nine species have been recorded in Michigan.

- American tree sparrow, Spizelloides arborea
- Bachman's sparrow, Peucaea aestivalis (A)
- Black-throated sparrow, Amphispiza bilineata (A)
- Brewer's sparrow, Spizella breweri (A)
- Cassin's sparrow, Peucaea cassieucanii (A)
- Chipping sparrow, Spizella passerina
- Clay-colored sparrow, Spizella pallida
- Dark-eyed junco, Junco hyemalis
- Eastern towhee, Pipilo erythrophthalmus
- Field sparrow, Spizella pusilla
- Fox sparrow, Passerella iliaca
- Golden-crowned sparrow, Zonotrichia atricapilla (C)
- Grasshopper sparrow, Ammodramus savannarum
- Green-tailed towhee, Pipilo chlorurus (C)
- Harris's sparrow, Zonotrichia querula
- Henslow's sparrow, Centronyx henslowii
- Lark bunting, Calamospiza melanocorys (C)
- Lark sparrow, Chondestes grammacus
- LeConte's sparrow, Ammospiza leconteii
- Lincoln's sparrow, Melospiza lincolnii
- Nelson's sparrow, Ammospiza nelsoni
- Sagebrush sparrow, Artemisiospiza nevadensis (A)
- Savannah sparrow, Passerculus sandwichensis
- Song sparrow, Melospiza melodia
- Spotted towhee, Pipilo maculatus (C)
- Swamp sparrow, Melospiza georgiana
- Vesper sparrow, Pooecetes gramineus
- White-crowned sparrow, Zonotrichia leucophrys
- White-throated sparrow, Zonotrichia albicollis

== Yellow-breasted chat ==
Order: Passeriformes Family: Icteriidae

This species was historically placed in the wood-warblers (Parulidae) but nonetheless most authorities were unsure if it belonged there. It was placed in its own family in 2017.

- Yellow-breasted chat, Icteria virens

== Troupials and allies ==
Order: Passeriformes Family: Icteridae

The icterids are a group of small to medium-sized, often colorful passerine birds restricted to the New World and include the grackles, New World blackbirds, and New World orioles. Most species have black as a predominant plumage color, often enlivened by yellow, orange, or red. Fifteen species have been recorded in Michigan.

- Baltimore oriole, Icterus galbula
- Boat-tailed grackle/great-tailed grackle, Quiscalus major/Quiscalus mexicanus (A) (sight records only)
- Bobolink, Dolichonyx oryzivorus
- Brewer's blackbird, Euphagus cyanocephalus
- Brown-headed cowbird, Molothrus ater
- Bullock's oriole, Icterus bullockii (C)
- Common grackle, Quiscalus quiscula
- Eastern meadowlark, Sturnella magna
- Hooded oriole, Icterus cucullatus (A)
- Orchard oriole, Icterus spurius
- Red-winged blackbird, Agelaius phoeniceus
- Rusty blackbird, Euphagus carolinus
- Shiny cowbird, Molothrus bonariensis (A)
- Western meadowlark, Sturnella neglecta
- Yellow-headed blackbird, Xanthocephalus xanthocephalus

== New World warblers ==
Order: Passeriformes Family: Parulidae

The wood-warblers are a group of small often colorful passerine birds restricted to the New World. Most are arboreal, but some like the ovenbird and the two waterthrushes, are more terrestrial. Most members of this family are insectivores. Forty-two species have been recorded in Michigan.

- American redstart, Setophaga ruticilla
- Bay-breasted warbler, Setophaga castanea
- Black-and-white warbler, Mniotilta varia
- Blackburnian warbler, Setophaga fusca
- Blackpoll warbler, Setophaga striata
- Black-throated blue warbler, Setophaga caerulescens
- Black-throated gray warbler, Setophaga nigrescens (C)
- Black-throated green warbler, Setophaga virens
- Blue-winged warbler, Vermivora cyanoptera
- Canada warbler, Cardellina canadensis
- Cape May warbler, Setophaga tigrina
- Cerulean warbler, Setophaga cerulea
- Chestnut-sided warbler, Setophaga pensylvanica
- Common yellowthroat, Geothlypis trichas
- Connecticut warbler, Oporornis agilis
- Golden-winged warbler, Vermivora chrysoptera
- Hooded warbler, Setophaga citrina
- Kentucky warbler, Geothlypis formosa
- Kirtland's warbler, Setophaga kirtlandii
- Louisiana waterthrush, Parkesia motacilla
- Lucy's warbler, Leiothlypis luciae (A)
- Magnolia warbler, Setophaga magnolia
- Mourning warbler, Geothlypis philadelphia
- Nashville warbler, Leiothlypis ruficapilla
- Northern parula, Setophaga americana
- Northern waterthrush, Parkesia noveboracensis
- Orange-crowned warbler, Leiothlypis celata
- Ovenbird, Seiurus aurocapilla
- Painted redstart, Myioborus pictus (A)
- Palm warbler, Setophaga palmarum
- Pine warbler, Setophaga pinus
- Prairie warbler, Setophaga discolor
- Prothonotary warbler, Protonotaria citrea
- Swainson's warbler, Limnothlypis swainsonii (A)
- Tennessee warbler, Leiothlypis peregrina
- Townsend's warbler, Setophaga townsendi (A) (sight record only)
- Virginia's warbler, Leiothlypis virginiae (A)
- Wilson's warbler, Cardellina pusilla
- Worm-eating warbler, Helmitheros vermivorus
- Yellow warbler, Setophaga petechia
- Yellow-rumped warbler, Setophaga coronata
- Yellow-throated warbler, Setophaga dominica

== Cardinals and allies ==
Order: Passeriformes Family: Cardinalidae

The cardinals are a family of robust seed-eating birds with strong bills. They are typically associated with open woodland. The sexes usually have distinct plumages. Twelve species have been recorded in Michigan.

- Black-headed grosbeak, Pheucticus melanocephalus (A)
- Blue grosbeak, Passerina caerulea
- Dickcissel, Spiza americana
- Hepatic tanager, Piranga flava (A)
- Indigo bunting, Passerina cyanea
- Lazuli bunting, Passerina amoena (A)
- Northern cardinal, Cardinalis cardinalis
- Painted bunting, Passerina ciris
- Rose-breasted grosbeak, Pheucticus ludovicianus
- Scarlet tanager, Piranga olivacea
- Summer tanager, Piranga rubra
- Western tanager, Piranga ludoviciana (C)

== See also ==
- List of birds
- Lists of birds by region
- List of birds of North America
- List of birds of Isle Royale National Park
