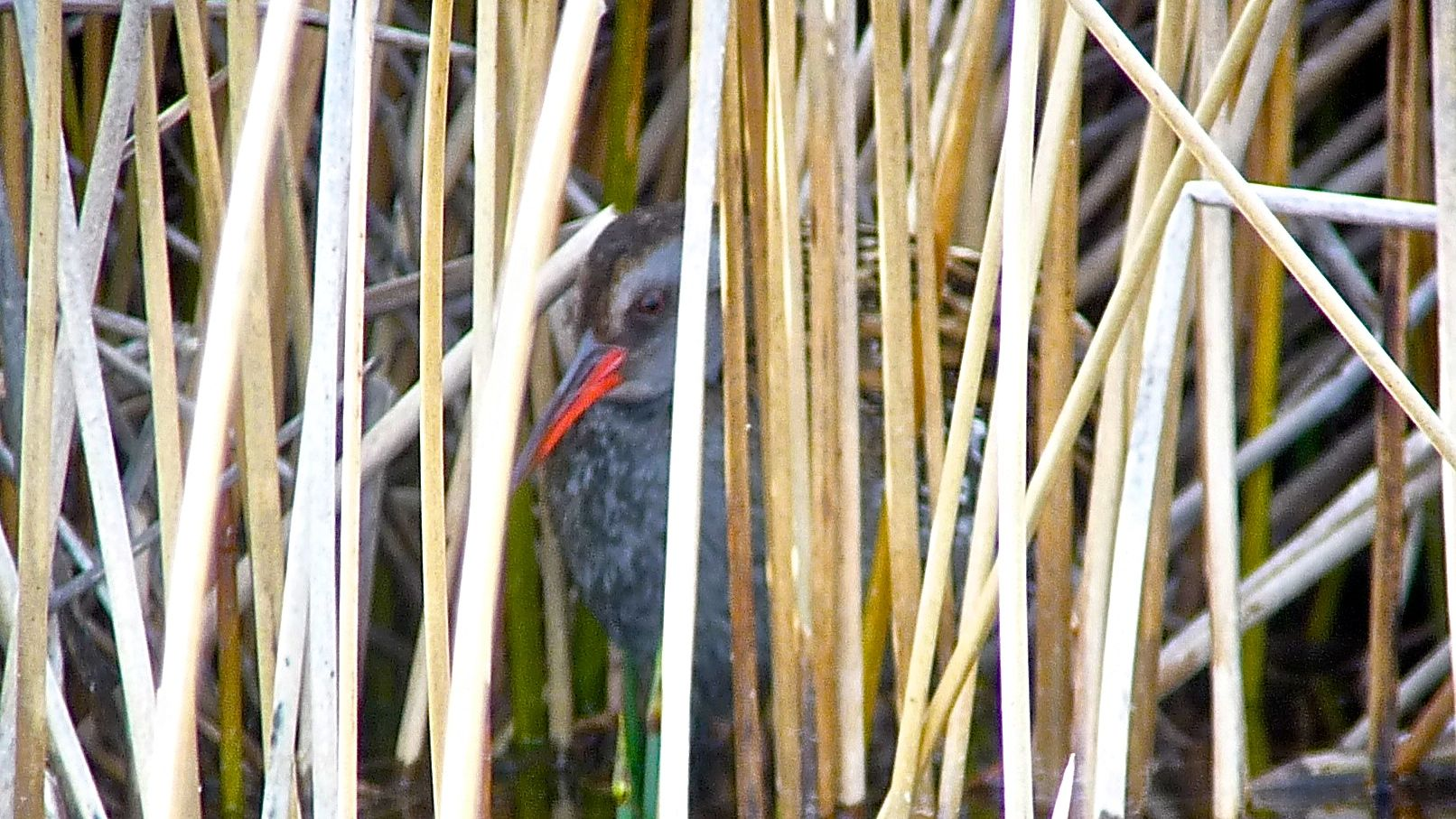

Conservation status
- Vulnerable (IUCN 3.1)

Scientific classification
- Kingdom: Animalia
- Phylum: Chordata
- Class: Aves
- Order: Gruiformes
- Family: Rallidae
- Genus: Rallus
- Species: R. antarcticus

Binomial name
- Rallus antarcticus King, 1828

= Austral rail =

Species of bird

The austral rail (Rallus antarcticus) is a Vulnerable species of bird in subfamily Rallinae of family Rallidae, the rails, gallinules, and coots. It is found in Argentina and Chile.

== Taxonomy and systematics ==
Some authors have considered the austral rail as conspecific with the Virginia rail (R. limicola) but their treatment has not been widely accepted. The species is monotypic.

== Description ==
The austral rail is about 20 cm (7.9 in) long. Adults have dull brown upperparts with buff-edged black centers to the back feathers. Their face and throat are gray, their breast olive brown, and their flanks barred with black and white. Juveniles are similar with the addition of sooty tips on the breast feathers and a white throat.

== Distribution and habitat ==
The austral rail is patchily distributed in southern Chile's Magallanes Region and in southern Argentina between the departments of Río Negro and Santa Cruz. It formerly occurred as far north as Santiago, Chile, and Buenos Aires, Argentina. It has also been recorded as a vagrant on the Falkland Islands. It is found mostly near the coast where it inhabits wet fields and meadows, rushy lake shores, and reedbeds.

== Behavior ==
=== Movement ===
Some of the southernmost populations appear to move north during the austral autumn.

=== Feeding ===
Little is known about the austral rail's foraging behavior and diet. Both are assumed to be similar to that of the Ecuadorian rail (R. aequatorialis), which has an eclectic diet.

=== Breeding ===
The austral rail's breeding biology is almost unknown. It appears to breed during October and November in Chile and November in Argentina. What is thought to be its nest was on the ground under a bramble; it was a depression in the ground lined with grass and rushes and held eight eggs.

=== Vocalization ===
The austral rail's main vocalization is "a series of high-pitched notes 'pee', 'peeree', 'peek' etc." which is often given in duet. It also makes "low booming sounds or grunts" and "a rather drawn-out single squeal."

== Status ==
The IUCN originally assessed the austral rail in 1988 as Threatened, then in 1994 as Critically Endangered, and since 2000 as Vulnerable. There were no documented records between 1959 and 1998 and is currently known from a limited number of locations. It has an estimated population of between 2500 and 10,000 mature individuals though the number might be as low as 1000, and the population is believed to be declining. The principal threat is grazing in its habitat but water diversion and introduced American mink (Neogale vison) also contribute to its decline. It is found in five formally protected areas and some de facto protected private lands.
