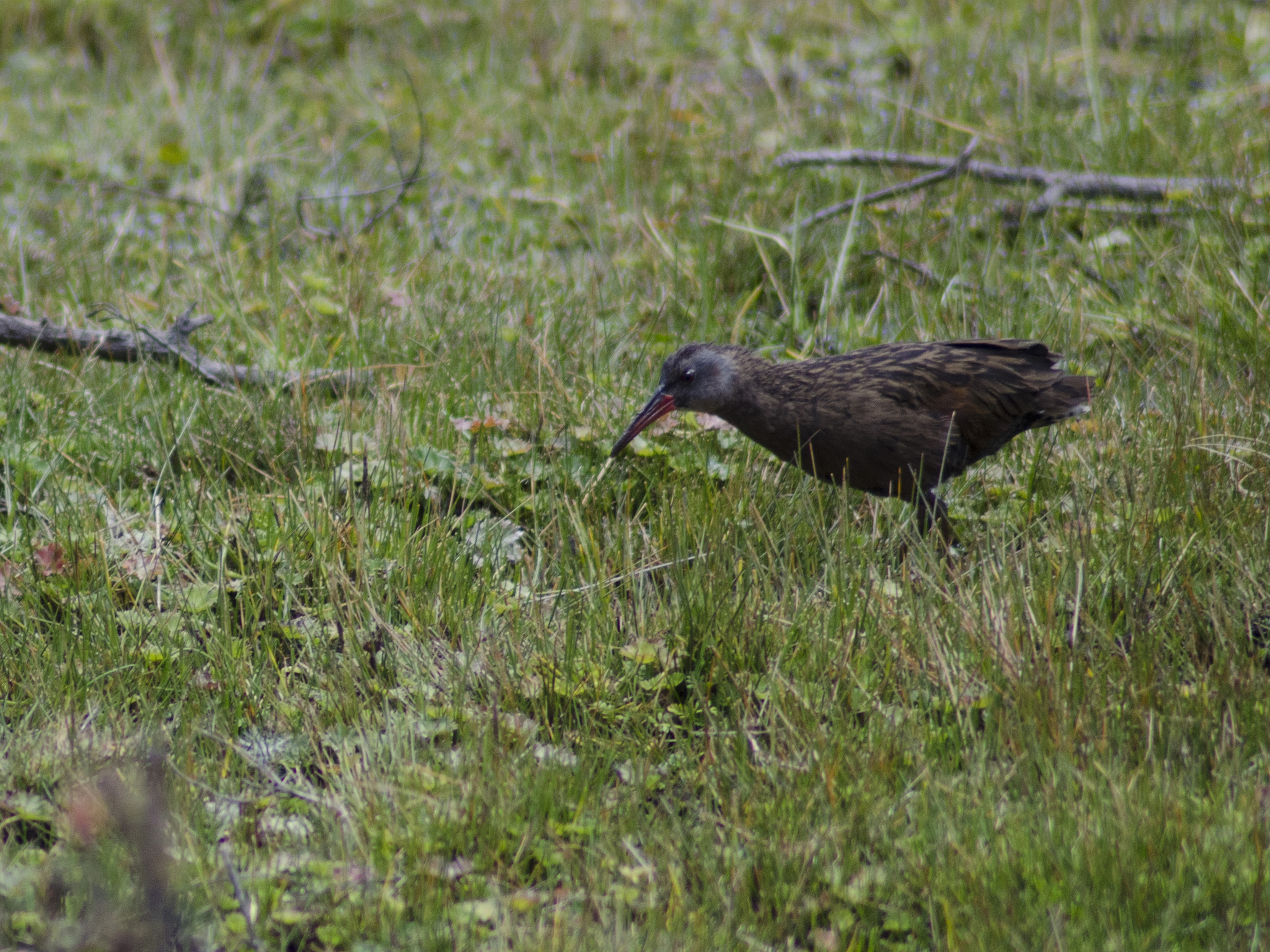

Scientific classification
- Kingdom: Animalia
- Phylum: Chordata
- Class: Aves
- Order: Gruiformes
- Family: Rallidae
- Genus: Rallus
- Species: R. aequatorialis

Binomial name
- Rallus aequatorialis Sharpe, 1894

Synonyms
- Rallus limicola aequatorialis

Audio

= Ecuadorian rail =

Species of bird

The Ecuadorian rail (Rallus aequatorialis) is a species of bird according to the International Ornithological Committee (IOC), AOS, and Clements checklist, but other taxonomic systems treat it as a subspecies of the Virginia rail (R. limicola). It is in subfamily Rallinae of family Rallidae, the rails, gallinules, and coots. It is found in Colombia, Ecuador, and Peru.

== Taxonomy and systematics ==
The IOC treats the Ecuadorian rail as a separate species with two subspecies. They base this treatment on Ridgely & Greenfield (2001). However, the South American Classification Committee of the American Ornithological Society, the Clements taxonomy, and BirdLife International's Handbook of the Birds of the World (HBW) treat those two taxa as subspecies of the Virginia rail.

=== Subspecies ===
- R. a. aequatorialis Sharpe, 1894 (nominate)
- R. a. meyerdeschauenseei Fjeldså, 1990

== Description ==
The Ecuadorian rail is 20 to 21 cm (7.9 to 8.3 in) long and weighs about 85 g (3.0 oz). The sexes are alike. Adults have a long, slightly decurved, bill that is reddish brown with a bright orange base. Their legs are dull orange. They have brown upperparts with blackish streaking and much rufous on the wing coverts. Their face and the sides of the neck are bluish gray and their throat white. Their underparts are dull cinnamon-buff with black and white barring on the flanks.

== Distribution and habitat ==
The Ecuadorian rail is found in the Andes from extreme southern Colombia to southern Ecuador and coastally in Peru between the departments of La Libertad and Arequipa. It inhabits marshes and wet grasslands at elevations up to about 3,800 m (12,500 ft). When migrating it uses flooded grasses.

== Behavior ==
=== Feeding ===
The Ecuadorian rail mostly forages in vegetation but sometimes ventures slightly into more open areas early in the morning. Its diet has not been determined separately from that of the Virginia rail sensu lato. That species has an eclectic diet that includes adult and larval aquatic invertebrates of many kinds, amphibians, and plant material.

=== Breeding ===
Hatchlings are covered in black down.

=== Vocalization ===
As of late 2022, xeno-canto had no recordings of Ecuadorian rail vocalizations and the Cornell Lab of Ornithology's Macaulay Library had 10. Its calls are described as "a descending series of squeals and grunts" with a higher pitch than those of the Virginia rail.

== Status ==
Its conservation status is not formally assessed, but the Ecuadorian rail is likely not globally threatened.
