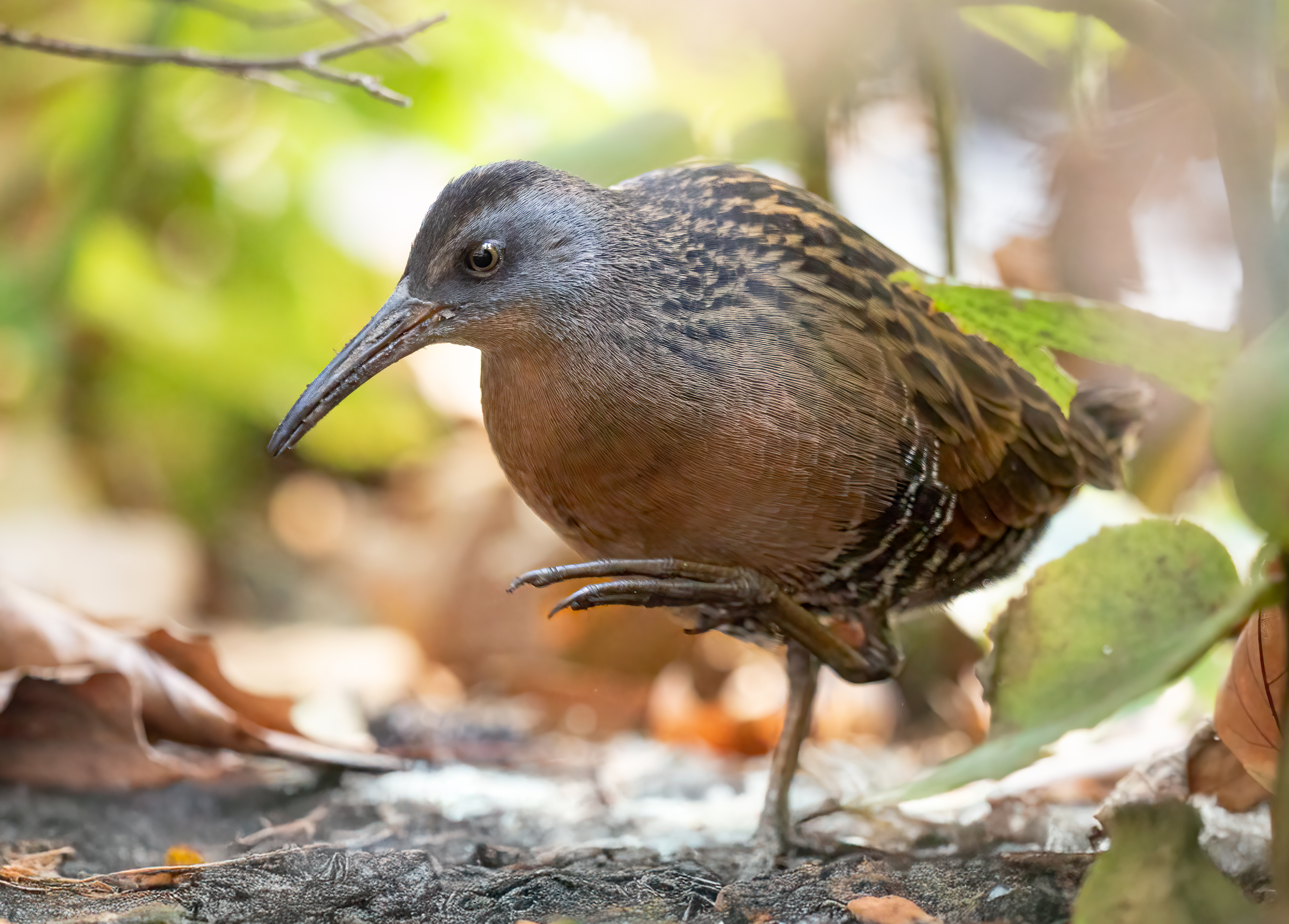
- In New York City

Conservation status
- Least Concern (IUCN 3.1)

Scientific classification
- Kingdom: Animalia
- Phylum: Chordata
- Class: Aves
- Order: Gruiformes
- Family: Rallidae
- Genus: Rallus
- Species: R. limicola

Binomial name
- Rallus limicola Vieillot, 1819
- Breeding Year-round Nonbreeding

= Virginia rail =

Species of bird

The Virginia rail (Rallus limicola) is a small waterbird, of the family Rallidae. These birds remain fairly common despite continuing loss of habitat, but are secretive by nature and more often heard than seen. They are also considered a game species in some provinces and states, though rarely hunted. The Ecuadorian rail is often considered a subspecies, but some taxonomic authorities consider it distinct.

== Description ==
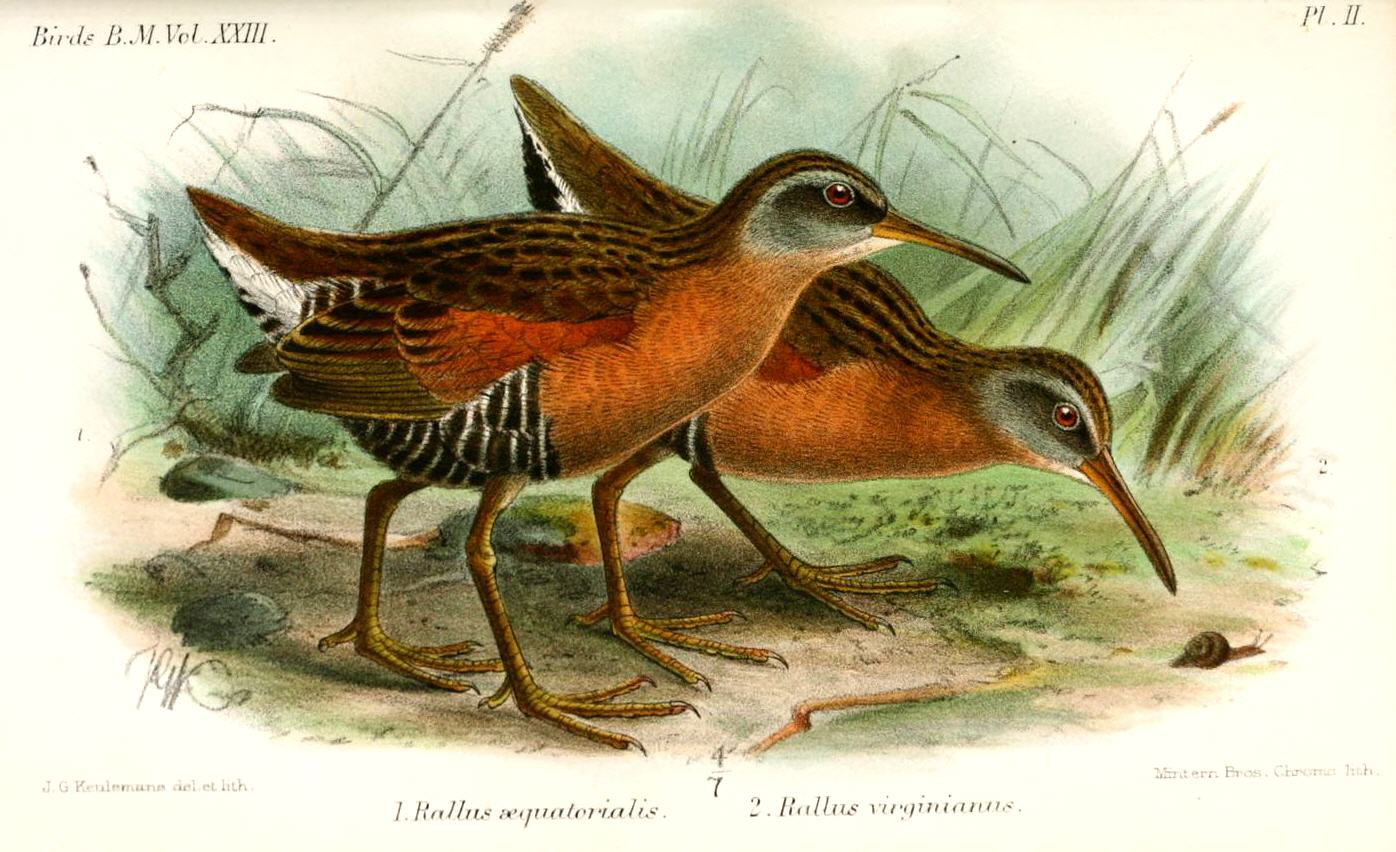
R. l. aequatorialis (left) and nominate (right)

Adults are mainly brown, darker on the back and crown, with orange-brown legs. To walk through dense vegetation, they have evolved a laterally compressed body and strong forehead feathers adapted to withstand wear from pushing through vegetation. Rails have the highest ratio of leg-muscle to flight-muscle of all birds (25% - 15% of body weight respectively). They have long toes used to walk on floating vegetation. Their tail is short and they have a long slim reddish bill. Their cheeks are grey, with a light stripe over the eye and a whitish throat. Chicks are black. Juveniles are blackish brown on upperparts with rufous on the edge of feathers and brownish bill and legs. Their underparts are dark brown to black, while the face is grayish brown. Both sexes are very similar, with females being slightly smaller. Adults measure 20–27 cm (7.9–10.6 in) in total length, and weigh about 85 g (3.0 oz) on average. Its wingspan is 32–38 cm (13–15 in).

== Taxonomy ==
The Virginia rail is in the genus Rallus, a genus of other long-billed rails. It is thought to be closely related to R. semiplumbeus and R. antarcticus. There are currently two recognized subspecies of Rallus limicola, although often only one subspecies is recognized:

- R. l. limicola Vieillot, 1819
- R. l. friedmanni Dickerman, 1966

The Virginia rail has been considered conspecific with the Ecuadorian rail.

== Habitat and distribution ==
The Virginia rail lives in freshwater and brackish marshes, sometimes salt marshes in winter. Northern populations migrate to the southern United States and Central America. On the Pacific coast, some are permanent residents. Its breeding habitat is marshes from Nova Scotia to Southern British Columbia, California and North Carolina, and in Central America.

== Behavior ==
=== Movement ===
The Virginia rail is capable of diving and swimming underwater, but likely only does so to escape predation. It occasionally climbs up plants and shrubs while foraging, rarely using the claw at the tip of its wing. It rarely flies except during migration.

=== Vocalizations ===
Adults have four primary calls. They also have several low-pitched and quiet calls used around its nest and directed toward the brood.

=== Diet ===
The Virginia rail probes with its bill in mud or shallow water. It primarily feeds on insects, worms, and other invertebrates. During the breeding season it primarily feeds on animals. During non-breeding, seeds and aquatic plants are more common in its diet.

=== Reproduction ===
Courtship starts around May. The male will raise his wings and run back and forth next to the female. Both sexes bow, and the male feeds the female. Before copulation, the male approaches the female while grunting. Virginia rails are monogamous. Both parents build the nest and care for the young, whereas only the male defends the territory. The nest is built as the first egg is laid and consists of a basket of woven vegetation. The nest is made using plants like cattails, reeds and grasses. They also build dummy nests around the marsh. They nest near the base of emergent vegetation in areas with vegetation creating a canopy above the nest.

This birds lays a clutch of 4 to 13 white or buff eggs with sparse gray or brown spotting. The eggs generally measure 32 by 24 millimetres (1.26 by 0.94 in), and weight about 9 g (0.32 oz). They are incubated by both parents for a period of 20 to 22 days, in which the parents continue to add nesting material to conceal the nest. They can carry eggs in their bill to move the clutch to an alternate nest. Chicks hatch precocial, and can walk almost immediately and swim once dry. They can fly at 4–7 weeks of age. Chicks are brooded by their parents for their first four to seven days, with it becoming less common in their second week. Its parents feed the chick after hatching, which becomes capable of foraging for itself after 7 days. The chicks leave their nest within three to four days, but its parents will continue to defend them after this. Young may become independent when they learn to fly; in captivity, aggressive interaction between young and parents was observed at 4–8 weeks of age.
