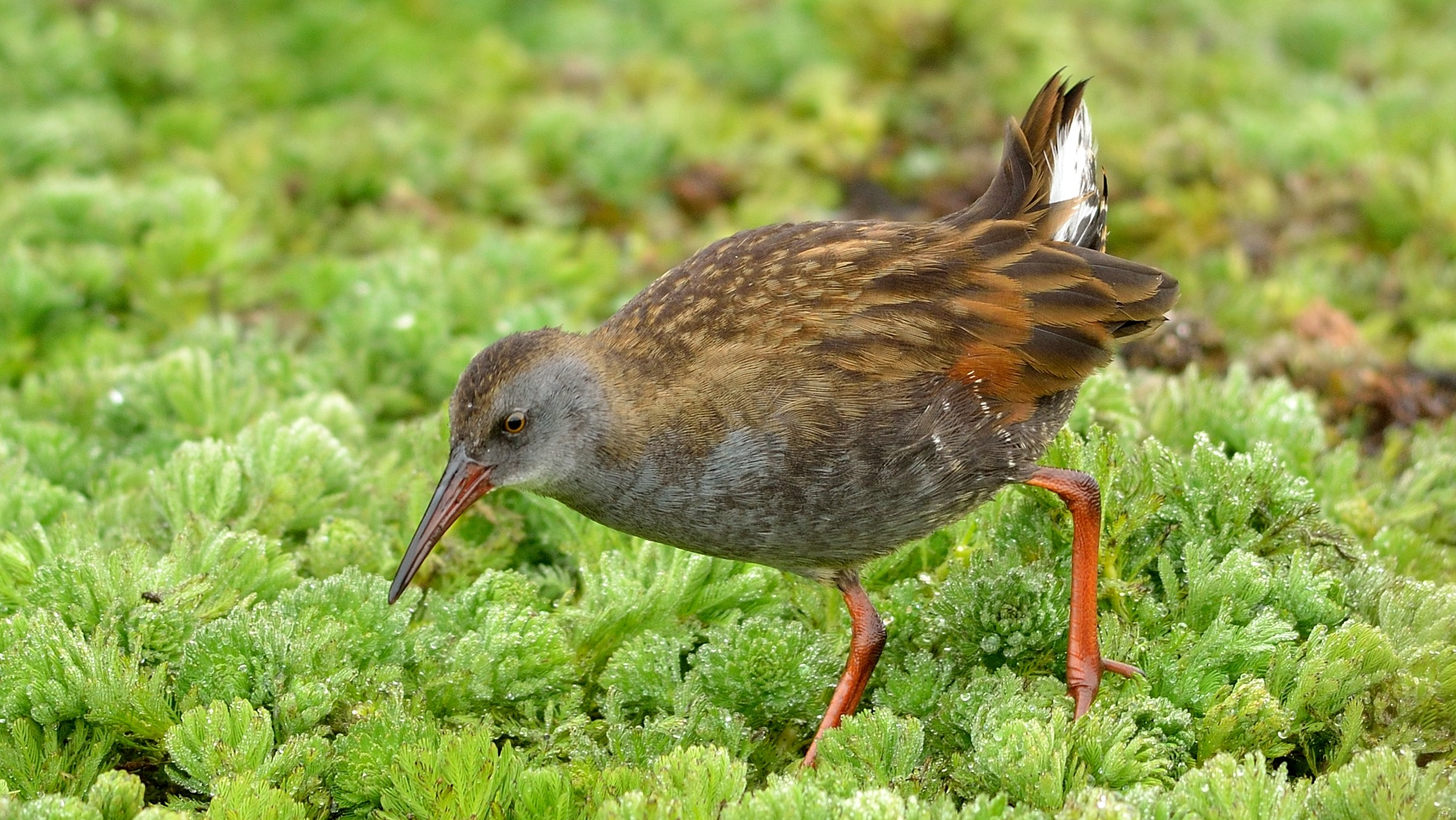

Conservation status
- Vulnerable (IUCN 3.1)

Scientific classification
- Kingdom: Animalia
- Phylum: Chordata
- Class: Aves
- Order: Gruiformes
- Family: Rallidae
- Genus: Rallus
- Species: R. semiplumbeus

Binomial name
- Rallus semiplumbeus Sclater, PL, 1856

= Bogotá rail =

Species of bird

The Bogotá rail (Rallus semiplumbeus) is a Vulnerable species of bird in subfamily Rallinae of family Rallidae, the rails, gallinules, and coots. It is endemic to Colombia. The bird is a typical medium-sized rail with a plump body that is laterally compressed ("skinny as a rail"), a short tail and an elongated bill.

== Taxonomy and systematics ==
The Bogotá rail was first described in 1856 by the American ornithologist Philip Sclater, based on a specimen sent to him by the French collectors Jules and Édouard Verreaux. The generic name Rallus is thought to derive from the name for these birds in French (Rale) or German (ralle). The specific epithet semiplumbeus comes from the Latin plumbum (lead), suggesting that the bird is somewhat the color of lead.

The Bogotá rail has two known subspecies:

- R. s. semiplumbeus (Sclater, 1856)
- R. s. peruvianus (Taczanowski, 1886)

R. s. peruvianus is known from a single specimen thought to have been collected in Peru; it is now considered to be extinct. Some authors have suggested that it represents a distinct species.

The taxonomic relationships among the Rallidae species are complex and not fully resolved, but phylogenetic analysis has determined that this species is one of eight members that form a clade (a monophyletic group). It is most closely related to the plain-flanked rail (R. wetmorei), mangrove rail (R. longirostris), Virginia rail (R. limicola), king rail (R. elegans), and austral rail (R. antarcticus) of the New World (Nearctic and Neotropical realms ), and the African rail (R. caerulescens), water rail (R. aquaticus), and brown-cheeked rail (R. indicus) of the Palearctic and Afrotropical realms.

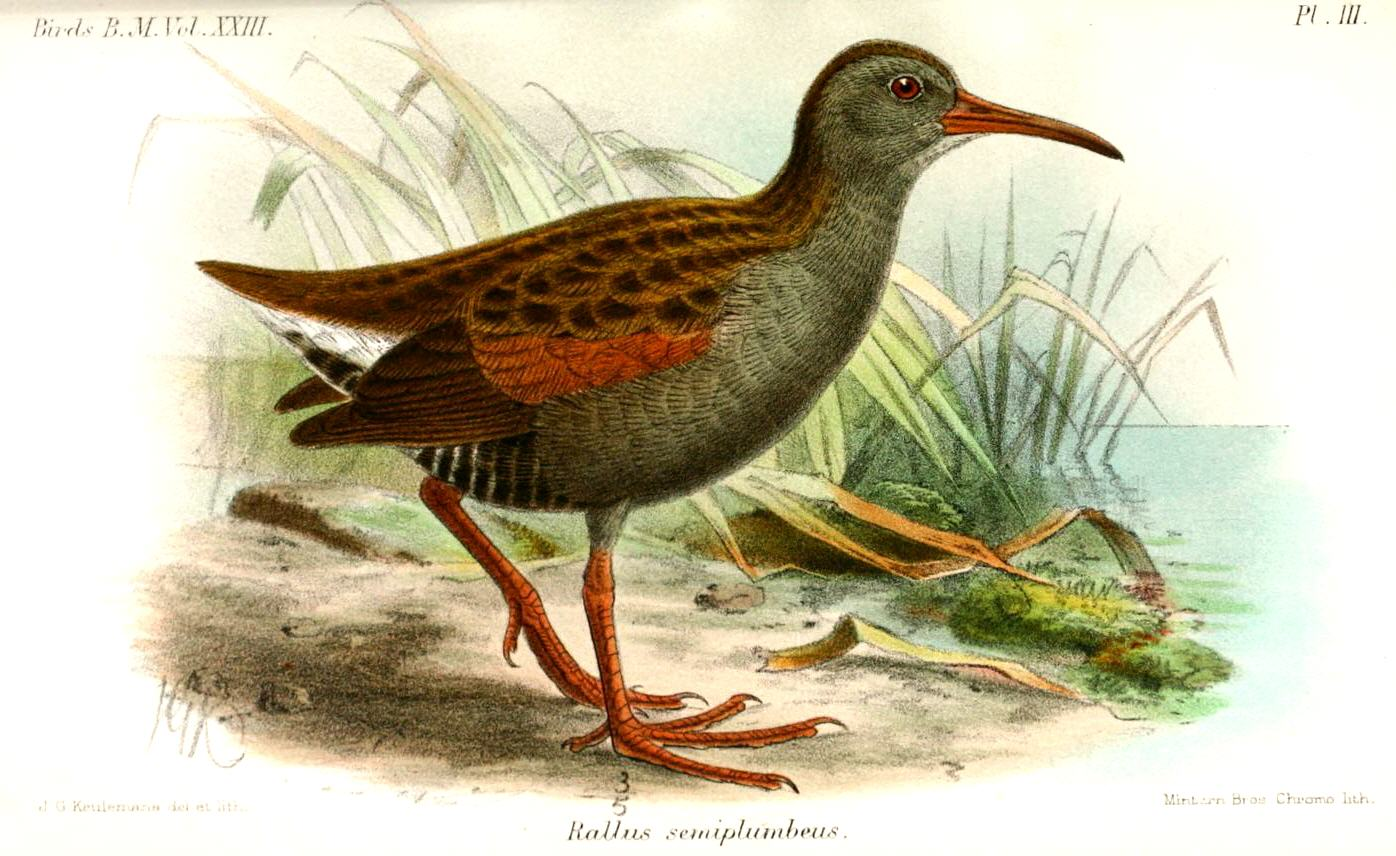

== Description ==
The Bogotá rail is a typical member of the genus Rallus, with a long and slightly decurved bill, a plump body, and a short tail. It is 25 to 30 cm (9.8 to 12 in) long. Its bill is dull red, shading to dusky black on the culmen and tip. Its eyes are red with a black pupil, and its legs are dull coral red. The sexes are alike. Adults have a sepia brown crown and nape and plumbeous gray face, breast, and belly. Their back, tertials, secondaries, and the upper side of the tail are dull brown, with black streaks on the back. Their primaries are black with chestnut fringing, and a rufous patch is usually evident on the wing coverts. The rear parts of their flanks are black with fine white vertical barring and their undertail coverts are white. There is a small patch of white on the throat just below the bill. Juveniles are similar to adults with the addition of sooty tips on the breast feathers and a whitish throat.

Standard Measurements
	Male	Female
Exposed culmen	43–45 mm (1.7–1.8 in)	37–41 mm (1.5–1.6 in)
Tarsus	38–44 mm (1.5–1.7 in)	35–44 mm (1.4–1.7 in)
Wing	105–117 mm (4.1–4.6 in)	98–110 mm (3.9–4.3 in)

== Distribution and habitat ==
The Bogotá rail is a scarce species endemic to the departments of Cundinamarca and Boyacá in the Eastern Andes of Colombia. It inhabits wetlands, ponds, and wet meadows on montane slopes and in the páramo, at elevations ranging from 2,000 to 4,100 m (6,600 to 13,500 ft) meters. The species is typically found in dense reedbeds dominated by the sedge Schoenoplectus californicus, but also including emergent vegetation such as Juncus effusus, Rumex obtusifolius, Bidens laevis, Hydrocotyle ranunculoides, and Carex acutata. Reedbeds bordered by dwarf Chusquea bamboo or other dense vegetation seem to be favored.

A study of Bogotá rails in the wetland of La Conejera found that they spent on average 84% of their time within this type of habitat. The birds were also observed in wet grasslands, although it seems that they mainly ventured into this more open (and predator-friendly) habitat while moving between patches of wetland. They were only occasionally seen on floating vegetation.

== Behavior ==
=== Movement ===
The Bogotá rail is a resident species.

=== Feeding ===
The Bogotá rail forages mostly at dawn and dusk. It seeks prey at the edges of reedbeds and marshes, in flooded grassy areas, in shallow water with floating plants, and among waterlogged dead vegetation. Its diet is principally aquatic invertebrates including insect larvae, and also includes worms, molluscs, amphibians, and plant material.

=== Breeding ===
The Bogotá rail's breeding period is not well defined but appears to span from July to September. It is thought to be monogamous and territorial. Its clutch size is roughly seven to nine eggs, which are incubated for 19 days. both parents care for the young.

=== Vocalization ===
The Bogotá rail calls only in daytime. Its vocalizations include "squeaks, grunts, and whistling and piping notes" that increase in volume and fairly abruptly end. When disturbed it also makes a "brief, rapid 'titititirr'."

== Status ==
The IUCN originally assessed the Bogotá rail as Threatened and then in 1994 as Endangered. In 2021 it was reclassified as Vulnerable. It has a very small range, and its estimated population of 3700 mature individuals is believed to be decreasing. Its wetland habitat is under severe human pressure. "Drainage has caused massive habitat loss on the Ubaté-Bogotá plateau, and few suitably vegetated marshes remain because of pollution and siltation." It is locally common and appears "able to survive in small patches of remaining habitat".
