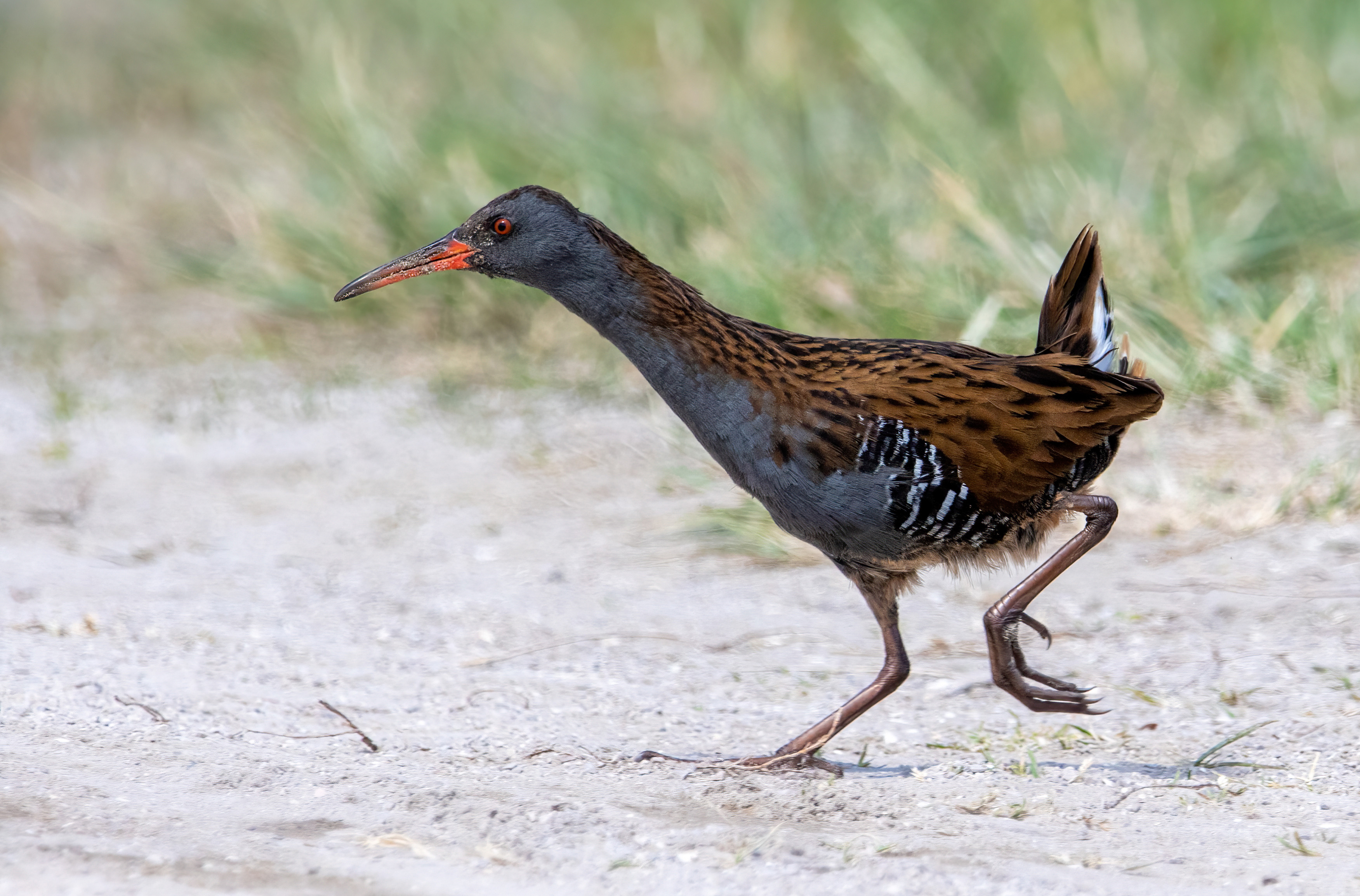

Conservation status
- Least Concern (IUCN 3.1)

Scientific classification
- Kingdom: Animalia
- Phylum: Chordata
- Class: Aves
- Order: Gruiformes
- Family: Rallidae
- Genus: Rallus
- Species: R. aquaticus

Binomial name
- Rallus aquaticus Linnaeus, 1758
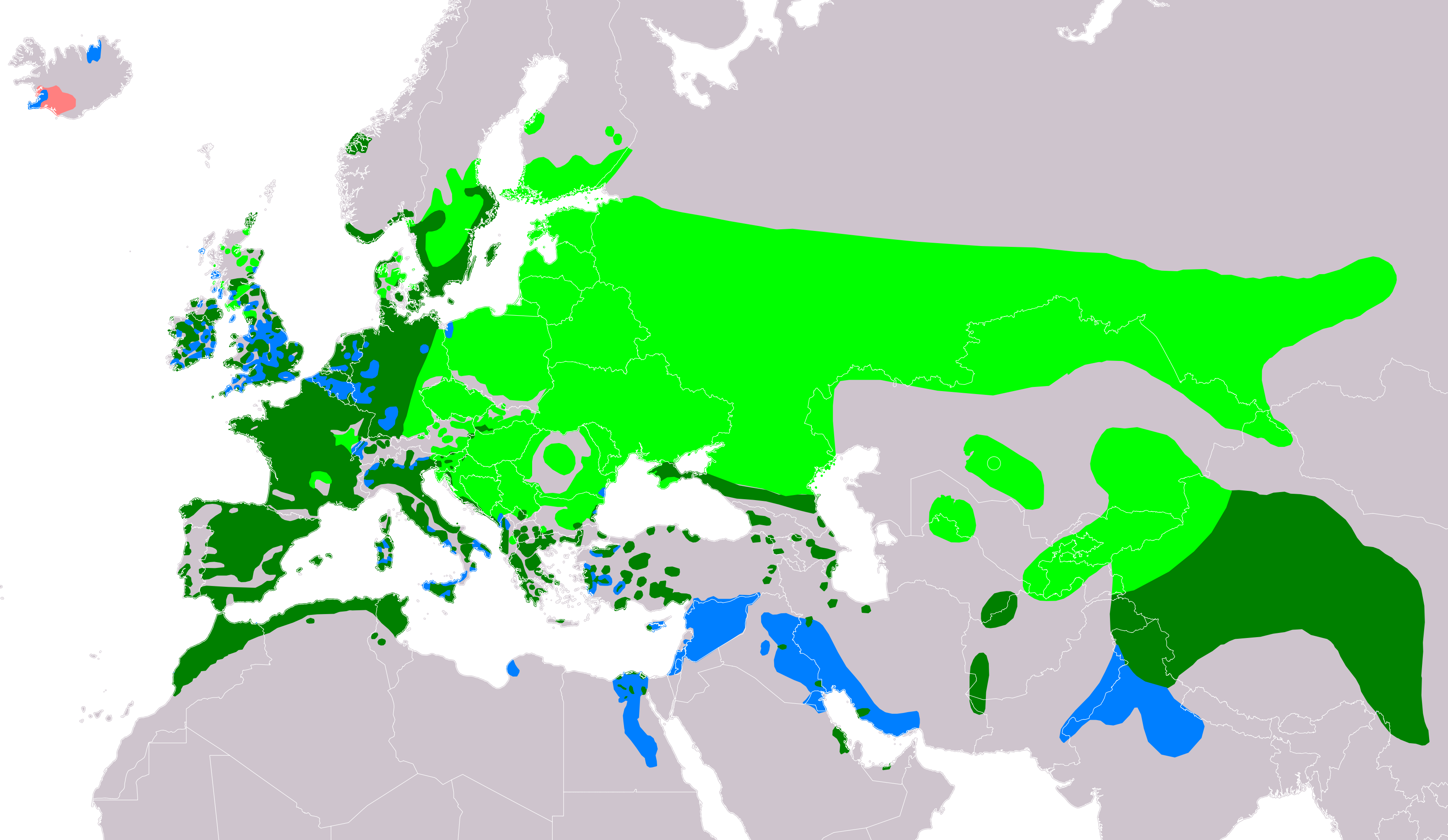
- Range of R. aquaticus Breeding Resident Non-breeding Probably extinct

= Water rail =

Species of bird

The water rail, western water rail or European water rail (Rallus aquaticus) is a bird of the rail family which breeds in well-vegetated wetlands across Europe, Asia and North Africa. Northern and eastern populations are migratory, but this species is a permanent resident in the warmer parts of its breeding range. The adult is 23–28 cm (9–11 in) long, and, like other rails, has a body that is flattened laterally, allowing it easier passage through the reed beds it inhabits. It has mainly brown upperparts and blue-grey underparts, black barring on the flanks, long toes, a short tail and a long reddish bill. Immature birds are generally similar in appearance to the adults, but the blue-grey in the plumage is replaced by buff. The downy chicks are black, as with all rails. The former subspecies R. indicus has distinctive markings and a call that is very different from the pig-like squeal of the western rails, and is now usually split as a separate species, the brown-cheeked rail.

The water rail breeds in reed beds and other marshy sites with tall, dense vegetation, building its nest a little above the water level from whatever plants are available nearby. The off-white, blotched eggs are incubated mainly by the female, and the precocial downy chicks hatch in 19–22 days. The female will defend her eggs and brood against intruders, or move them to another location if they are discovered. This species can breed after its first year, and it normally raises two clutches in each season. Water rails are omnivorous, feeding mainly on invertebrates during summer and berries or plant stems towards winter. They are territorial even after breeding, and will aggressively defend feeding areas in winter.

These rails are vulnerable to flooding or freezing conditions, loss of habitat and predation by mammals and large birds. The introduced American mink has exterminated some island populations, but overall the species' huge range and large numbers mean that it is not considered to be threatened.

== Taxonomy ==
The rails are a bird family comprising around 150 species. Although the origins of the group are lost in antiquity, the largest number of species and the most primitive forms are found in the Old World, suggesting that this family originated there. However, the genus Rallus, the group of long-billed reed bed specialists to which the water rail belongs, arose in the New World. Its Old World members, the water, African and Madagascar rails, form a superspecies, and are thought to have evolved from a single invasion from across the Atlantic. Genetic evidence suggests that the water rail is the most closely related of its genus to the Pacific Gallirallus rails, and is basal to that group. The water rail was first described by Carl Linnaeus in his 1758 10th edition of Systema Naturae under its current scientific name, Rallus aquaticus. The binomial name is the Latin equivalent of the English "water rail" that had been used by English ornithologists Francis Willughby in 1676 and by Eleazar Albin in 1731.

The former subspecies R. a. indicus has very different vocalisations from the water rail, and it was considered to be a separate species in early works. It was restored as a full species R. indicus, by Pamela Rasmussen in her Birds of South Asia (2005). Her treatment has gained acceptance, and is followed in Birds of Malaysia and Singapore (2010). A 2010 study of molecular phylogeny further supported the possibility of specific status for R. indicus, which is estimated to have diverged from the Western forms around 534,000 years ago.

=== Fossils ===
The oldest known fossils of an ancestral water rail are bones from Carpathia dated to the Pliocene (1.8-5.3 million years ago). By the late Pliocene, two million years ago, the fossil evidence suggests that the water rail was present across most of its present range. This species is well-recorded, with over 30 records from Bulgaria alone, and many others from across southern Europe. and China. A rail from Eivissa, Rallus eivissensis, was smaller but more robust than the water rail, and probably had poorer flight abilities. In the Quaternary, the island lacked terrestrial mammals, and this distinctive form presumably descended from its continental relative. It became extinct at about the same time as human arrival on the island, between 16,700 and 5,300 BC. The nominate race of water rail is now a very rare resident on Eivissa.

== Description ==
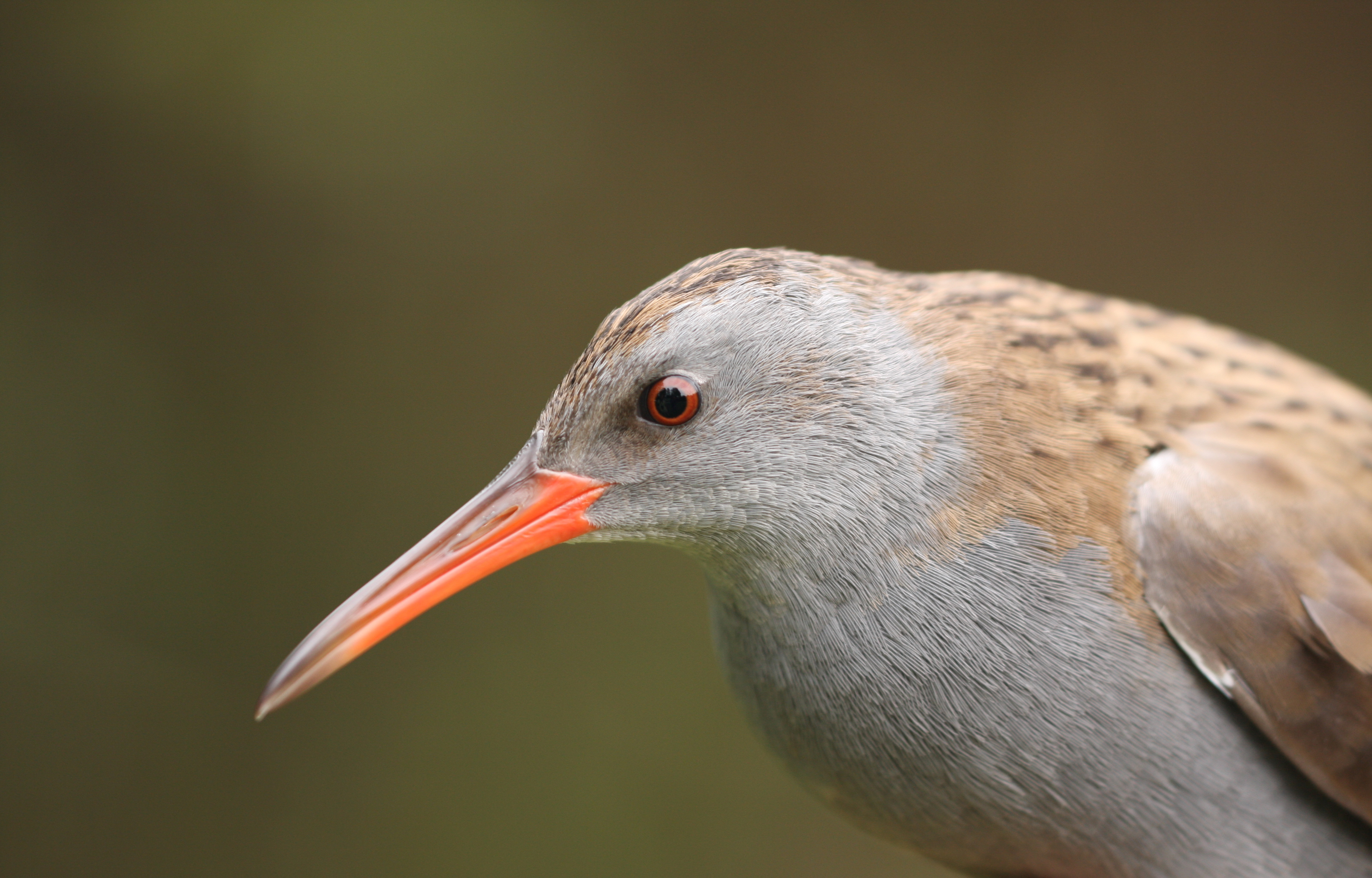
Head of the nominate subspecies, R. a. aquaticus

The adult of the nominate subspecies is a medium-sized rail, 23–28 cm (9.1–11.0 in) long with a 38–45 cm (15–18 in) wingspan. Males typically weigh 114–164 g (4.0–5.8 oz) and females are slightly lighter at 92–107 g (3.2–3.8 oz). The upper parts from the forehead to tail are olive-brown with black streaks, especially on the shoulders. The sides of the head and the underparts down to the upper belly are dark slate-blue, except for a blackish area between bill and eye, and brownish sides to the upper breast. The flanks are barred black and white, and the undertail is white with some darker streaks. The long bill and the iris are red, and the legs are flesh-brown. The sexes are similar; although the female averages slightly smaller than the male, with a more slender bill, determining sex through measurements alone is unreliable. The juvenile has a blackish crown and a white chin and throat. The underparts are buff or white with darker bars, and the flank markings are brown and buff, rather than black and white. The undertail is buff, and the eye, bill and leg colours are duller than the adult. The downy chick is all black apart from a mainly white bill. After breeding, the rail has an extensive moult, and is flightless for about three weeks. Individual adults can be identified by the markings on the undertail, which are unique to each bird. Adult males have the strongest black undertail streaks. It has been suggested that the dark barring on the undertail of this species is a compromise between the signalling function of a pure white undertail, as found in open water or gregarious species like the common moorhen, and the need to avoid being too conspicuous.

The water rail can readily be distinguished from most other reed bed rails by its white undertail and red bill; the latter is a little longer than the rest of the rail's head (55–58% of the total) and slightly down-curved. The somewhat similar slaty-breasted rail of tropical Asia has a stouter bill, a chestnut crown and white-spotted upperparts. Juvenile and freshly moulted water rails may show a buff undertail like spotted crake, but that species' plumage is spotted with white, and it has a much shorter, mainly yellowish bill. The range of the water rail does not overlap with that of any other Rallus species, but vagrants could be distinguished from their American relatives by the lack of rufous or chestnut on the closed wing. The larger African rail has unstreaked darker brown upperparts and brighter red legs and feet.

=== Vocalisations ===
The water rail is a vocal species which gives its main call, known as "sharming", throughout the year. This is a series of grunts followed by a high-pitched piglet-like squeal and ending in more grunts. It is used as a territorial call, alarm and announcement. Members of a pair may call alternately, the male giving lower and slower notes than his partner. The courtship song, given by both sexes, is a tyick-tyick-tyick often ending with a trill from the female; the male may sing for hours. The flight call is a sharp whistle, and other vocalizations include a loud repeated creak given by the male when showing the nest site to the female, and a purring given by both parents when at the nest with chicks. The rails are most vocal when setting up a territory and early in the breeding season, when calling may continue at night. Chicks initially cheep weakly, but soon develop a tyk-tyk-trik begging call.

When researchers played recordings of the reed warbler at night to attract that species for trapping, they found water rails and other wetland birds were also grounded, despite a lack of suitable habitat, suggesting that the rails and other nocturnal migrants recognised the warbler's song and associated it with the marshy habitat in which it is usually found.

=== Subspecies ===
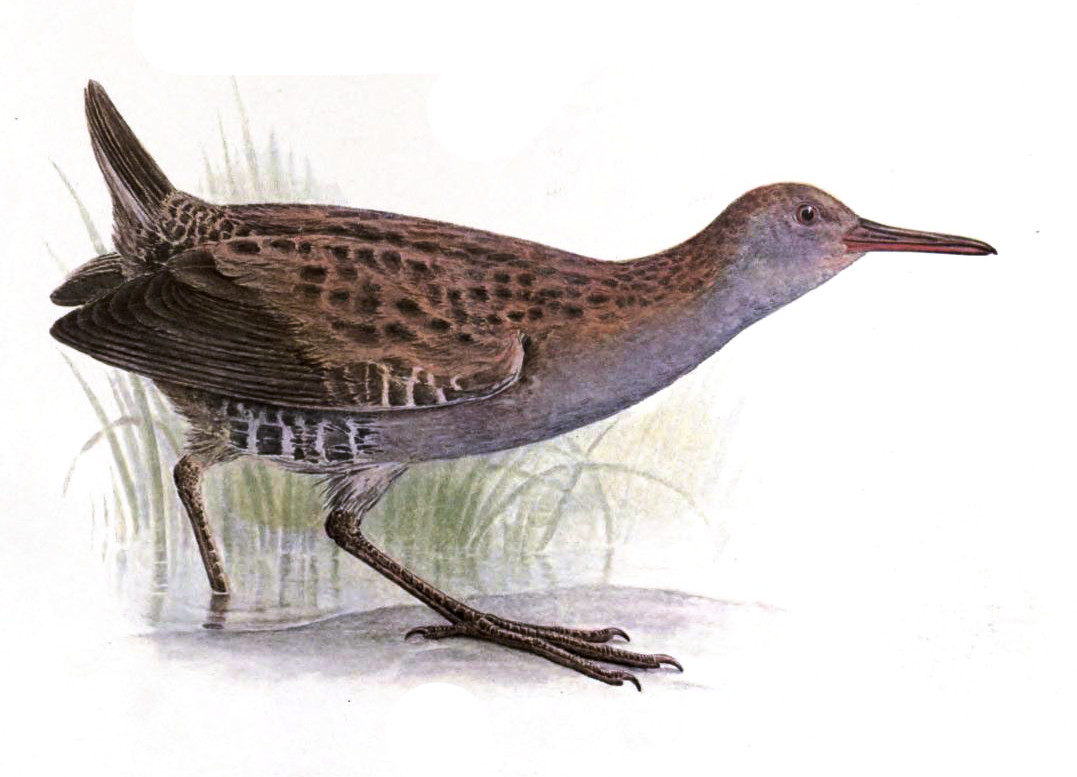
R. a. korejewi

There are three recognised subspecies.

- R. a. aquaticus Linnaeus, 1758. This is the nominate subspecies that breeds in Europe, North Africa, Turkey, western Asia to the Caspian Sea and western Kazakhstan, and in a narrow band east to central Siberia.
- R. a. hibernans Salomonsen, 1931. The Icelandic race, which has slightly warmer brown upperparts than the nominate form. The bars of the flanks are dark brown, not black, and the bill is somewhat shorter; the grey of the underparts may have a brown tinge.
- R. a. korejewi Zarudny, 1905. (includes the dubious forms deserticolor, tsaidamensis and arjanicus). This subspecies breeds in south central Asia from southern and eastern Iran east to Eastern China (Sometimes in Beijing, Shanghai etc.), and in the Indian subcontinent in Kashmir and Ladakh. It is slightly larger than the nominate race, with paler brown upperparts and slightly paler slate underparts. It has a weak brown stripe through the eye.

The differences between the three other races appear to be clinal, and it is possible that they should all be merged into R. a. aquaticus.

== Distribution and habitat ==
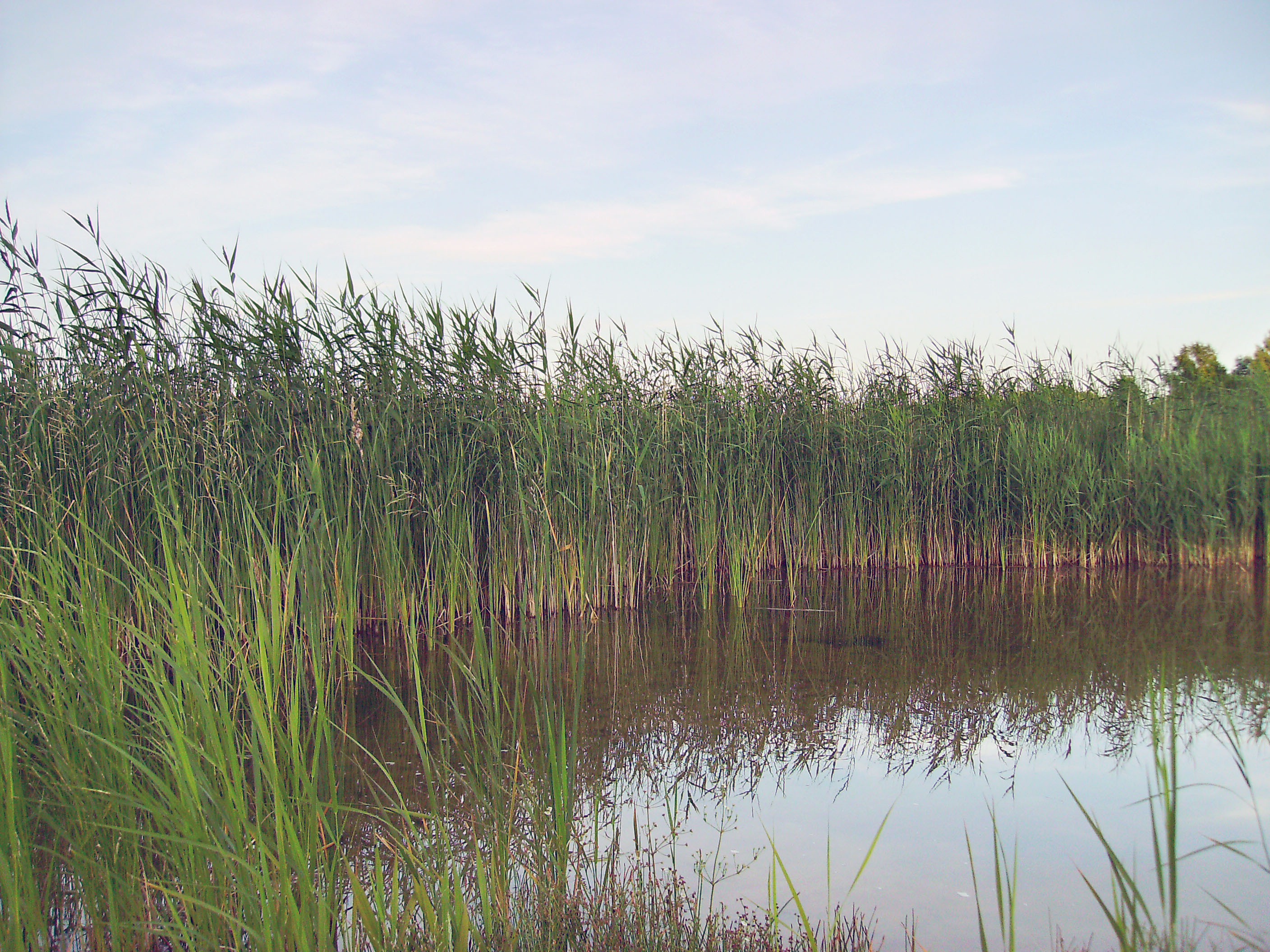
Common reed is an important habitat for breeding and wintering.

The water rail breeds across temperate Eurasia from Iceland and Ireland discontinuously to North Africa, Saudi Arabia and western China. Its distribution in Asia is poorly studied.

The Icelandic population of water rail, R. a. hibernans, became extinct around 1965, as a result of loss of habitat through the draining of wetlands, and predation by the introduced American mink.

Prior to its extinction, at least some birds were present year-round on the island, relying on warm volcanic springs to survive through the coldest months, but this race was also found in winter in the Faroe Islands and Ireland, and on passage through the Western Isles, suggesting that the Icelandic form was a partial migrant. The nominate subspecies, R. a. aquaticus is resident in the milder south and west of its range, but migrates south from areas that are subject to harsh winters. It winters within its breeding range, and also further south in North Africa, the Middle East and the Caspian Sea area. The peak migration period is September to October, with most birds returning to the breeding grounds from March to mid-April. A specimen of the nominate population labelled as "Baluchistan" and collected by Richard Meinertzhagen is considered of doubtful provenance. R. a. korejewi is another partial migrant, with some of the population wintering from Iraq and eastern Saudi Arabia eastwards through Pakistan and northern India to western China.

The breeding habitat of the water rail is permanent wetland with still or slow-moving fresh or brackish water and dense, tall vegetation, which may include common reed, reedmace, irises, bur-reed or sedges. In coastal areas, sea rush is common in saltmarsh breeding sites, with sedges and bur-reed dominant in somewhat less saline environments. A study in the Netherlands and Spain showed that the rush provided better concealment than the other maritime plants. As elsewhere, nests were constructed from the nearest available plants. Where it occurs, saw-sedge provides good breeding habitat, its tall (1.5 m (4.9 ft)) dense structure providing good cover for the nesting rails. The preferred habitat is Phragmites reedbed with the plants standing in water, with a depth of 5–30 cm (2.0–11.8 in), muddy areas for feeding and a rich diversity of invertebrate species. Locations with nearby willows or shrubs are favoured above large areas of uniform habitat. In addition to natural fresh or marine marshes, this rail may use gravel or clay excavations and peat workings as long as there is suitable habitat with good cover. It may be found in rice paddies or on floating islands, and it occurs in Kashmir in flooded sugarcane fields. A Finnish study showed that the main factor influencing the distribution of water rails was the extent of vegetation cover, with the highest densities in the most vegetated areas; the presence of other marshes nearby was also significant. However, factors such as temperature, rainfall, length of shore line and extent of peat, important for some other marsh birds, were not statistically relevant. The areas with the highest densities of the rail also had the greatest numbers of three species considered at risk in Finland, the great reed warbler, Eurasian bittern and marsh harrier. The northern limit of breeding seems to be determined by the transition from nutrient-rich wetland to poorer, more acidic water. This leads to the replacement of common reed by a more open vegetation type dominated by marsh cinquefoil, which is unsuitable for the rails.

Occasionally, more unusual locations are used. One pair in Scotland nested in the open by the side of a road, and when an English nature reserve installed nest boxes for bearded tits (reed "wigwams" with a wooden floor), rails nested both in the boxes and under the wooden floor, in the latter case sometimes with the tits in residence above. Although mainly a lowland species, the water rail breeds at 1,240 m (4,070 ft) in the Alps and 2,000 m (6,600 ft) in Armenia. An Italian study suggested that reed bed birds need a minimum area of wetland for breeding, which for the water rail is about 1 ha (2.5 acres), although the highest densities are in marshes of 10 ha (25 acres) or more.

On migration and in winter, a wider range of wet habitats may be used, including flooded thickets or bracken. Freezing condition may force birds into more open locations such as ditches, rubbish dumps and gardens, or even out onto exposed ice. A Welsh study suggested that individual winter territories overlap, with each bird using a significant proportion of the reed bed. After site desertion in freezing weather, birds return to their former range. A density of 14 birds per hectare (6.6 per acre) was recorded. Birds wintering in Iceland rely on warm geothermal streams, and may access streams through tunnels under the snow. When not feeding, they may shelter in holes and crevices in the solidified lava. This species sometimes wanders well outside its normal range and vagrants have been found in the Azores, Madeira, Mauritania, the Arctic, Greenland, Brunei, Malaysia and Sri Lanka.

== Behaviour ==
This rail is a skulking species, its streaked plumage making it difficult to see in its wetland habitat. Its laterally compressed body allows it to slip though the densest vegetation, and it will "freeze" if surprised in the open. It walks with a high-stepping gait, although it adopts a crouch when it runs for cover. It swims, when necessary, with the jerky motion typical of rails, and it flies short distances low over the reeds with its long legs dangling. Although their flight looks weak, water rails are capable of long sustained flights during their nocturnal migrations, and are sometimes killed in collisions with lighthouses or wires. British-ringed birds have been recovered from as far away as Poland, Czechoslovakia and Sweden.

This species defends its breeding and wintering territories. Birds will charge each other with neck outstretched when breeding, sometimes both members of a pair attacking together. Large strongly-marked males are dominant in winter, when the direct aggression is replaced by sharming while standing upright on tip-toe, head jerking and bill thrusting.

=== Breeding ===
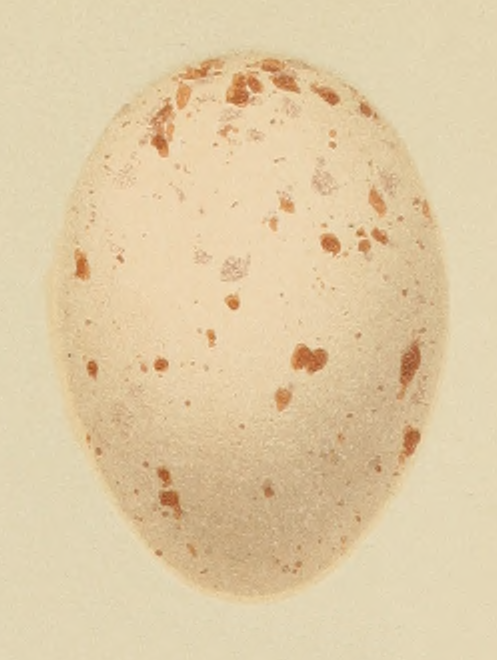
Egg

The water rail is socially monogamous and highly territorial when breeding. The birds pair off after arriving at their nesting areas, or possibly even before spring migration. In large wetlands with good conditions birds may nest 20–50 m (22–55 yd) apart. Territories vary in size, but 300 m^{2} (360 sq yd) is typical. The pair give courting and contact calls throughout the breeding season. The male selects the nest site which he shows to the female while posturing with raised back feathers, wings arched over his back, tail spread and bill pointed vertically downwards. This display is accompanied by a loud call. Before mating, he raises his wings and tail, and bows with his bill touching his breast. The male feeds the female during courtship, and, when incubating, she may leave the nest to display to the male, walking round him, calling softly, rubbing her bill against his and taking short runs to and from him.

While water rails are socially monogamous, a large proportion of birds engage in extra-pair copulation. Some water rails also engage in intraspecific brood parasitism, where a female lays her eggs in another female's nest, and quasi-parasitism, where a female mates with an already-paired male and lays her eggs the nest he is attending with another female.

The nest is made from whatever wetland vegetation is available and built mostly by the male, usually in a single day. It is raised 15 cm (5.9 in) or more above the level of the marsh, and is sometimes constructed on clumps of roots, tree stumps or similar support. It may be built up higher if the marsh waters start to rise. The nest is 13–16 cm (5.1–6.3 in) across and about 7 cm (2.8 in) high. It is well hidden and approached by narrow tracks.

The typical clutch is 6–11 eggs across most of the range, but appears to be smaller (5–8) in Kashmir at around 1,500 m (4,900 ft) altitude. Laying dates vary with location, from late March in Western Europe and North Africa, to late May in Kashmir and June in Iceland. The clutch size may be smaller early or late in the breeding season. The breeding season can be extended by replacement and second clutches. The eggs are blunt and oval, smooth and slightly glossy; the colour varies from off-white to pink-buff, with reddish-brown blotches mainly at the broader end that sometimes merging into a single patch. Variation in egg size across the four subspecies is much less than the differences between individual eggs; the average size of the eggs of the nominate subspecies, 36 mm × 26 mm (1.4 in × 1.0 in), is therefore typical for the species as a whole. The eggs weigh about 13 g (0.46 oz), of which 7% is shell.

Both parents incubate the eggs, although the female takes the larger share of this duty. The eggs are incubated for 19–22 days to hatching, with at least 87% success. Food is brought to the nest by the other adult and passed to the sitting parent who feeds the chicks. The precocial, downy young leave the nest within two days of hatching but continue to be fed by their parents, although the chicks also find some of their own food after about five days. They are independent of their parents after 20–30 days and can fly when aged 7–9 weeks. If a nest appears to have been discovered, the female may carry the chicks or eggs one by one to another location; the eggs are carried in the bill, but small chicks may be tucked under the wing. Sitting birds may stay on the eggs even when approached closely, attack the intruder, or feign injury as a distraction. The water rail can breed after its first year, and it normally raises two broods.

Average survival after fledging has been estimated as between 17 and 20 months, with an annual survival rate slightly less than 50% per year for the first three years, and somewhat higher thereafter. The maximum recorded age is 8 years 10 months.

=== Feeding ===
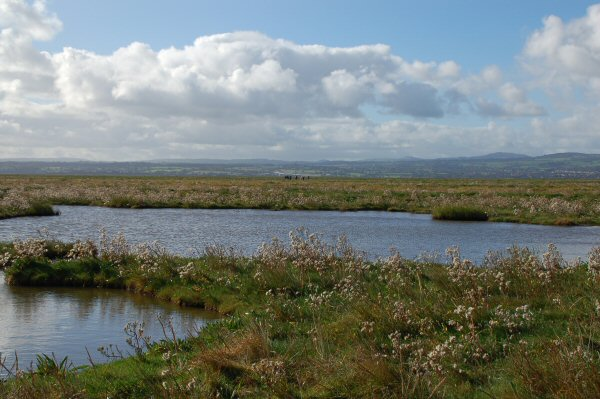
The marshes at Parkgate, Cheshire may hold hundreds of water rails in winter.

Water rails are omnivorous, although they mainly feed on animals. These include leeches, worms, gastropods, small crustaceans, spiders, and a wide range of both terrestrial and aquatic insects and their larvae. Small vertebrates such as amphibians, fish, birds and mammals may be killed or eaten as carrion. Vertebrates are impaled with a strike of the bill which breaks the prey's spinal cord. Plant food, which is consumed more in autumn and winter, includes the buds, flowers, shoots and seeds of water plants, berries and fruit. In south Asia, paddy (harvested rice kernels) may sometimes be eaten. The young rails are fed mainly on insects and spiders. Food obtained on land or from mud is normally washed in water before it is eaten. After rain, rails may probe soft ground for earthworms. This species will occasionally feed in the open even when not forced to do so by cold weather; Edmund Meade-Waldo described seven rails feeding in an open meadow. Despite its skulking nature, the water rail appears to thrive in captivity when fed on animal food such as raw meat or earthworms; one individual was taught to jump for worms suspended from a fishing rod.

Water rails follow definite routes when feeding, frequently returning to good hunting areas. These rails are versatile and opportunist foragers. They will jump to take insects from plants, climb to find berries, or dislodge apples from trees so they can be eaten on the ground. They will kill birds by impaling or drowning them, particularly if the bird's ability to escape is restricted. They have been recorded as killing a European greenfinch and a king quail in an aviary, and small birds trapped in bird ringers' mist nets. One bird killed a twite caught with it in a Heligoland trap. They are also nest predators, particularly of small birds that nest in reeds such as the great reed warbler. Water rails may defend a winter feeding territory, although this is smaller than when breeding, with individuals perhaps less than 10 m (11 yd) apart; favoured sites may hold hundreds of birds. Aggressive behaviour outside the breeding season may extend to attacks on other marsh rails such as spotted and Baillon's crake.

== Predators and parasites ==
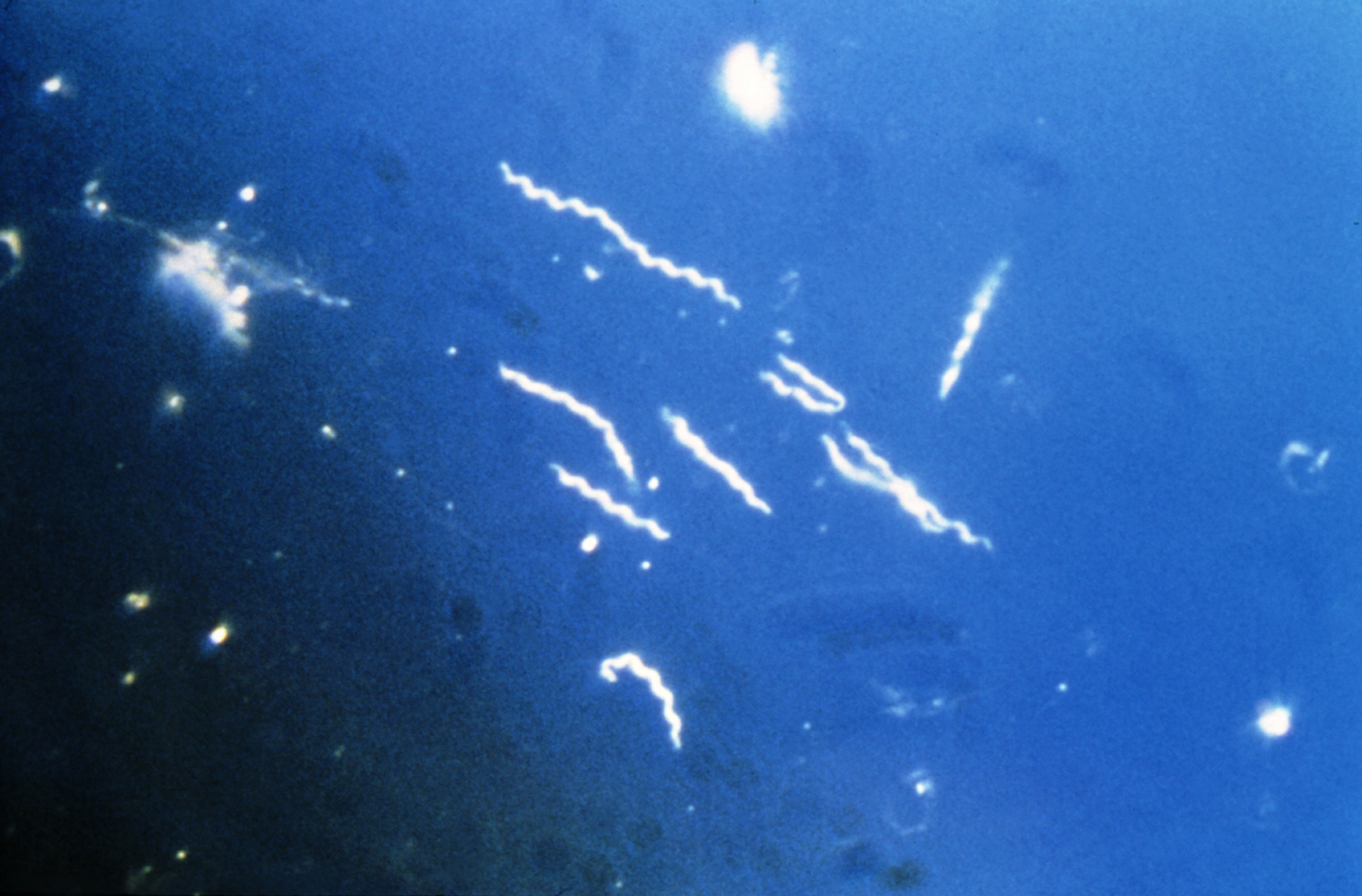
Borrelia burgdorferi spirochaetes shown by dark-field microscopy. Rails can be infected with this bacterial species, which can be transmitted to humans via tick bites causing Lyme disease.

Predators of the water rail include a number of mammals and large birds. The American mink was partly responsible for the extinction of the Icelandic population, and cats and dogs have also been recorded as killing this species. At least locally, otters will also eat rails and other water birds. The Eurasian bittern, another reed bed bird, will consume rails, as will grey herons. Water rails are particularly vulnerable to the heron when forced out of the cover of the reeds by very high tides. Wetland-hunting harriers are predictable predators, but more unusually, the rail has also been recorded as a prey item of the tawny owl, short-eared owl, Eurasian eagle-owl, greater spotted eagle, common kestrel, and night-hunting peregrine falcons.

Parasites include the sucking lice Nirmus cuspidiculus and Pediculus ralli, the tick Ixodes frontalis, and the louse fly Ornithomya avicularia. The water rail can be infected by the avian influenza virus and the bacterium Borrelia burgdorferi, carried by Ixodes ticks, which is also a human pathogen causing Lyme disease. Three lice, Fulicoffula rallina, Pseudomenopon scopulacorne and Rallicola cuspidatus discovered on dead water rails in 2005 on the Faroe Islands were all species that had not been found on the archipelago previously. The parasitic flatworm Ophthalmophagus nasciola was found in one rail's nasal sinus, and at least three species of feather mite have been detected on the plumage. The louse Philopterus ralli and the nematode Strongyloides avium have been found on the closely related brown-cheeked rail R. a. indicus.

== Status ==
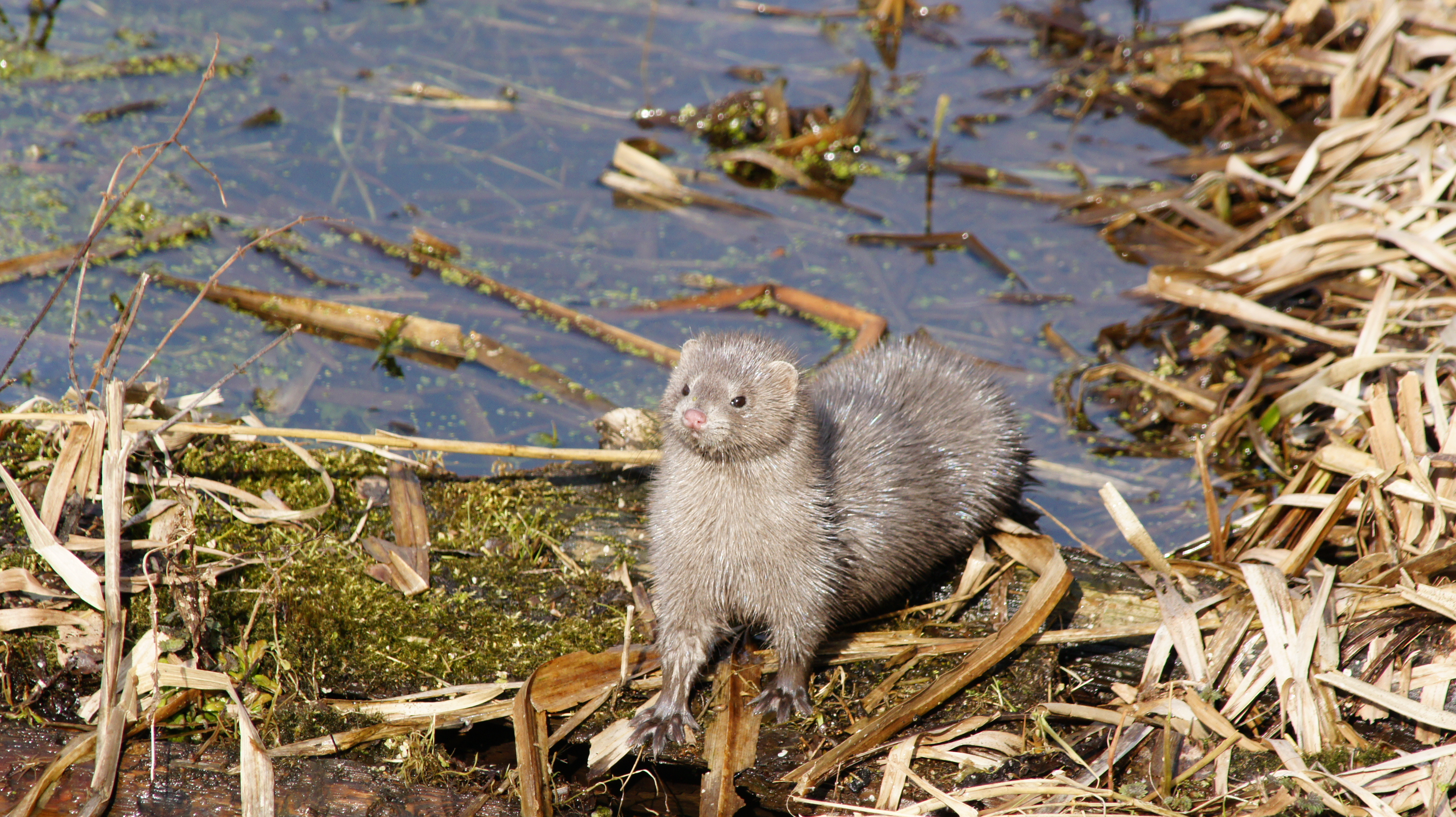
Introduced predators, such as the American mink, have caused marked declines in populations of rails and other ground-nesting birds.

The water rail's numbers are declining, but it has a large population of 100,000–1,000,000 adults and a huge breeding range estimated at 15,600,000 km^{2} (6,000,000 sq mi); it is therefore classed as least concern on the IUCN Red List. In most European countries, the population is either stable or decreasing slightly due to loss of habitat. The rail's range and numbers are increasing in Morocco, with breeding as far south as Oued Massa. Little is known about the Asian range, but korejewi is a common breeder in Pakistan and Kashmir.

Introduced predators are a threat to vulnerable island populations. In addition to the extirpation of the Icelandic race, mink have been responsible for marked declines in the populations of water rails and other ground-nesting birds in the Hebrides, where the mainly fish-eating otter was the only native carnivore. The mink derived from fur farms on Lewis, from whence they spread through Harris, North Uist and South Uist. Mink and ferret eradication programmes have enabled the rail to return to islands including Lewis and Harris, and further projects are ongoing or planned on the Scottish mainland. Locally, habitat may be affected by the drainage of marshes, canalisation of water courses, urban encroachment, and by pollution.

Water rails have been eaten by humans for thousands of years; they were eaten by the Romans, and depicted in wall paintings at Pompeii, and consumption continued through the Middle Ages to modern times.

== Cited texts ==
- Coward, Thomas Alfred (1930). The Birds of the British Isles and their eggs (two volumes). London: Frederick Warne.
- Edwards, Christopher R.W.; Bouchier, Ian A.D., eds. (1991). Davidson's Principles and Practice of Medicine (16th ed.). Edinburgh: Churchill Livingstone. ISBN 978-0-443-04092-4.
- Taylor, Barry; van Perlo, Berl (2000). Rails. Robertsbridge, Sussex: Pica. ISBN 978-1-873403-59-4.
