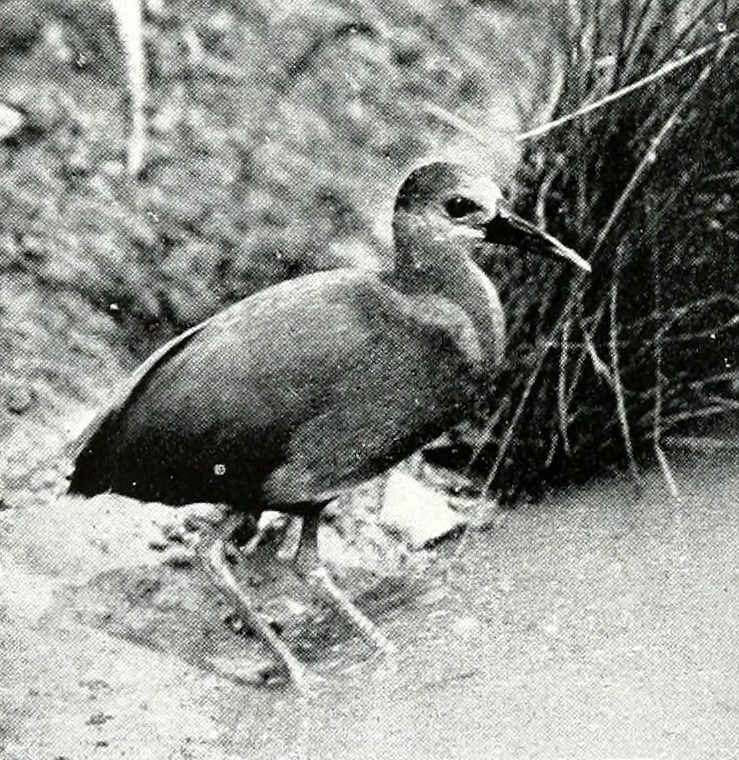

Conservation status
- Near Threatened (IUCN 3.1)

Scientific classification
- Kingdom: Animalia
- Phylum: Chordata
- Class: Aves
- Order: Gruiformes
- Family: Rallidae
- Genus: Rallus
- Species: R. tenuirostris

Binomial name
- Rallus tenuirostris Ridgway, 1874

= Aztec rail =

Species of bird

The Aztec rail or Mexican rail, (Rallus tenuirostris) is a Near Threatened species of bird in subfamily Rallinae of family Rallidae, the rails, gallinules, and coots. It is endemic to Mexico.

== Taxonomy and systematics ==
The Aztec rail was previously treated as conspecific with what are now the mangrove rail (R. longirostris), Ridgway's rail (R. obsoletus), the king rail (R. elegans), and the clapper rail (R. crepitans), and more recently as conspecific with the king rail. Worldwide taxonomic systems now agree that each of the five is a separate species based on a 2013 study that described their different genetics and morphologies. Many systems treat it as most closely related to Ridgway's rail.

The Aztec rail is monotypic.

== Description ==
The Aztec rail is 33 to 42 cm (13 to 17 in) long. Males weigh 271 to 331 g (9.6 to 12 oz) and females 220 to 268 g (7.8 to 9.5 oz). The sexes have similar plumage. The species has dark and light morphs. The dark morph has rich brown upperparts with blackish markings on the back. It has a pale pinkish cheek stripe and a white chin and throat. Its underparts are rufous with dull brown and white to pinkish cinnamon barring on the flanks and white undertail coverts. The light morph's underparts have a pale white center with a pinkish cinnamon wash. Juveniles have duller and darker upperparts and paler underparts than adults.

== Distribution and habitat ==
The Aztec rail is found almost exclusively in central Mexico, in an area roughly defined by Nayarit, San Luis Potosí, Veracruz, and Guerrero. However, between 2013 and 2017 many records were documented in Chihuahua, mostly in the valley of the San Pedro River. The Aztec rail inhabits both seasonal and permanent highland freshwater marshes. In elevation it ranges from 800 m (2,600 ft) up to at least 2,500 m (8,200 ft).

== Behavior ==
=== Movement ===
The Aztec rail is mostly a year-round resident throughout its range but some apparently disperse from permanent wetlands to temporary ones during the May to September rainy season.

=== Feeding ===
The Aztec rail's principal food is crustaceans, especially crayfish, but its diet also includes molluscs, terrestrial and aquatic insects, and possibly spiders, fish, and amphibians.

=== Breeding ===
The Aztec rail's core breeding season extends from May to August but might also include April and September. One well-described nest was a dome made of spikerush (Eleocharis) within a stand of spikerush. The clutch size was five eggs.

=== Vocalization ===
The Aztec rail's courtship calls are a "loud, harsh series of 'kik' or 'kuk'" notes. Both sexes make "a series of 'chac' notes" as an "advertising call". The also give a "soft, rapid 'tuk'."

== Status ==
The IUCN has assessed the Aztec rail as Near Threatened. It has a moderate size range that might be expanding. However, its estimated population of 15,000 mature individuals is believed to be decreasing. Its freshwater marsh habitat is "under threat from increasing agricultural, industrial and urban development".
