= Clapper rail =

- In Belize

Conservation status
- Least Concern (IUCN 3.1)

Scientific classification
- Kingdom: Animalia
- Phylum: Chordata
- Class: Aves
- Order: Gruiformes
- Family: Rallidae
- Genus: Rallus
- Species: R. crepitans

Binomial name
- Rallus crepitans JF Gmelin, 1789
- Year-round Breeding

New world bird of salt marshes, recently split into different species

The clapper rail (Rallus crepitans) is a member of the rail family, Rallidae. The taxonomy for this species is confusing and still being determined. It is a large brown rail that is resident in wetlands along the Atlantic coasts of the eastern United States, eastern Mexico and some Caribbean islands. This species was formerly considered to be conspecific with the mangrove rail.

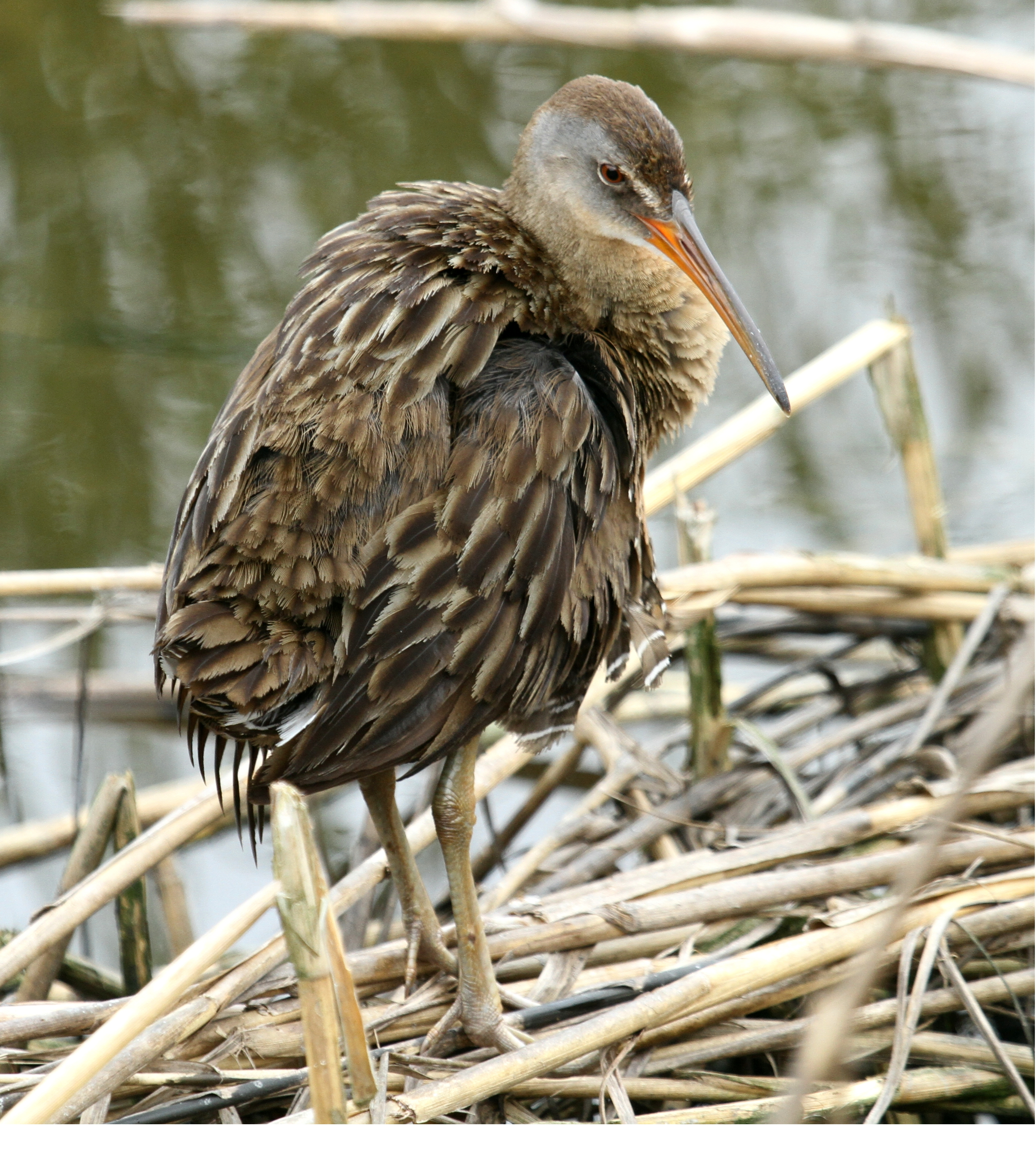
South Padre Island Birding and Nature Center - Texas

== Taxonomy ==
The clapper rail was formally described in 1789 by the German naturalist Johann Friedrich Gmelin in his revised and expanded edition of Carl Linnaeus's Systema Naturae. He placed it with all the other rails in the genus Rallus and coined the binomial name Rallus crepitans. Gmelin based his description on those by Thomas Pennant and John Latham. The type locality is Long Island, New York. The genus Rallus had been erected in 1758 by the Swedish naturalist Carl Linnaeus in the tenth edition of his Systema Naturae. The specific epithet crepitans is Latin meaning "breaking wind" or "resounding".

The clapper rail was formerly treated as a subspecies of the mangrove rail (Rallus longirostris). The decision to treat the clapper rail as a separate species was based on the results of a molecular phylogenetic study that was published in 2013. A cladogram based on the 2013 genetic study is as follows:

- - Virginia rail (Rallus limicola)
  - - - Ridgway's rail (Rallus obsoletus)
      - Aztec rail (Rallus tenuirostris)
    - - Mangrove rail (Rallus longirostris)
      - - King rail (Rallus elegans)
        - Clapper rail (Rallus crepitans)

Eight subspecies of the clapper rail are recognised:

- R. c. crepitans Gmelin, JF, 1789 – coastal Connecticut to northeast North Carolina (USA)
- R. c. waynei Brewster, 1899 – coastal southeast USA
- R. c. saturatus Ridgway, 1880 – Gulf Coast from southwest Alabama to northeast Mexico
- R. c. scottii Sennett, 1888 – coastal Florida (USA)
- R. c. insularum Brooks, WS, 1920 – Florida Keys (USA)
- R. c. coryi Maynard, 1887 – Bahamas
- R. c. caribaeus Ridgway, 1880 – Cuba to Puerto Rico, Lesser Antilles to Antigua and Guadeloupe
- R. c. pallidus Nelson, 1905 – north Yucatán Peninsula, islands off Quintana Roo (southeast Mexico), Ycacos Lagoon (Belize)

== Description ==
The clapper rail is a chicken-sized bird that rarely flies. It is grayish brown with a pale chestnut breast. Males and females have similar plumage. The bill which curves slightly downwards is orange yellow at the base in males and duller in females. An adult bird has an overall length of 32–41 cm (13–16 in) and weighs 199–400 g (7.0–14.1 oz).

== Distribution and habitat ==
The clapper rail is found along the Atlantic coasts of the eastern U.S., the Gulf of Mexico, eastern Mexico, some Caribbean islands, and south through eastern Central America, as well at several inland locales. Populations are stable on the East Coast of the U.S., although the numbers of this bird have declined due to habitat loss. Clapper rails are saltmarsh specialists, and are highly mobile across their range, with females showing weak philopatry and a lack of philopatry in males.

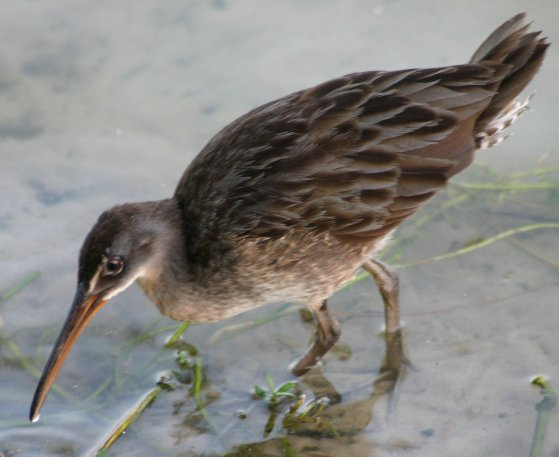
Clapper rail in Lakeland, Florida.

== Behaviour ==
=== Feeding ===
These birds eat crustaceans, aquatic insects, and small fish. They search for food while walking, sometimes probing with their long bills, in shallow water or mud.

=== Breeding ===
The nest is a large platform of dry grasses and is usually placed on the ground in dense vegetation. The clutch size varies between four and sixteen eggs with an average of nine. The eggs measure 42.5 mm × 30 mm (1.67 in × 1.18 in) and are creamy white with irregular blotches of reddish-brown, grey or lilac. They are incubated for 20 days by both parents with the male incubating at night. The young are brooded by the adults for several days. They become independent of the adults when six weeks old and can fly when 10 weeks old.
