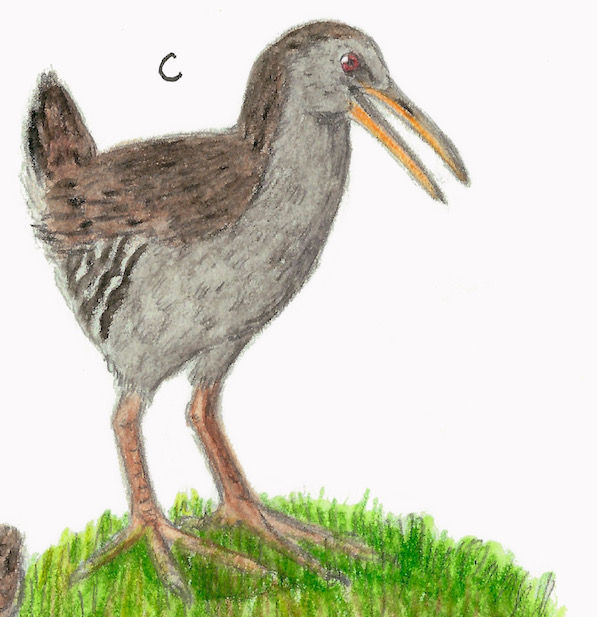
- Artist's illustration of Rallus carvaoensis, how it may have appeared while living.

Scientific classification
- Kingdom: Animalia
- Phylum: Chordata
- Class: Aves
- Order: Gruiformes
- Family: Rallidae
- Genus: Rallus
- Species: †R. carvaoensis

Binomial name
- †Rallus carvaoensis Alcover et al., 2015

= São Miguel rail =

São Miguel rail Temporal range: Holocene

Extinct species of bird

The São Miguel rail (Rallus carvaoensis) is an extinct species of Rallus that inhabited São Miguel Island in the Azores during the Holocene epoch.
