= Plain-flanked rail =

Conservation status
- Endangered (IUCN 3.1)

Scientific classification
- Kingdom: Animalia
- Phylum: Chordata
- Class: Aves
- Order: Gruiformes
- Family: Rallidae
- Genus: Rallus
- Species: R. wetmorei

Binomial name
- Rallus wetmorei Zimmer & Phelps, 1944

Species of bird

The plain-flanked rail (Rallus wetmorei) is an Endangered species of bird in subfamily Rallinae of family Rallidae, the rails, gallinules, and coots. It is endemic to Venezuela. It is a large rail with two distinct color morphs.

== Taxonomy and systematics ==
The plain-flanked rail has been suggested to be conspecific with the mangrove rail (R. longirostris) but this treatment has not been accepted by major taxonomic systems because the two do not interbreed where their ranges overlap. The plain-flanked rail is monotypic.

== Description ==
The plain-flanked rail is a large rail with two distinct color morphs. The pale morph being olive-brown in color with dark streaks, while the dark morph is brown to sooty.

Standard Measurements
	Male	Female
Total Length	31–35 cm (12–14 in)	27–31 cm (11–12 in)
Wing length	12.7–13.7 cm (5.0–5.4 in)	11.5–13.7 cm (4.5–5.4 in)
Tarsus	43.5–47.1 mm (1.71–1.85 in)	36.6–44.5 mm (1.44–1.75 in)
Weight	180–255 g (6.3–9.0 oz)	

== Distribution and habitat ==
The plain-flanked rail is known from only a few locations on the Caribbean coast of Venezuela between eastern Falcón and western Aragua states. It primarily inhabits coastal mangroves and has also been found in emergent vegetation of brackish and saltwater lagoons and marshes.

== Behavior ==
=== Movement ===
The plain-flanked rail is apparently sedentary.

=== Feeding ===
It forages at low levels in mangrove forests, or on edges near mudflats. The diet likely consists of aquatic invertebrates, and fiddler crabs are documented prey. At low tide, it ventures onto mudflats and probes in fiddler crab burrows.

=== Breeding ===
The plain-flanked rail's breeding season may range from February to May, based on breeding and nesting behaviors. The nests platforms of twigs and leaves placed on mangrove roots or in mangrove trees. The clutch size ranges from four to seven. The eggs are oval and buffy-white with irregular colored spots mostly on the larger end. On average, the eggs measure 41.3 mm × 29.5 mm (1.63 in × 1.16 in) in dimensions and can weigh 18.5–22 g (0.65–0.78 oz). Both parents have been observed incubating.

=== Vocalization ===
The plain-flanked rail's "advertising call" is "a series of loud, rapid 'kek-kek-kek...kek-kek-kek' notes". Calls are made when a separated pair meets to signal location, in territory defense, and in response to loud calls of other pairs. The species also makes a grunting call.

== Status ==
The IUCN originally assessed the plain-flanked rail in 1988 as Threatened; from 1994 it has been classed as Endangered. It has a very small range and an estimated population of 200 to 1,000 mature individuals that is believed to be decreasing. Its mangrove habitat continues to be destroyed by development for tourism and what remains is also threatened by domestic and industrial pollution.
