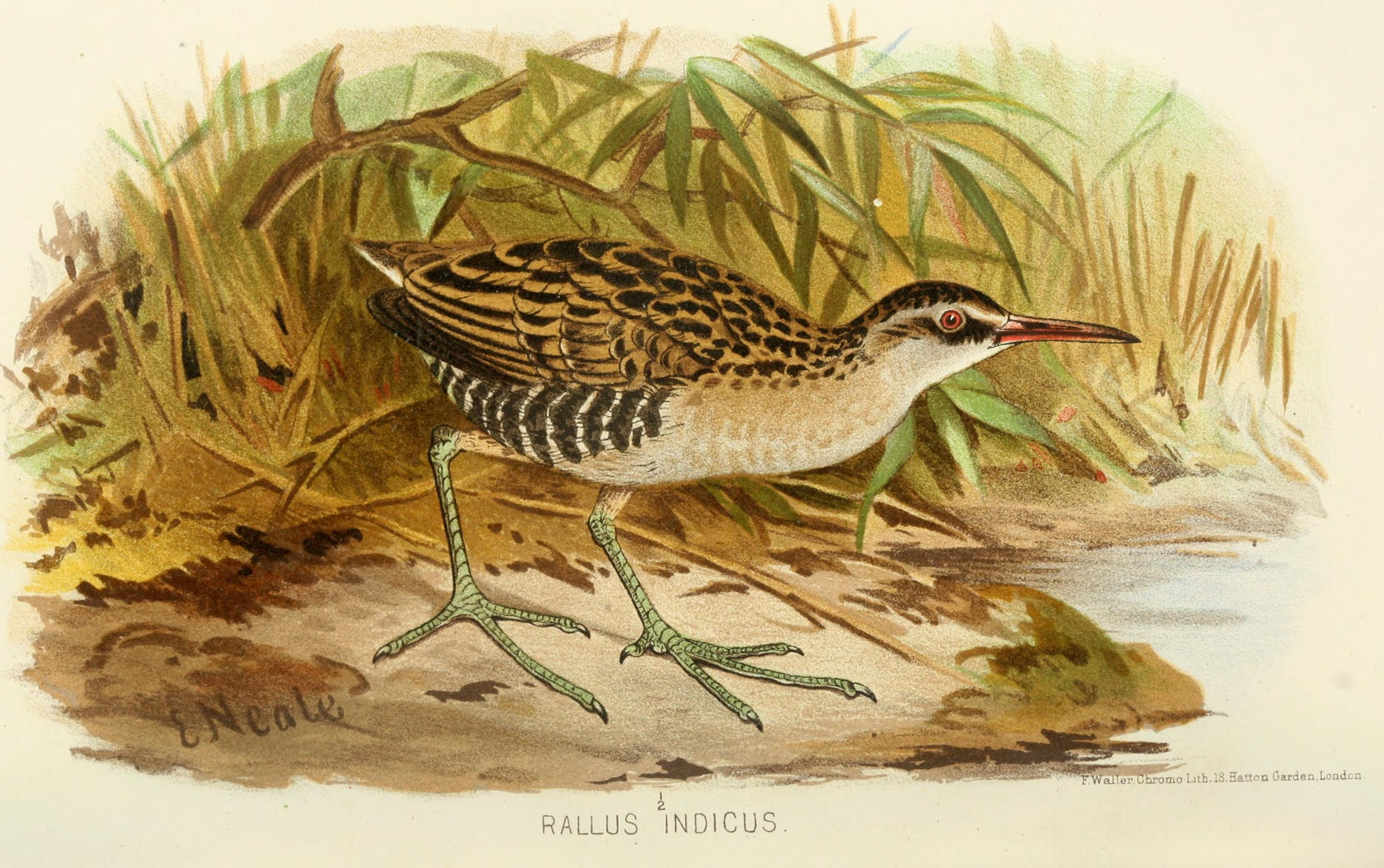

Conservation status
- Least Concern (IUCN 3.1)

Scientific classification
- Kingdom: Animalia
- Phylum: Chordata
- Class: Aves
- Order: Gruiformes
- Family: Rallidae
- Genus: Rallus
- Species: R. indicus

Binomial name
- Rallus indicus Blyth, 1849
- Breeding summer visitor Resident year-round Winter visitor (ranges are approximate)

= Brown-cheeked rail =

Brown-cheeked rail Temporal range: Pleistocene to Recent, 534,000 - 0.00 years ago

Species of bird

The brown-cheeked rail or eastern water rail (Rallus indicus) is a species of bird in the family Rallidae. It breeds in northern Mongolia, eastern Siberia, northeast China, Korea and northern Japan, and winters in southeast Asia. It used to be considered a subspecies of the water rail.

== Description ==
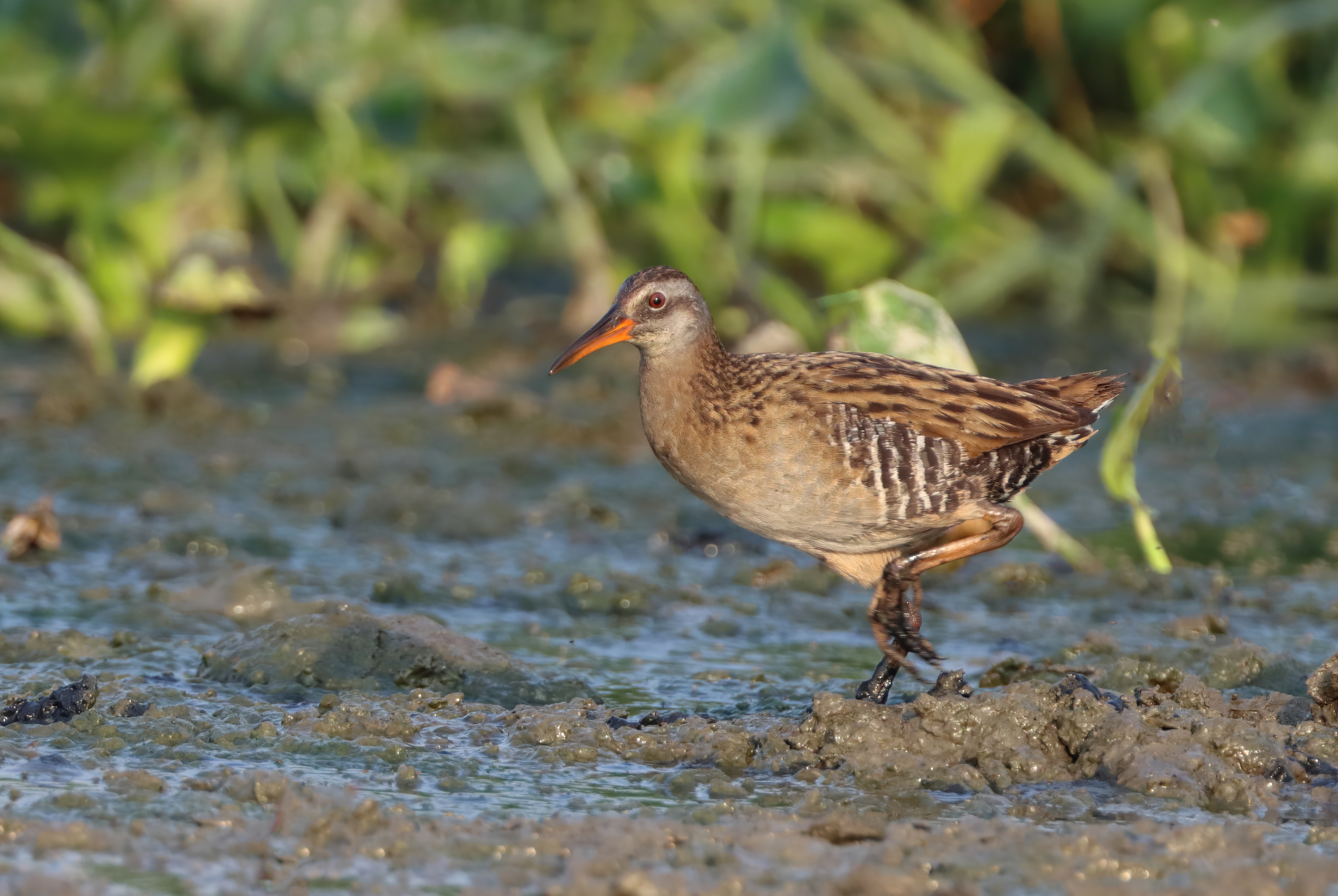
At Chittagong, Bangladesh

The species differs from the slightly smaller nominate form through its paler upperparts, brown-tinged underparts and a brown stripe through the eye. Compared to R. a. korejewi, it is darker above, has a browner breast, white on the throat and a more obvious brown eyestripe. As indicated above, it has different vocalisations to the other forms, and is now usually given full species status, although its behaviour, nest and eggs are identical to those of other subspecies of water rail.

The brown-cheeked rail is 23–29 cm (9.1–11.4 in) in length and can weigh 75–190 g (2.6–6.7 oz).

In addition to its distinctive plumage, it has very different vocalisations from the water rail, and it was considered a separate species in early works, including the first edition (1898) of Fauna of British India, but later demoted to a subspecies by E. C. Stuart Baker in the second edition (1929). It was restored as a full species, the eastern water rail, R. indicus, by Pamela Rasmussen in her Birds of South Asia (2005). Rasmussen, an expert on Asian birds, also renamed the other forms as the western water rail. Her treatment has gained acceptance, and is followed in Birds of Malaysia and Singapore (2010). A 2010 study of molecular phylogeny further supported the possibility of specific status for R. a. indicus, which is estimated to have diverged from the western forms around 534,000 years ago. The paper also suggested that the differences between the three other races were clinal, and that they should all be merged into R. a. aquaticus.

The call is quite different from that of the water rail. The courtship call, again given throughout the year, is a sharp piping kyu, longer and clearer than that of the European race. The song is a series of metallic slurred shrink, shrink notes, about two per second, and repeated after a short pause. The eastern race does not respond to recorded announcement calls of nominate R. a. aquaticus.

== Distribution and habitat ==
The species is mainly migratory, wintering in southern Japan, eastern China and northern Borneo. It is uncommon in northern parts of Bangladesh, Burma, Laos, and northern and central Thailand, and does not normally reach further south in mainland southeast Asia. Migrants have been recorded on Sri Lanka in the past, although on the Indian mainland they are found mainly in the northern regions, with a few records from as far south as Mumbai. On arrival in India, rails may be so exhausted that they can be caught by hand. The breeding birds on the Japanese island of Hokkaido mostly migrate well south including to Korea but a few remain during winter in the coastal marshes of Honshu.

== Behavior ==
The brown-cheeked rail primarily feeds on worms, small insects, and molluscs, supplemented by seeds.

It lays eggs from April to May, the nest is a cup of dead leaves and stems of marsh plants. The clutch is typically 5–12 eggs. The average weight of wind-dried nests of R. indicus in Japan was 95 g (3.4 oz).
