= Carex acutata =

Conservation status
- Critically Endangered (IUCN 3.1)

Scientific classification
- Kingdom: Plantae
- Clade: Embryophytes
- Clade: Tracheophytes
- Clade: Spermatophytes
- Clade: Angiosperms
- Clade: Monocots
- Clade: Commelinids
- Order: Poales
- Family: Cyperaceae
- Genus: Carex
- Species: C. acutata

Binomial name
- Carex acutata Boott

Synonyms
- List: Carex acutata var. ciliata Kük.; Carex anwandteri Phil.; Carex feminea Steud. ex Boott; Carex foeminea Steud.; Carex physocarpa Nees ex Boott; Carex purpurea Boott; Carex tessellata Spruce ex C.B.Clarke

Species of sedge

Carex acutata (common name, slender-tufted sedge, slender-spiked sedge) is a species of sedge, a perennial flowering plant, in the family Cyperaceae. It was first formally named by Francis Boott in 1846.

== Description ==
Carex acutata is a tuft-forming sedge, with clumps of slender, narrow leaves reaching up to 90cm in height. The inflorescence forms a series of spikes, with brownish flowers, appearing in late spring and summer.

== Distribution and habitat ==
Carex acutata is native to South America. In Bolivia, it occurs at elevations of 3,500–4,000 m (11,500–13,100 ft). It is distributed in mountainous habitats of the Tropical Andes, from Bolivia to Venezuela.

== Taxonomy ==
The name Carex tessellata was included in the Ecuadorian Red List as a “mysterious species known from a single collection of uncertain precedence”. The name was synonymised in 2020 to Carex acutata.
