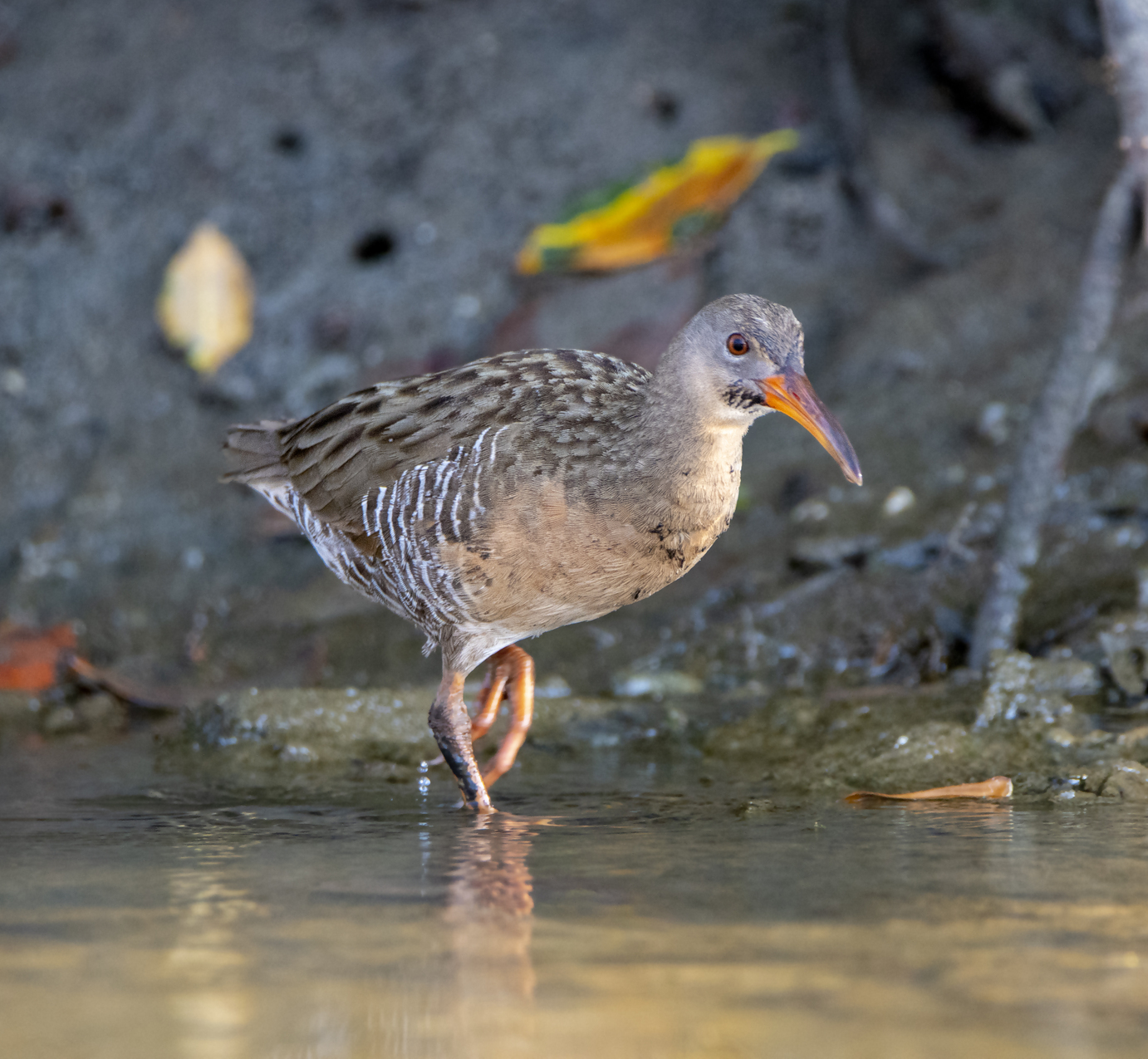

Conservation status
- Least Concern (IUCN 3.1)

Scientific classification
- Kingdom: Animalia
- Phylum: Chordata
- Class: Aves
- Order: Gruiformes
- Family: Rallidae
- Genus: Rallus
- Species: R. longirostris

Binomial name
- Rallus longirostris Boddaert, 1783

= Mangrove rail =

Species of bird

The mangrove rail (Rallus longirostris) is a species of bird in subfamily Rallinae of family Rallidae, the rails, gallinules, and coots. It is found in Central and South America.

== Taxonomy and systematics ==
The mangrove rail was described by the French polymath Georges-Louis Leclerc, Comte de Buffon in 1781 in his Histoire Naturelle des Oiseaux from a specimen obtained in French Guiana. The bird was also illustrated in a hand-colored plate engraved by François-Nicolas Martinet in the Planches Enluminées D'Histoire Naturelle which was produced under the supervision of Edme-Louis Daubenton to accompany Buffon's text. Neither the plate caption nor Buffon's description included a scientific name but in 1783 the Dutch naturalist Pieter Boddaert coined the binomial name Rallus longirostris in his catalogue of the Planches Enluminées. The genus Rallus had been erected in 1758 by the Swedish naturalist Carl Linnaeus in the tenth edition of his Systema Naturae. The specific epithet longirostris combines the Latin longus meaning "long" and -rostris meaning "-billed".

The mangrove rail was formerly considered to be conspecific with what are now the Aztec rail (R. tenuirostris), Ridgway's rail (R. obsoletus), the king rail (R. elegans), and the clapper rail (R. crepitans), and more recently as conspecific with Ridgeway's and king rails. Worldwide taxonomic systems now agree that each of the five is a separate species based on a 2013 study that described their different genetics and morphologies. Many systems treat it as most closely related to Ridgway's rail.

Eight subspecies of mangrove rail are recognized:

- R. l. phelpsi Wetmore, 1941
- R. l. dillonripleyi Phelps Jr. & Aveledo, 1987
- R. l. margaritae Zimmer & Phelps, 1944
- R. l. pelodramus Oberholser, 1937
- R. l. longirostris Boddaert, 1783
- R. l. crassirostris Lawrence, 1871
- R. l. cypereti Taczanowski, 1878
- R. l. berryorum J.M. Maley, J.E. McCormack, W.L.E. Tsai, E.M. Schwab, J. Van Dort, R.C. Roselvy, & M.D. Carling, 2016

== Description ==
The mangrove rail is about 33 cm (13 in) long and weighs 260 to 310 g (9.2 to 11 oz). It has a long, slender, and slightly decurved bill with a brownish maxilla and an orange-yellow mandible. Its legs are light orange-red. The sexes have the same plumage. Adults of the nominate subspecies R. l. longirostris have dull gray-brown upperparts with darker centers to the feathers. They have a white loral streak on their pale gray face, a whitish throat, tawny buff neck and breast with a white center to the belly, and black and white bars on the flanks. Juveniles are similar to adults but are darker and duller.

Subspecies R. l. phelpsi has a darker crown and upperparts and paler underparts than the nominate. R. l. margaritae is the darkest subspecies; it is smaller than the nominate and has bolder bars on the flanks. R. l. pelodramus is similar in size to margaritae but paler. The dark markings on the upperparts of R. l. cypereti are lighter than those of the nominate and the dark flank bars are also lighter.

== Distribution and habitat ==
The mangrove rail is found discontinuously on the Pacific coast of Central America and the Pacific, Caribbean, and Atlantic coasts of South America. It inhabits coastal mangrove swamps and brackish and salt marshes. The subspecies are distributed thus:

- R. l. phelpsi Wetmore, 1941 – northeastern Colombia's La Guajira Department into northwestern Venezuela as far as Miranda state
- R. l. dillonripleyi Phelps Jr & Aveledo, 1987 – northeastern Venezuela's Sucre state
- R. l. margaritae Zimmer, JT & Phelps, 1944 – Margarita Island off the Venezuelan coast
- R. l. pelodramus Oberholser, 1937 – Trinidad
- R. l. longirostris Boddaert, 1783 – Guyana, Suriname and French Guiana
- R. l. crassirostris Lawrence, 1871 – Brazil from the Amazon estuary south to Santa Catarina state
- R. l. cypereti Taczanowski, 1878 – from Nariño Department in southwestern Colombia through Ecuador into Peru's Department of Tumbes
- R. l. berryorum Maley et al., 2016 - El Salvador, Honduras, and Nicaragua. The population in northwestern Costa Rica is believed to also belong to this subspecies.

== Behavior ==
=== Movement ===
The mangrove rail is sedentary.

=== Feeding ===
The mangrove rail forages near cover, mostly at low tide and during the morning and early evening. It is believed to hunt by sight, probing sand and mud, tossing aside leaf litter to expose prey, catching small fish in shallow water, and scavenging dead fish. It has a very diverse diet that includes animal prey such as crustaceans (especially crabs and crayfish), molluscs, leeches, aquatic and terrestrial insects, fish, and amphibians. It also feeds on plant matter such as seeds, berries, and tubers, especially in winter.

=== Breeding ===
The mangrove rail's breeding season varies geographically but in most areas includes May and June. It makes a nest of sticks and dead leaves near water on the ground or in vegetation. The clutch size is three to seven eggs. Both sexes incubate the eggs for the period of 18 to 29 days.

=== Vocalization ===
The mangrove rail's main vocalization is a "[l]oud clattering 'kek-kek-kek…'" that accelerates and then slows; it makes this call mostly at dawn and dusk. Both sexes make "a series of loud, rapid 'kak' notes" as an "advertising call". Another call is a "drawn-out low 'raaaaa'."

== Status ==
The IUCN has assessed the mangrove rail as being of Least Concern. It has a very large range but its population size is not known and is believed to be decreasing. No immediate threats have been identified. A longer term threat is "the degradation and loss of mangroves and other wetland habitats."
