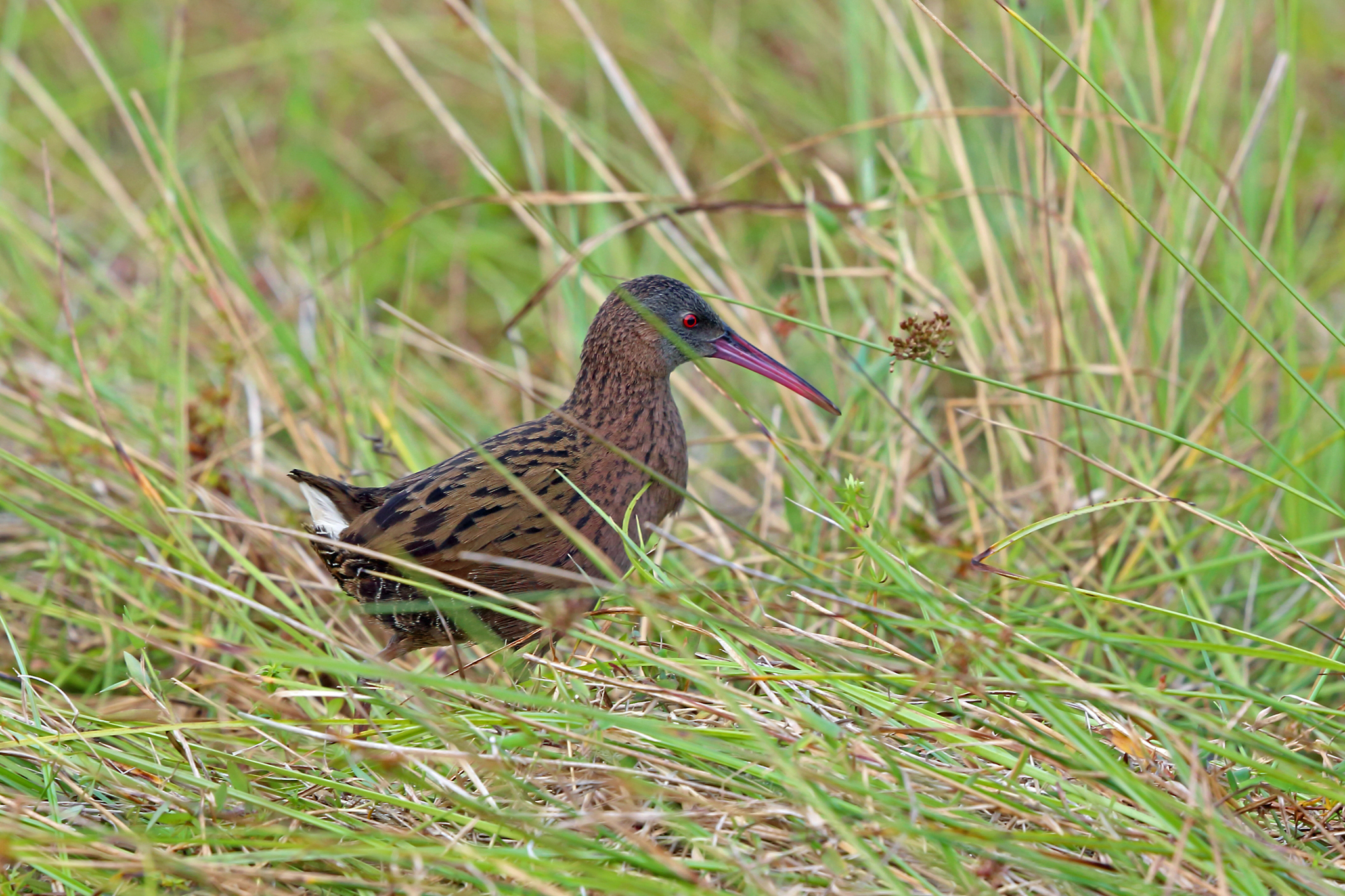

Conservation status
- Vulnerable (IUCN 3.1)

Scientific classification
- Kingdom: Animalia
- Phylum: Chordata
- Class: Aves
- Order: Gruiformes
- Family: Rallidae
- Genus: Rallus
- Species: R. madagascariensis

Binomial name
- Rallus madagascariensis Verreaux, 1833

Synonyms
- Biensis typus Pucheran, 1845

= Madagascar rail =

Species of bird

The Madagascar rail (Rallus madagascariensis) is a species of bird in the family Rallidae. It is endemic to Madagascar.

This is a medium-sized rail measuring 25 cm (9.8 in). Its plumage is mostly plain brown with some streaks on the upperparts and upper breast. Its face and throat are greyish and its undertail is white. The bill is red and the legs are dark.

Its natural habitats are subtropical or tropical moist lowland forest, subtropical or tropical moist montane forest, and freshwater marshes. It is threatened by habitat loss.
