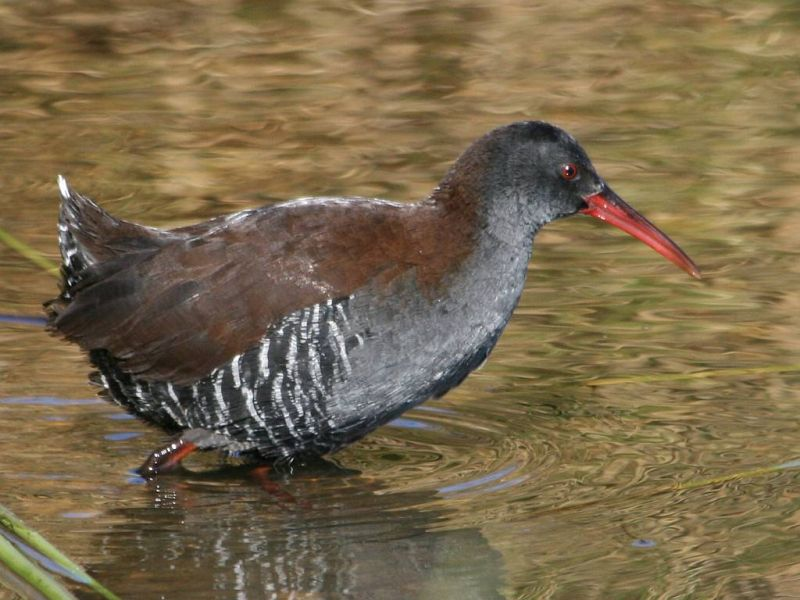
- Cedara Farm, Pietermaritzburg, KwaZulu-Natal, South Africa

Conservation status
- Least Concern (IUCN 3.1)

Scientific classification
- Kingdom: Animalia
- Phylum: Chordata
- Class: Aves
- Order: Gruiformes
- Family: Rallidae
- Genus: Rallus
- Species: R. caerulescens

Binomial name
- Rallus caerulescens Gmelin, 1789

= African rail =

Species of bird

The African rail (Rallus caerulescens), sometimes also Kaffir rail, is a small wetland bird of the rail family that is found in eastern and southern Africa.

== Taxonomy ==
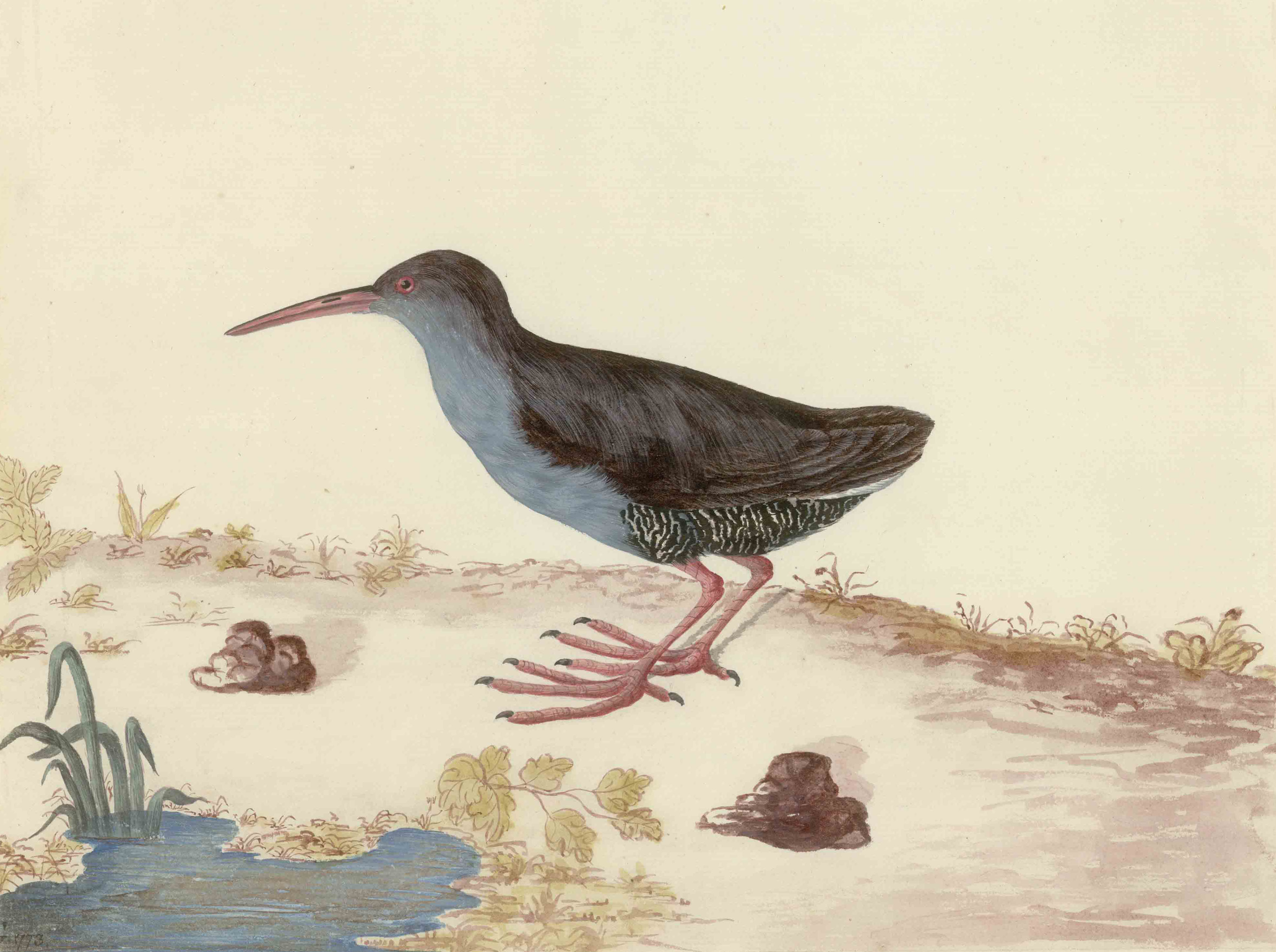
Watercolour made by Georg Forster on James Cook's second voyage to the Pacific Ocean. This picture is the holotype for the species.

The African rail was formally described in 1789 by the German naturalist Johann Friedrich Gmelin in his revised and expanded edition of Carl Linnaeus's Systema Naturae. He placed it with all the other rails in the genus Rallus and coined the binomial name Rallus caerulescens. Gmelin based his description on the "blue necked rail" from the Cape of Good Hope that had been described in 1785 by the English ornithologist John Latham in his book A General Synopsis of Birds. The naturalist Joseph Banks had provided Latham with a water-colour drawing of the rail by Georg Forster who had accompanied James Cook on his second voyage to the Pacific Ocean. The picture was painted in 1773 at the Cape of Good Hope. It is now the holotype for the species and is held by the Natural History Museum in London. The specific epithet caerulescens is from Latin and means "bluish". The species is monotypic: no subspecies are recognised.

== Description ==
Adults are 27–28 cm (10.6–11.0 in) long, and have mainly brown upperparts and blue-grey underparts, with black-and-white barring on the flanks and undertail. The sexes have similar plumage but the female is smaller. Males weigh 146–205 g (5.1–7.2 oz) and females weigh 120–170 g (4.2–6.0 oz). This is the only Rallus species with a plain back. The body is flattened laterally to allow easier passage through the reeds. They have long toes, a short tail and a long slim dull red bill. The legs are red. Immature birds are similar to the adults, but the blue-grey is replaced by buff.

They are noisy birds, with a trilled whistled treee-tee-tee-tee-tee call.

== Distribution and habitat ==
Its breeding habitat is marshes and reedbeds across eastern and southern Africa from Ethiopia to South Africa. Many birds are permanent residents, but some undertake seasonal movements in response to the availability of wetland.

== Behaviour ==
=== Breeding ===
The African rail nests in a dry location in marsh vegetation, both sexes building the cup nest. The typical clutch is 2–6 heavily spotted creamy-white eggs, which are incubated by both sexes for about 20 days to hatching. The precocial downy chicks are black, as with all rails.

=== Food and feeding ===
These birds probe with their bill in mud or shallow water, also picking up food by sight. They mainly eat insects, crabs and other small aquatic animals.
