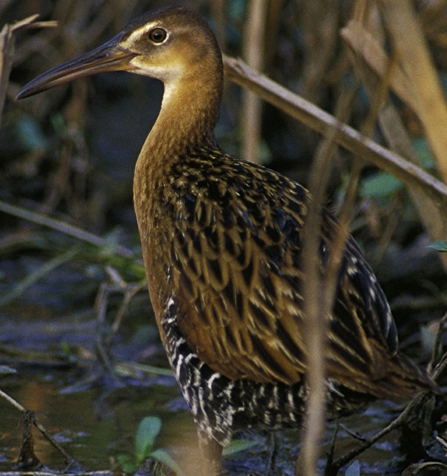

Conservation status
- Near Threatened (IUCN 3.1)

Scientific classification
- Kingdom: Animalia
- Phylum: Chordata
- Class: Aves
- Order: Gruiformes
- Family: Rallidae
- Genus: Rallus
- Species: R. elegans

Binomial name
- Rallus elegans Audubon, 1834
- Breeding Year-round

= King rail =

Species of bird

The king rail (Rallus elegans) is a large, mostly brown rail native to North America, where it breeds in marshes.

== Description ==
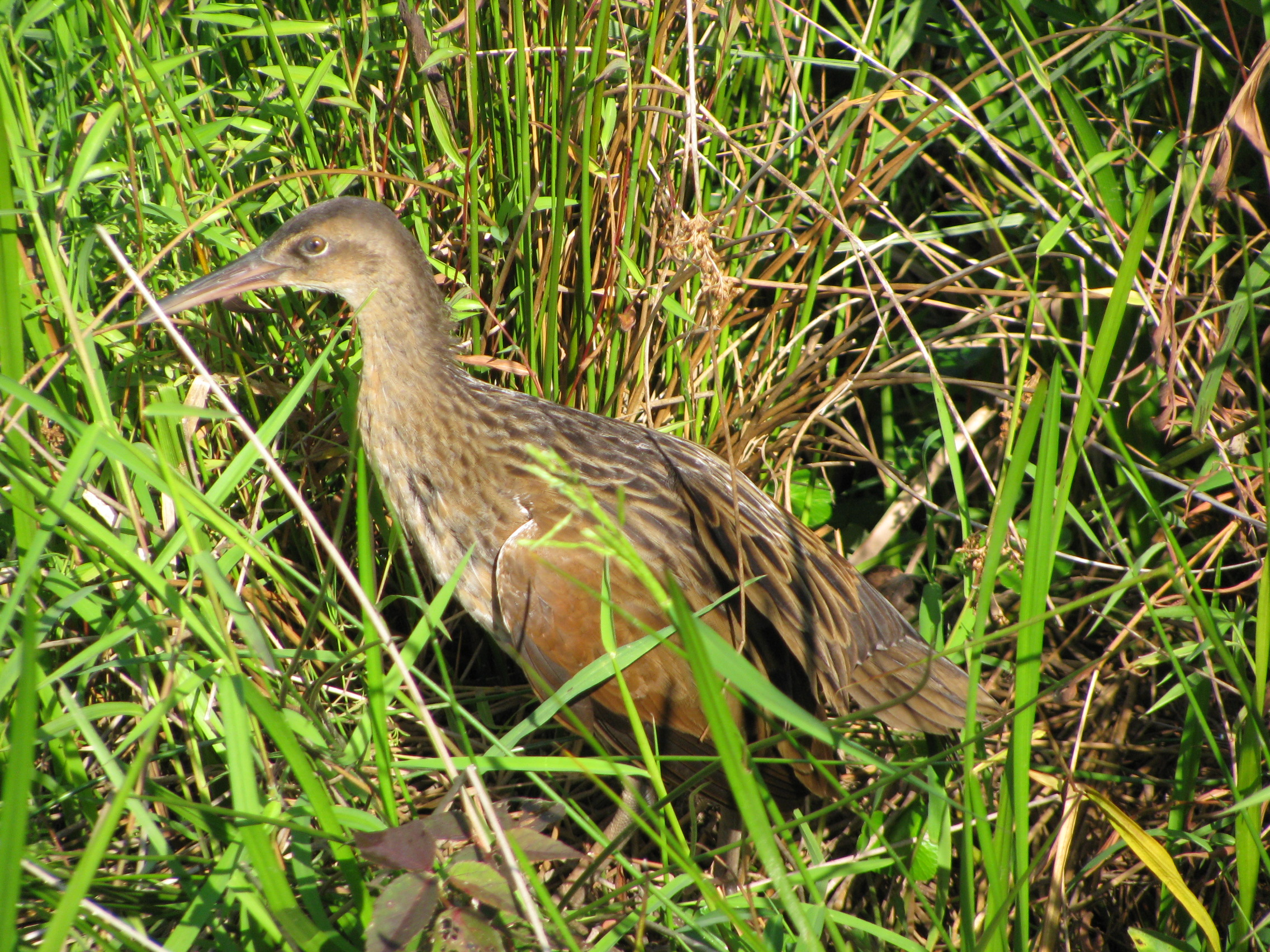
At Huntley Meadows in Virginia

Distinct features are a long bill with a slight downward curve, with adults being brown on the back and rusty-brown on the face and breast with a dark brown cap. They also have a white throat and a light belly with barred flanks. Undertail coverts are white and are displayed by the male during courtship. Immature birds are covered in down, with light brown on the head and darker brown on the back and wings.

The males are larger than females, the male weighing on average 369 g (13.0 oz) and the female weighing 309 g (10.9 oz).

This bird's call is a low repeated grunt transcribed as kek-kek-kek.

Standard Measurements
| length | 15.5–19 in (390–480 mm) |
| wingspan | 19 in (480 mm) |
| wing | 159–177 mm (6.3–7.0 in) |
| tail | 56–72.5 mm (2.20–2.85 in) |
| culmen | 58–65.5 mm (2.28–2.58 in) |
| tarsus | 52–64 mm (2.0–2.5 in) |

== Distribution and habitat ==
This bird breeds in marshes in eastern North America. Birds along the southeastern coasts of the United States are permanent residents. Other birds migrate to the southern United States and Mexico; in Canada, they are found in southern Ontario. An adult king rail will molt completely after nesting and it becomes flightless for almost a month.

== Ecology ==
This bird is diurnal, contrasting with its smaller, nocturnal relatives.

=== Breeding ===
The nest is a raised platform built with marsh vegetation and covered by a canopy. This is to hide the eggs of this bird from predators that are searching from above.

The king rail interbreeds with the clapper rail (Rallus crepitans) where their ranges overlap; It can be argued that these two birds belong to the same species according to the biological species concept.

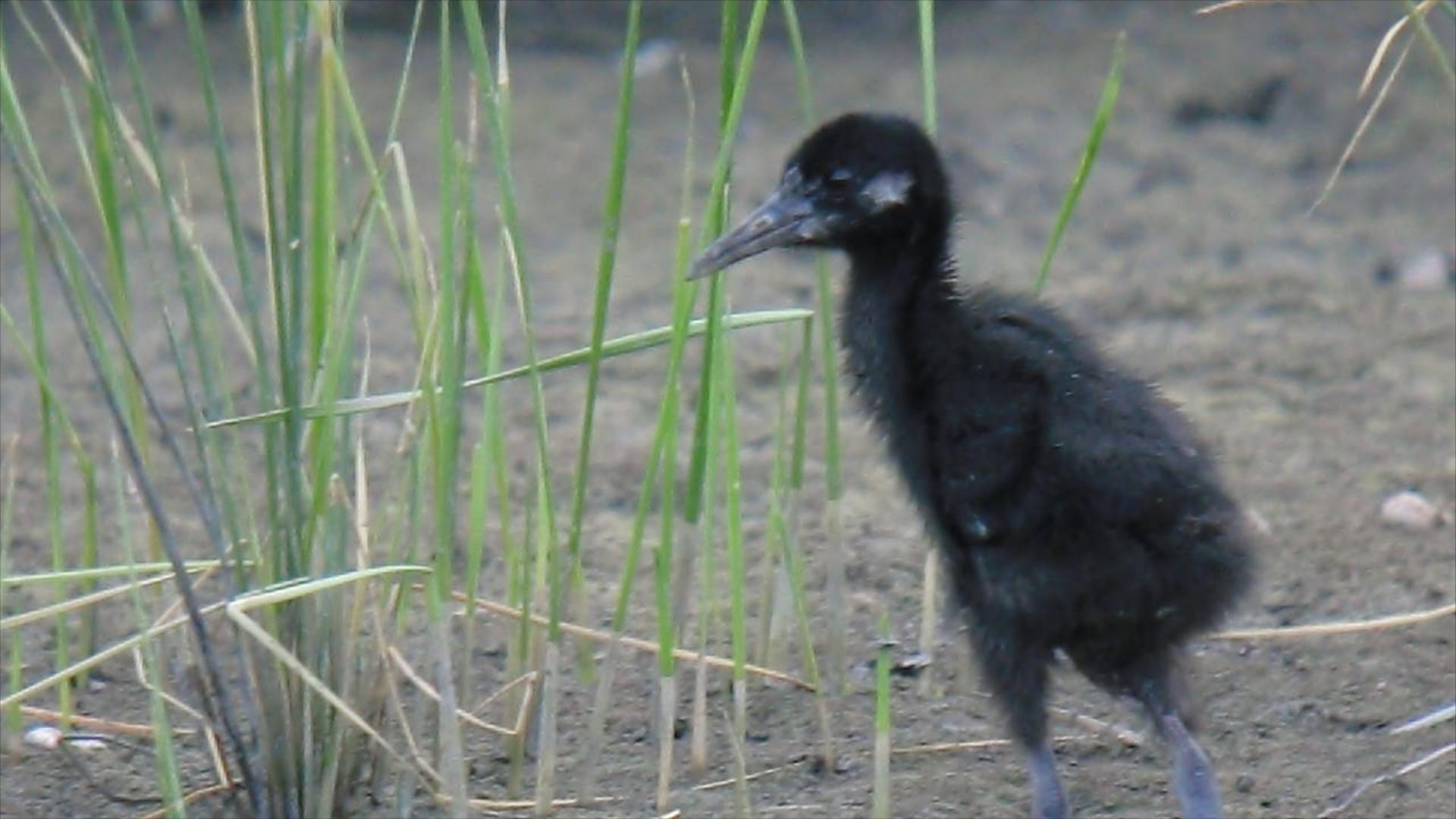
A chick

The king rail lays a clutch of 6 to 14 pale buff eggs with brown spotting. They usually measure 41 by 30 millimetres (1.6 by 1.2 in). Both parents incubate the eggs for 21 to 23 days. When the eggs hatch, the young are covered in down and are able to leave the nest. They are not able to feed themselves, though, and thus must rely on their parents for food for up to six weeks after they hatch.

=== Feeding ===
This rail forages in shallow water near cover and eats mainly aquatic insects and crustaceans. It forages by probing the mud while moving around in shallow water.

The chicks are fed small arthropod prey by their parents. The prey is transferred from one parent's beak to that of the chick.

Males often give food to whomever they pursue during courtship.

== Status ==
These birds are still common in some coastal areas, although interior populations have declined due to habitat loss. In Michigan, it is considered a legally protected state endangered species, at an imperiled level.
