= Kankakee =

Kankakee may refer to

== Places ==
- Kankakee, Illinois, U.S.
- Kankakee, Indiana, U.S.
- Kankakee Community College, a public community college in Kankakee, Illinois, U.S.
- Kankakee County, Illinois, U.S.
- Kankakee National Wildlife Refuge and Conservation Area, a protected area in Iroquois County, Illinois, U.S.
- Kankakee River State Park, state park located primarily in Kankakee County and Will County, Illinois, U.S.
- Kankakee State Hospital, former name of the Samuel H. Shapiro Developmental Center in Kankakee, Illinois, U.S.
- Kankakee Valley High School, a public secondary school in Wheatfield Township, Indiana, U.S.

== Geology ==
- Kankakee Arch, a geologic arch in the United States beneath northeastern Illinois, northern Indiana, and southeastern Wisconsin
- Kankakee Outwash Plain, a flat plain in northwestern Indiana and northeastern Illinois in the United States
- Kankakee River, a river in northwestern Indiana and northeastern Illinois in the United States
- Kankakee Torrent, a catastrophic flood in the Midwestern United States that occurred in ca. 17,000 BCE
- Lake Kankakee, a prehistoric lake in the valley of the Kankakee River in the United States

== Others ==
- Kankakee, Beaverville and Southern Railroad, a railroad serving east-central Illinois and west-central Indiana in the United States
- USCGC Kankakee, a United States Coast Guard cutter built in 1919 used on the Mississippi River
