= Kankakee National Wildlife Refuge and Conservation Area =

National Wildlife Refuge in Illinois

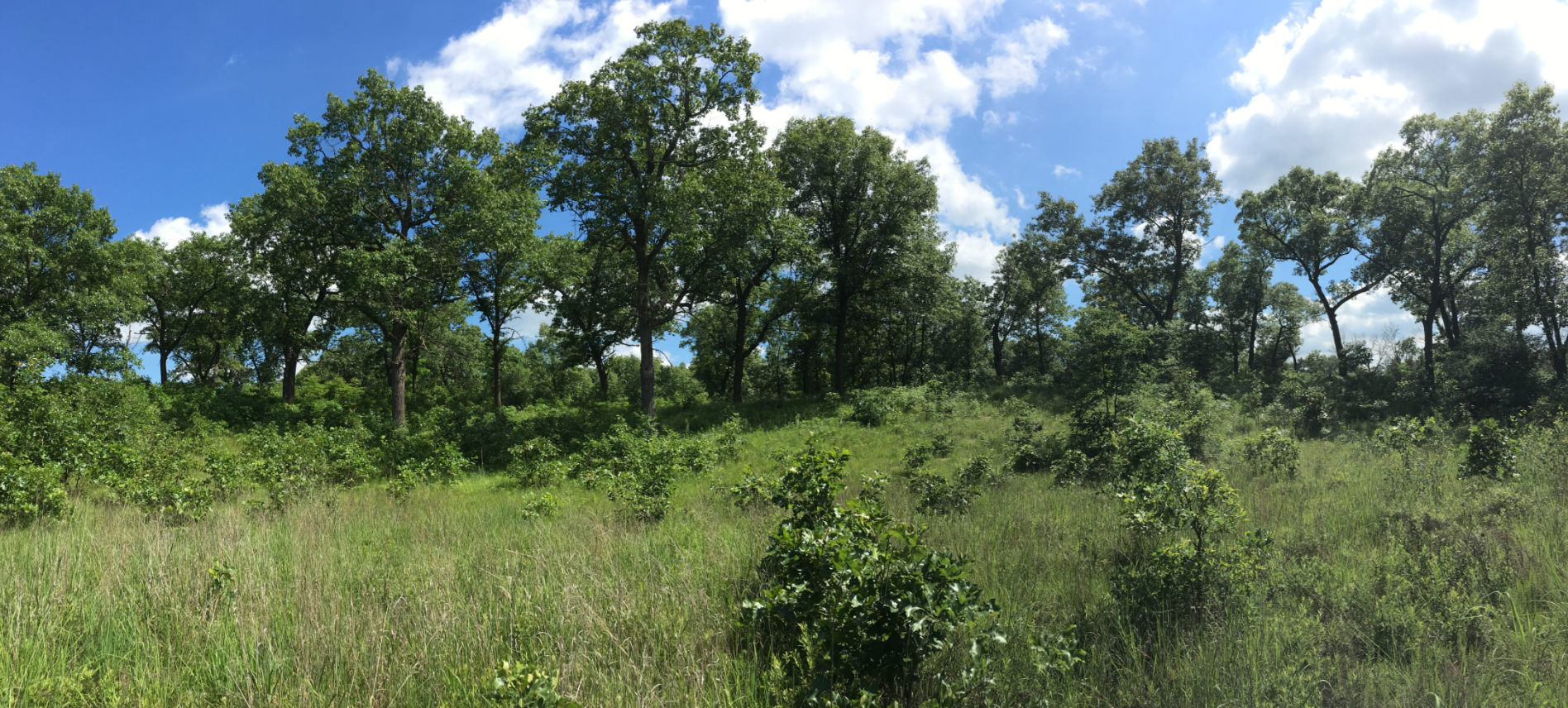
- An oak savanna in the Kankakee National Wildlife Refuge and Conservation Area

- Location within Illinois Location within the United States
- Location: Iroquois County, Illinois, United States
- Nearest city: Pembroke Township, Illinois
- Coordinates: 41°00′27″N 87°32′24″W
- Area: 66 acres (27 ha)
- Established: May 25, 2016
- Governing body: United States Fish and Wildlife Service
- Website: Kankakee National Wildlife Refuge and Conservation Area

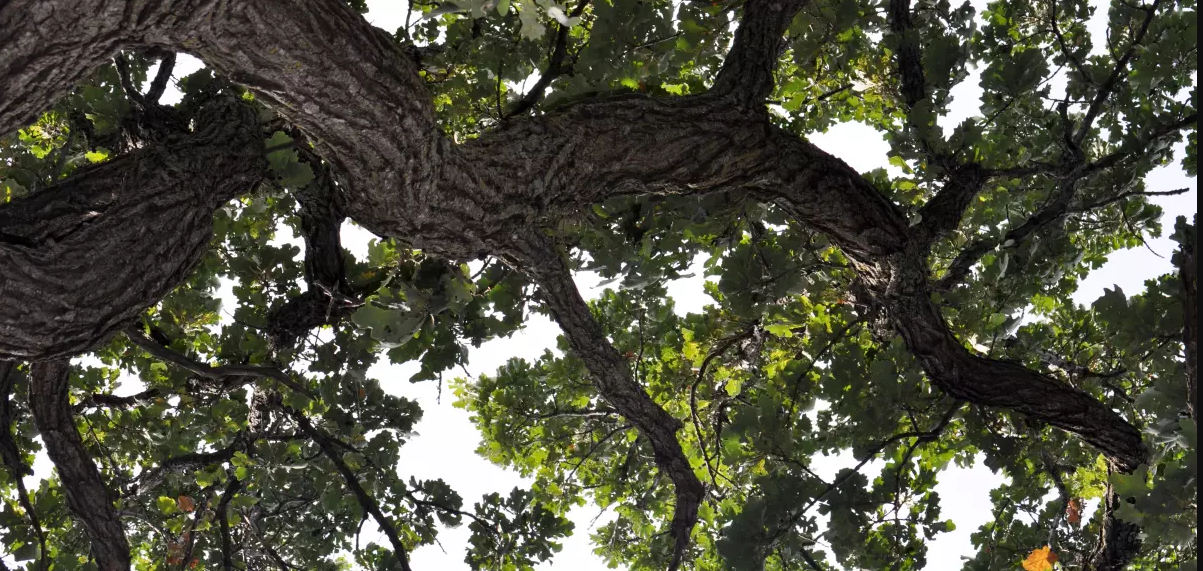
An oak (genus Quercus) canopy in the refuge on December 6, 2021.

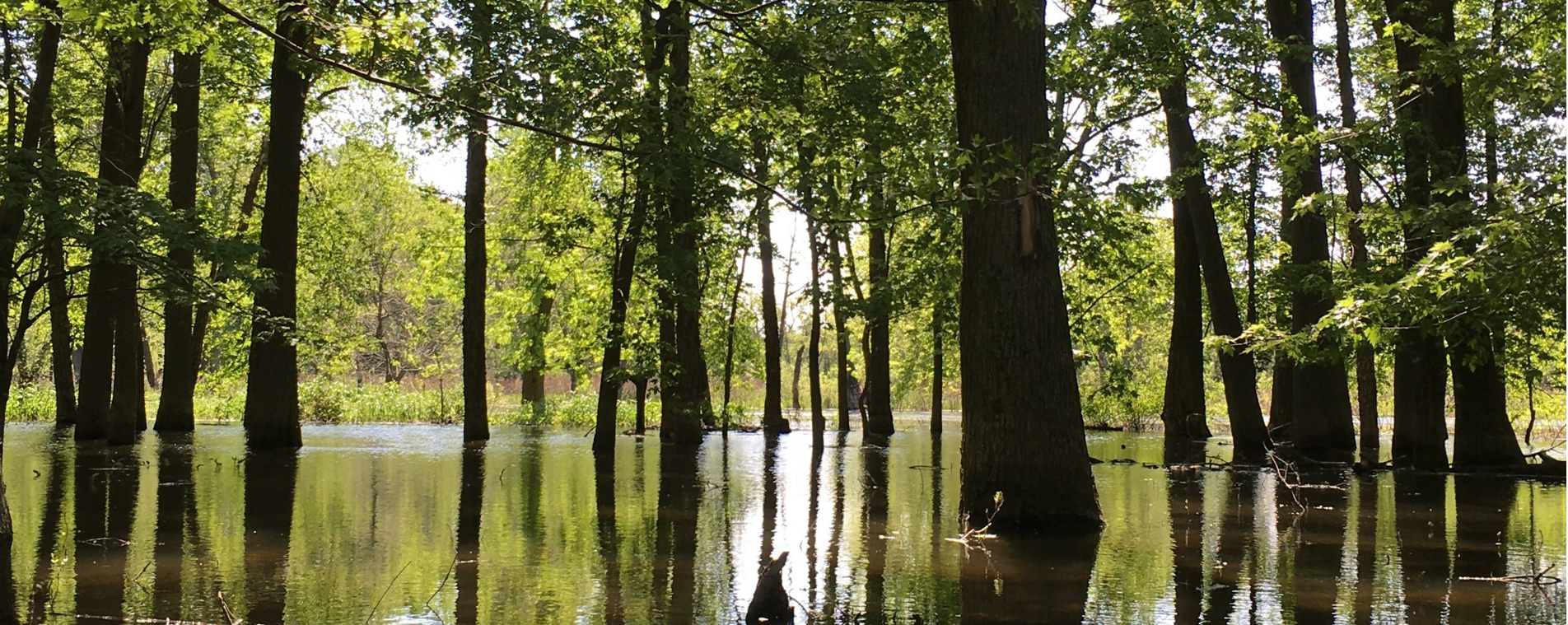
High water on the Kankakee River floods trees in the refuge on December 6, 2021.

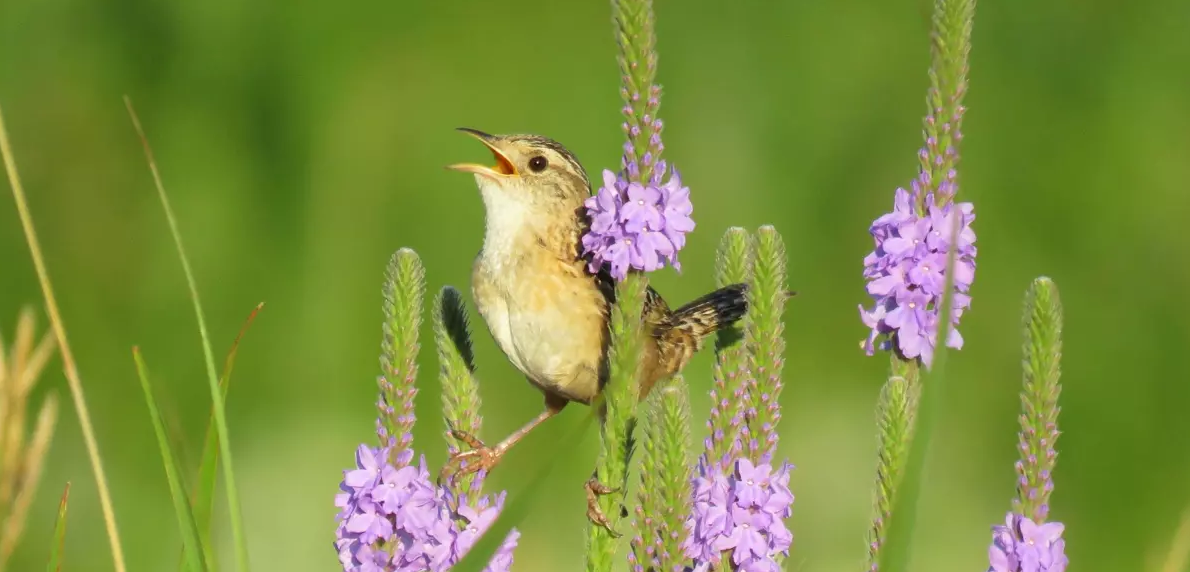
A sedge wren (Cistothorus stellaris) sings on a vervain (genus Verbena) in flower in a prairie habitat in the refuge on December 6, 2021.

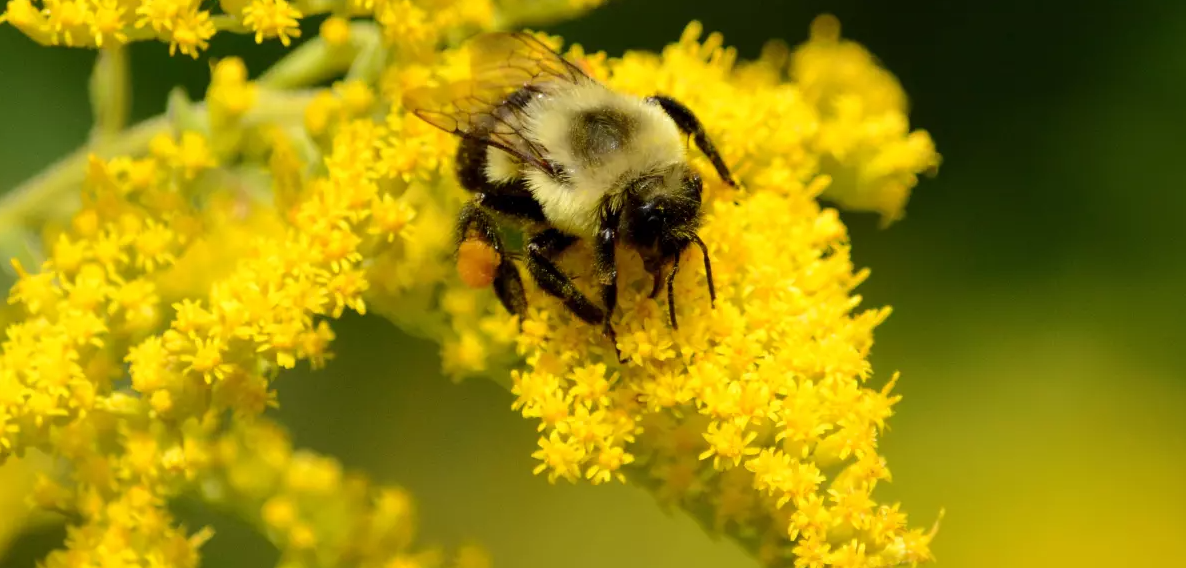
A bumblebee (genus Bombus) on a goldenrod (family Asteraceae) in the refuge on December 6, 2021.

The Kankakee National Wildlife Refuge and Conservation Area is a National Wildlife Refuge of the United States in Iroquois County, Illinois.

== Geography ==
The Kankakee National Wildlife Refuge and Conservation Area lies in the Kankakee River Basin in Iroquois County in northeastern Illinois. It covers an area of 66 acres (27 hectares). Its northern boundary runs along the border between Iroquois County and Kankakee County, Illinois, and its eastern boundary is just west of the Illinois-Indiana border.

== Flora and fauna ==
The Kankakee National Wildlife Refuge and Conservation Area consists of upland oak savanna, grasslands, wooded areas, and riparian wetlands, providing habitats for both resident and migratory wildlife. Migratory birds are most common in the refuge in the spring and fall. Resident species are most active in the late spring, summer, and early fall, generally around dawn and dusk.

The refuge lists 124 species of plants and animals that occur within its boundaries. It lists three species as its "featured" species: Black-crowned night heron (Nycticorax nycticorax) feed and rest in the area’s wetlands, rivers, and wet agricultural fields; red-headed woodpeckers (Melanerpes erythrocephalus), although rare elsewhere in the Midwestern United States, are more common in the refuge, where insects and nuts they eat abound; and the regal fritillary (Speyeria idalia) is a butterfly often found in the refuge’s larger open grasslands, wet fields, remnant tallgrass prairie, damp meadows, and marshes.

== History ==
In 1996, the United States Fish and Wildlife Service (USFWS) initiated a planning process to create a National Wildlife Refuge intended as a place for habitat restoration and the wildlife management of migratory birds, threatened and endangered species, and aquatic resources in the Kankakee River Basin in Illinois and Indiana. After detailed planning and public engagement, a final decision document was signed on June 23, 2000, authorizing the refuge, which was to be named the Greater Kankakee Marsh National Wildlife Refuge.

Thanks to a lack of funding and a focus on other priorities, the USFWS put the project on hold until 2012, when Governor of Illinois Pat Quinn asked it to resume work to establish the refuge. In discussions with partners and stakeholders in Indiana, the USFWS and the Government of Indiana came to a mutual agreement that the State of Indiana would take the lead on conservation in the Kankakee River Basin there, so the USFWS concentrated its renewed effort on focus areas (known as planning units) in Illinois.

In 2016, the Friends of Kankakee, a nonprofit group dedicated to the establishment of a National Wildlife Refuge in the Kankakee River Basin, donated a 66-acre (27 ha) parcel of land in Iroquois County, Illinois, to the USFWS. On May 25, 2016, the USFWS officially accepted the land and dedicated it as a National Wildlife Refuge, simultaneously renaming it the Kankakee National Wildlife Refuge and Conservation Area. The USFWS chose the new name to indicate the modernization of the original refuge concept by emphasizing the management of the lands as a public-private partnership that integrates conservation lands into the existing fabric of local communities and economies.

== Management ==
The USFWS manages the Kankakee National Wildlife Refuge and Conservation Area. It partners with the Government of Illinois, conservation organizations, local communities, neighboring landowners, and others to restore oak savanna, grassland habitats, and wetlands on public and private lands. The Friends of Kankakee is the refuge's primary non-profit support organization.

== Activities ==
The Kankakee National Wildlife Refuge and Conservation Area protects, restores, and manages ecological processes in the Kankakee River Basin in order to benefit many species of plants and animals, including threatened and endangered species, migratory birds, native fish, and a diverse population of flora and fauna. The refuge's staff uses controlled burns, grassland restoration, wetland restoration, woody plant control, and invasive species control techniques in managing the natural environment.

Invasive species the refuge targets include such non-native plants as European buckthorn (Rhamnus cathartica), honeysuckle (genus Lonicera), brome grass (genus Bromus), and purple loosestrife (Lythrum salicaria), which the refuge staff, contractors, or volunteers remove manually or destroy using controlled burns, biological control, chemical control, or other techniques. In place of these species, the refuge encourages the growth of plants that occur naturally in the Kankakee River Basin.

The refuge works with private landowners in Iroquois, Kankakee, and Ford counties who wish to restore and preserve natural habitats on their own land if they agree to maintain them for at least 10 years. During the summer, the refuge works with a community partner to host a Youth Conservation Corps crew of high school students who gain work experience and job skills by conducting conservation activities in the refuge. The refuge also provides the public with wildlife-dependent environmental education, interpretation, and recreation experiences designed to improve and expand the public's understanding and appreciation of natural resources and the role of humans in their stewardship.

== Recreation ==
The Kolar Savanna Unit of the Kankakee National Wildlife Refuge and Conservation Area is open to visitors daily from 30 minutes before sunrise until 30 minutes after sunset and offers visitors access to the woodlands and grasslands of an oak savanna environment and wildlife-dependent recreation opportunities free of charge. The most popular activities are wildlife observation and birdwatching, wildlife photography, deer hunting, and turkey hunting. No fishing or camping is permitted. There are no facilities for the use of visitors in the refuge except for a visitor information kiosk in the Kolar Savanna Unit's parking lot.

The Kolar Savanna Trail is a loop trail that begins and ends at the Kolar Savanna Unit parking lot and is 0.68 mile (1.1 km) long. It winds through prairie, sand flatwoods, and oak savanna. It is open to the public year-round, and is suitable for walking in the spring, summer, and fall and for snowshoeing and cross-country skiing in the winter. Bicycling, horseback riding, and motor vehicles are prohibited on the trail.
