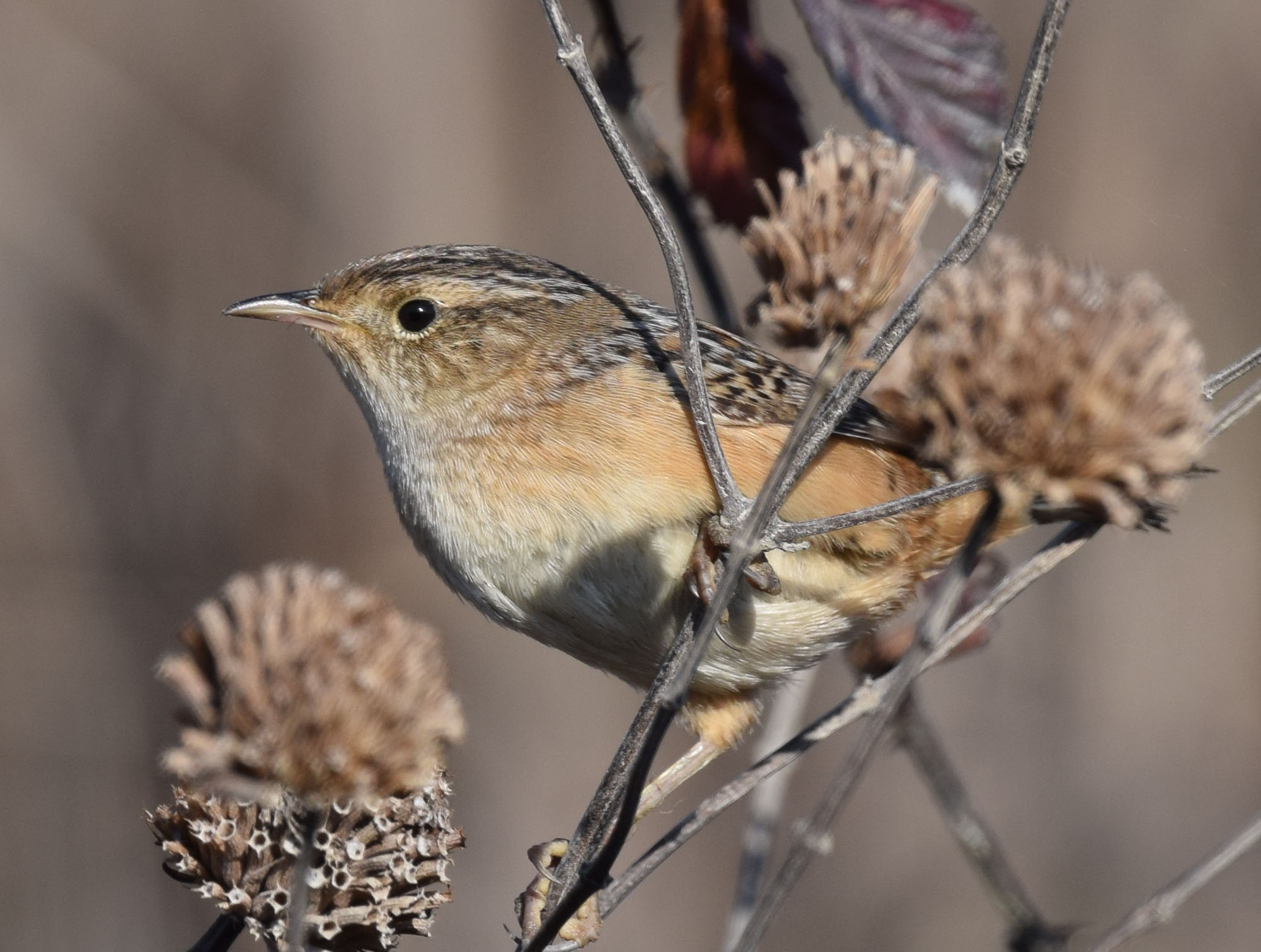
- In Prairie State Park, Missouri

Conservation status
- Least Concern (IUCN 3.1)

Scientific classification
- Kingdom: Animalia
- Phylum: Chordata
- Class: Aves
- Order: Passeriformes
- Family: Troglodytidae
- Genus: Cistothorus
- Species: C. stellaris

Binomial name
- Cistothorus stellaris (Naumann, J.F., 1823)
- Range Breeding Migration Nonbreeding

= Sedge wren =

Species of bird

The sedge wren (Cistothorus stellaris) is a small and secretive passerine bird in the family Troglodytidae. It is widely distributed in North America. It is often found in wet grasslands and meadows where it nests in the tall grasses and sedges and feeds on insects. The sedge wren was formerly considered as conspecific with the non-migratory grass wren of central and South America.

== Taxonomy ==
The sedge wren was described by the German ornithologist Johann Friedrich Naumann in 1823 under the binomial name Troglodytes stellaris. The type locality is Carolina. The current genus Cistothorus was introduced by the German ornithologist Jean Cabanis in 1850. The sedge wren and the grass wren were formerly treated as conspecific. They were split based on the results of a molecular phylogenetic study published in 2014. The sedge wren is monotypic.

The sedge wren was formerly known as the short-billed marsh wren but was renamed to better distinguish it from the marsh wren.

== Description ==
The sedge wren is a relatively small wren that measures 10 to 12 cm (3.9 to 4.7 in), weighs 7 to 10 g (0.25 to 0.35 oz) and has a wing-chord of 4.1 to 4.6 cm (1.6 to 1.8 in). Wingspan ranges from 4.7 to 5.5 in (12-14 cm).

Females and males have the same plumage but males are slightly larger. Their head and back are tawny brown streaked with black and white. They have a pale buff supercilium and brown irises. Their rump is orange and tail is tawny brown bared with black. Wings are tawny brown bared with black, white and pale buff. They have a white throat and belly with pale buff on the side. Their beak is long and slender. and measures on average 6.77 to 6.95 mm The upper mandible of the beak is brown while the lower mandible is yellow. They have pink legs and feet. Juveniles are overall similar to adults but have less streaking on the head and nape and their chest is paler than adults. The sedge wren can be differentiated from the similar marsh wren (Cistothorus palustris) by its smaller size, streaked crown and different song.

== Distribution and habitat ==
=== Distribution ===
During the breeding season they are found in the southern half of Alberta and Saskatchewan and in southern Ontario and Quebec in Canada and in the United States, west of the Appalachians, from the Canadian border to Missouri and northern Arkansas. During migration and winter they are found from the southern half of Arkansas down to Texas and Florida.

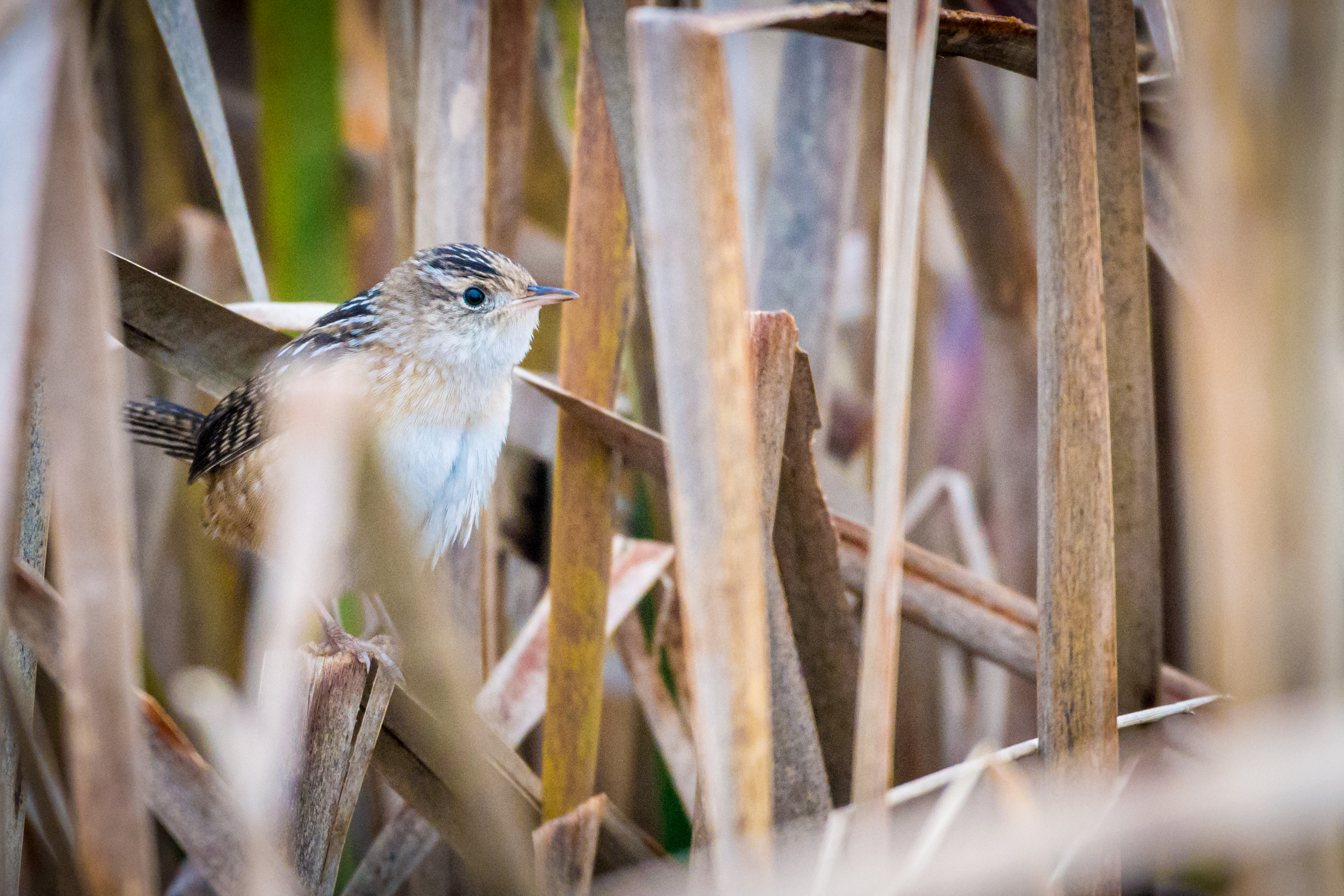
Sedge wren in tall vegetation

=== Habitat ===
During the breeding season, sedge wrens generally occupy meadows and wet grasslands. They can however live in wetter areas such as marshes and drier habitat such as dry prairies. They prefer areas with dense and tall grasses and sedges to build their nests.

During winter, migratory sedge wrens can be found in a variety of habitat as long as there are sufficient insects to eat. For example, they can be found in pine savannas, dry prairies, meadows, marshes, and bogs.

== Behavior ==
=== Vocalizations ===
Songs usually last 1.5 to 2 seconds and start with 3 to 4 high notes or staccato chips followed by a series of thrills. While both male and females can produce calls, only the males sing. Males sing from late winter to early spring on non-breeding grounds and throughout the breeding season to attract mates. They sing both during the day and the night. While males usually sing to attract females, they can also engage in countersinging, where a male will respond to another male's song. A male will usually answer the other male with a different song type and frequently change song types during the interaction. Both males also usually sing faster during countersinging. It is hypothesized that they do so to send the maximum amount of stimuli to the listener whether it be a male or a potential mate.

==== Improvisation ====
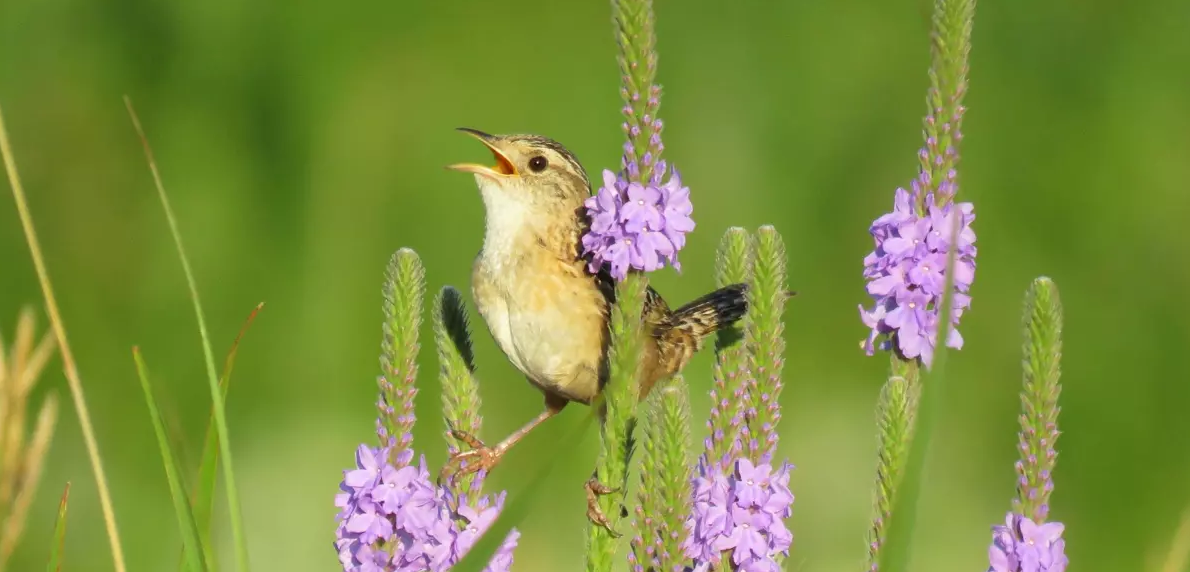
A sedge wren signs on a blooming vervain (genus Verbena) in the Kankakee National Wildlife Refuge and Conservation Area in Illinois.

Sedge wrens improvise their songs rather than learning them from other birds. Lab and field observations demonstrated that males had large ranges of individually unique songs and that their songs were poor imitations of the same template songs. There was also very little song sharing among males. This large variation results from the tendency of North American sedge wrens to move often. North American sedge wrens are nomadic breeders compared to their sedentary central and South American relatives. They breed where moist meadows and grasslands are available and they may not return to the same locations the next year if conditions are not right. Furthermore, adult birds may switch locations after raising their first brood to go to wetter areas. There is thus a lot of movement and mixing of populations and birds rarely have the same neighbor twice. Therefore, there is no selection for a precise imitation of the neighboring birds and variations arise in the males' songs. Moreover, because their songs vary so much naturally, it decreases the overall variation over large geographic scales and wrens from all over North America can communicate with each other regardless of which population they came from.

=== Diet ===
Sedge wren forage on the ground for insects and spiders. They eat many types of insects such as moths, flies and grasshoppers.

=== Migration ===
Sedge wrens are short-distance and nocturnal migrants. They leave their wintering grounds between early April and mid-May and usually arrive at their breeding grounds between mid-April and mid-May. They will typically leave their breeding grounds when frost reduces significantly the abundance of insects. They depart anywhere from August in the northern part of their range to the end of October in the central states to arrive in their wintering grounds starting in early September.

==== Dual breeding migration ====
There is some evidence that some sedge wrens may go through a second migration during the breeding season to breed at a second location. Sedge wrens were observed arriving and breeding from mid to late summer in the Central Plains of the United States and in Iowa where they were previously absent in early summer. It is however not actually known if these birds bred somewhere else before. There are several hypotheses to explain this potential second migration. One hypothesis is that these birds are coming from the northern part of their range where shorter summers prevents them from having a second brood in the same location. Another similar hypothesis is that these birds come from various locations where the environmental conditions changed and were no longer suitable for raising a second brood. A final hypothesis is that males that were not able to breed at their previous location relocate to the central plains. They will then wait for the arrival of females that are relocating and try to breed with them.

=== Reproduction ===
Some males are polygynous while others are monogamous. Polygynous males are usually more successful than monogamous males because breeding with multiple females increases their number of offspring. Males arrive earlier than females at breeding sites to establish territories and the ones defending territories with more nesting sites and food usually attract more females. Males are also the ones building the nests. They build multiple nests which serve for nesting, as dormitories and as decoys for predators. The females will then add a lining of grass, sedge and feathers to the nest she chooses. Nests are round globes of dried grass with a round opening on the side. They are usually built in grasses and sedges about one or two feet above ground or shallow water. Females usually lay seven eggs but it can vary from one to ten eggs which she incubates for 12–16 days. The eggs are oval shaped with no markings and measure on average 16 by 12 mm (0.63 by 0.47 in). The young hatchlings are altricial. The females do most of the parental care and feeding whilst the males continue to build nests and display for other females. However, males will also occasionally feed the young. The young leave the nest after 11–16 days. Some early breeding females can also have a second brood later in the season.
