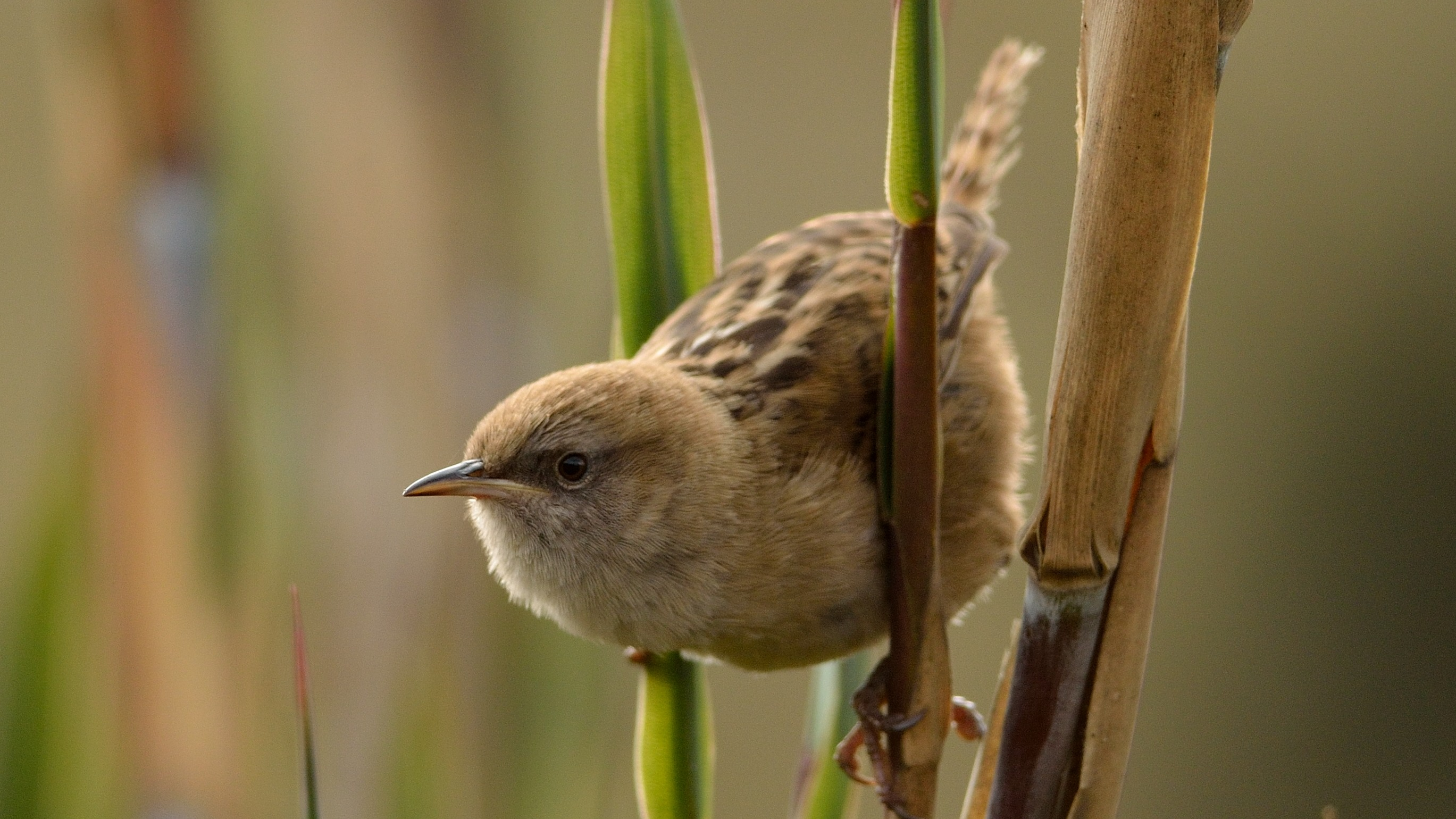

Conservation status
- Endangered (IUCN 3.1)

Scientific classification
- Kingdom: Animalia
- Phylum: Chordata
- Class: Aves
- Order: Passeriformes
- Family: Troglodytidae
- Genus: Cistothorus
- Species: C. apolinari

Binomial name
- Cistothorus apolinari Chapman, 1914

= Apolinar's wren =

Species of bird

Apolinar's wren (Cistothorus apolinari) is a passerine bird in the family Troglodytidae. It is endemic to Colombia.

== Taxonomy and systematics ==
Apolinar's wren has two subspecies, the nominate Cistothorus apolinari apolinari and C. a. hernandezi. The latter was described in 2002 and has been suggested to be a separate species. Apolinar's wren, grass wren (C. platensis), and Mérida wren (C. meridae) form a superspecies.

The common and scientific names of Apolinar's wren commemorate the Colombian monk Brother Apolinar Maria (1877–1949) who was also an ornithologist. Its Spanish common name is cucarachero de pantano (literally, swamp cockroach hunter).

== Description ==
Apolinar's wren is 12 cm (4.7 in) long. A male C. a. hernandezi weighed 17.7 g (0.62 oz). Nominate adults have a chestnut crown, blackish brown shoulders and upper back with whitish buff streaks, and bright reddish brown lower back and rump. Their tails are reddish with blackish brown barring. They have a faint supercilium that is a bit lighter than the rest of the gray-brown face. Their underparts are buff-brown that is lighter on the throat and more reddish on the lower flanks. The juvenile's head is dark gray-brown with no supercilium, a buff nape, and less streaking on the back than the adult.

C. a. hernandezi is much more whitish on its underparts than the nominate, rather than buffy. It wings are longer, its tail shorter, and its bill both heavier and longer.

== Distribution and habitat ==
The nominate Apolinar's wren is found in the Andes of Colombia's Cundinamarca and Boyacá Departments. It inhabits marshes and lake-edge vegetation, especially those with Typha cattails and Scirpus bullrushes. In elevation it is generally found between 2,500 and 3,000 m (8,200 and 9,800 ft) though it also occurs at one site with an elevation of 3,015 m (9,892 ft).

C. a. hernandezi is restricted to the Sumapaz Massif, south of Bogotá in Cundinamarca. It inhabits very different terrain, boggy páramo at elevations between 3,800 and 3,900 m (12,500 and 12,800 ft). It favors páramo with the shrubs Diplostephium revolutum or Espeletia grandiflora and requires Chusquea tessellata dwarf bamboo for nesting.

== Behavior ==
=== Feeding ===
Apolinar's wren forages by climbing up vegetation stems and then dropping to near ground or water level. The nominate appears to feed primarily on Chironomus midges but also spiders and other adult and larval insects. C. a. hernandezi appears to also feed on insects but details have not been published.

=== Breeding ===
The nominate Apolinar's wren appears to breed between February or March and October and might double-brood. It also might breed in loose colonies. One nest was a ball constructed of strips of Typha leaves and placed in a thick Typha stand. The nests are known to be parasitized by shiny cowbirds (Molothrus bonariensis).

C. a. hernandezi is a cooperative breeder, though a group has only one breeding pair. Up to 10 individuals defend the nest and otherwise participate in the breeding cycle. The nest is a sphere of coarse grass lined with softer leaves and has a side entrance.

=== Vocalization ===
The nominate male's song is "a series of rising and falling churrs mixed with harsh gravelly notes" and it may have six or seven variations on it . C. a. hernandezi has at least 11 song types; females also sing and both may sing in duet .

== Status ==
The IUCN has assessed Apolinar's wren as Endangered. "This species has a very small population and range. It is thought to be declining rapidly, owing to loss and degradation of its severely fragmented habitat. All subpopulations are suspected to be extremely small, and some have been extirpated over the last few decades."
