= Mérida wren =

Conservation status
- Least Concern (IUCN 3.1)

Scientific classification
- Kingdom: Animalia
- Phylum: Chordata
- Class: Aves
- Order: Passeriformes
- Family: Troglodytidae
- Genus: Cistothorus
- Species: C. meridae

Binomial name
- Cistothorus meridae Hellmayr, 1907

Species of bird

The Mérida wren (Cistothorus meridae), or paramo wren, is a species of bird in the family Troglodytidae. It is endemic to Venezuela.

== Taxonomy and systematics ==
The Mérida wren is monotypic. Apolinar's wren (C. apolinari), grass wren (C. platensis), and it form a superspecies.

== Description ==
The Mérida wren is 10 cm (3.9 in) long. Adults have a medium brown crown and nape with darker brown streaks, blackish brown shoulders and upper back with off-white streaks, and a blackish and brown streaked rump. Their tail is medium brown with crisp black bars. They have an off-white supercilium that is wider to the rear, cheeks mottled with brown, and off-white chin and throat. Their chest is buffy and the flanks a darker buff.

== Distribution and habitat ==
The Mérida wren is found in the Andes of Venezuela from Trujillo south to northeastern Táchira. It inhabits wet páramo with scattered bushes at elevations between 3,000 and 4,100 m (9,800 and 13,500 ft). It is mostly sedentary but may move altitudinally and is thought to leave some areas during the rainy season.

== Behavior ==
=== Feeding ===
The Mérida wren forages low in the vegetation for arthropods; no details have been published.

=== Breeding ===
Very little is known about the Mérida wren's breeding phenology. It is polygamous and uses "dormitory" nests for roosting but not breeding.

=== Vocalization ===
The male Mérida wren has a repertoire of 20 to 25 songs that vary geographically and even among individuals in a region. Some examples are , , and .

== Status ==
The IUCN has assessed the Mérida wren as being of Least Concern. "Despite its small global range, the harsh nature of its habitat does not invite much human interference. Some areas of its range are protected."
