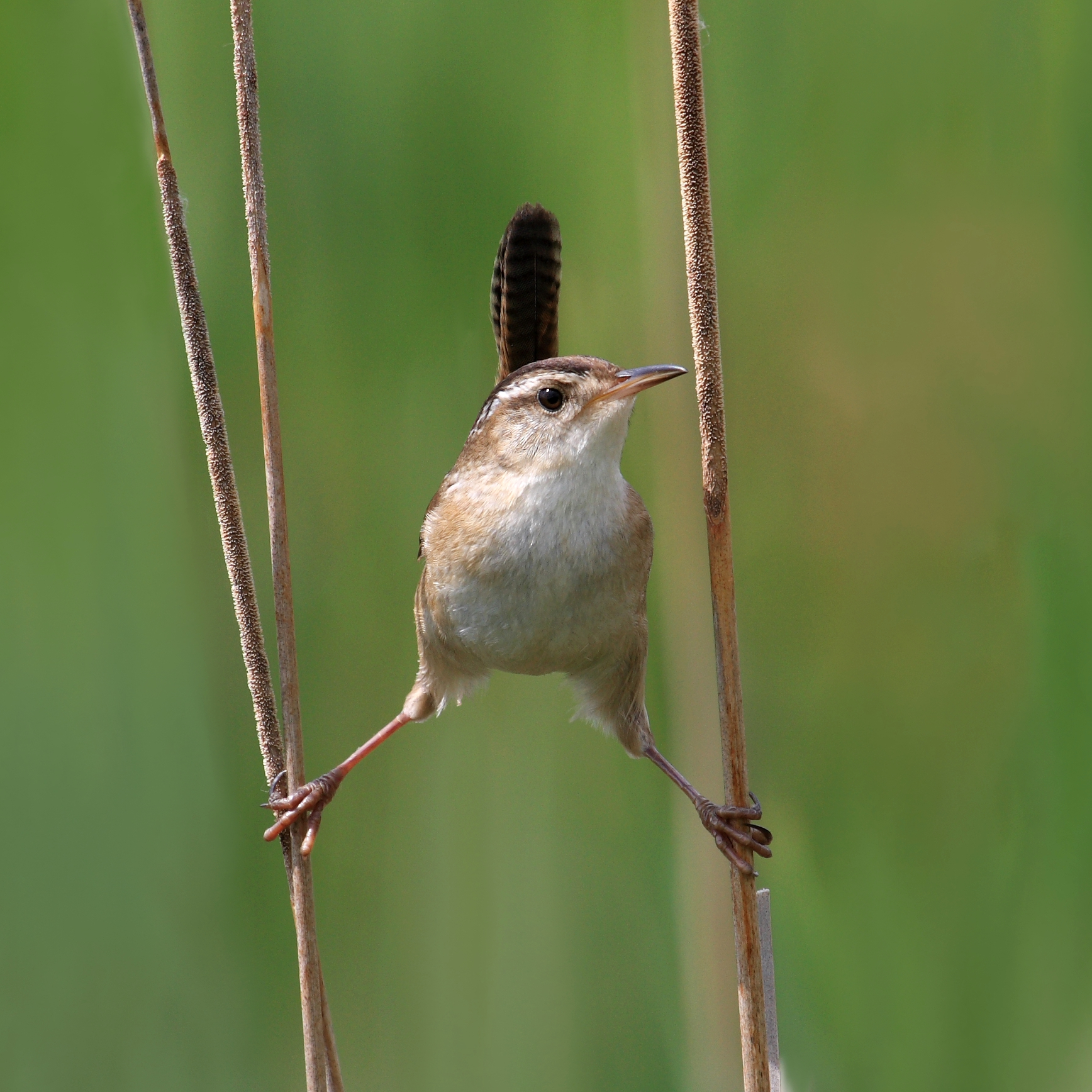
- Marsh wren (Cistothorus palustris)

Scientific classification
- Kingdom: Animalia
- Phylum: Chordata
- Class: Aves
- Order: Passeriformes
- Family: Troglodytidae
- Genus: Cistothorus; Cabanis, 1851

Type species
- Troglodytes stellaris Naumann, J.F., 1823

Species
- See text

= Cistothorus =

Genus of birds

Cistothorus is a genus of small passerine birds in the wren family. The name Cistothorus is from the Ancient Greek words κιστος (kistos), meaning "bush", and θουρος (thouros), meaning "leaping" or "running through".

== Taxonomy ==
The genus Cistothorus was circumscribed by the German ornithologist Jean Cabanis in 1850. (Note: Some authorities list the year of publication as 1851.) The type species is the sedge wren (Cistothorus stellaris).

=== Species ===
The genus contains five species:

- Sedge wren, Cistothorus stellaris – northern Mexico, United States and southern Canada
- Mérida wren, Cistothorus meridae – Venezuelan Andes
- Apolinar's wren, Cistothorus apolinari – Colombian Andes
- Grass wren, Cistothorus platensis – central and South America
- Marsh wren, Cistothorus palustris – Mexico, United States and southern Canada

The sedge wren and the grass wren were formerly treated as conspecific. They were split based on the results of a molecular phylogenetic study published in 2014.
