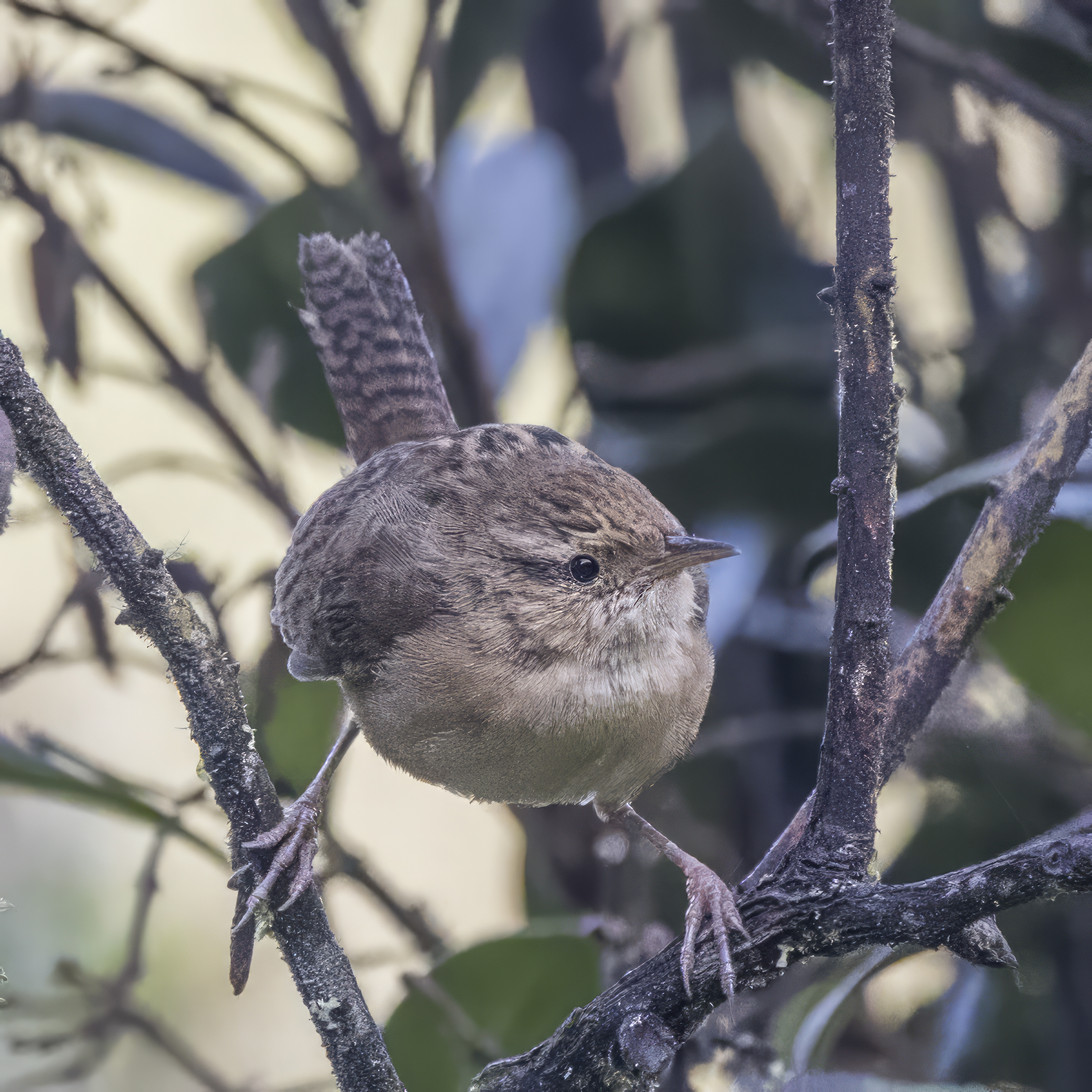
- C. p. aequatorialis, Colombia

Conservation status
- Least Concern (IUCN 3.1)

Scientific classification
- Kingdom: Animalia
- Phylum: Chordata
- Class: Aves
- Order: Passeriformes
- Family: Troglodytidae
- Genus: Cistothorus
- Species: C. platensis

Binomial name
- Cistothorus platensis (Latham, 1790)

= Grass wren =

Species of bird

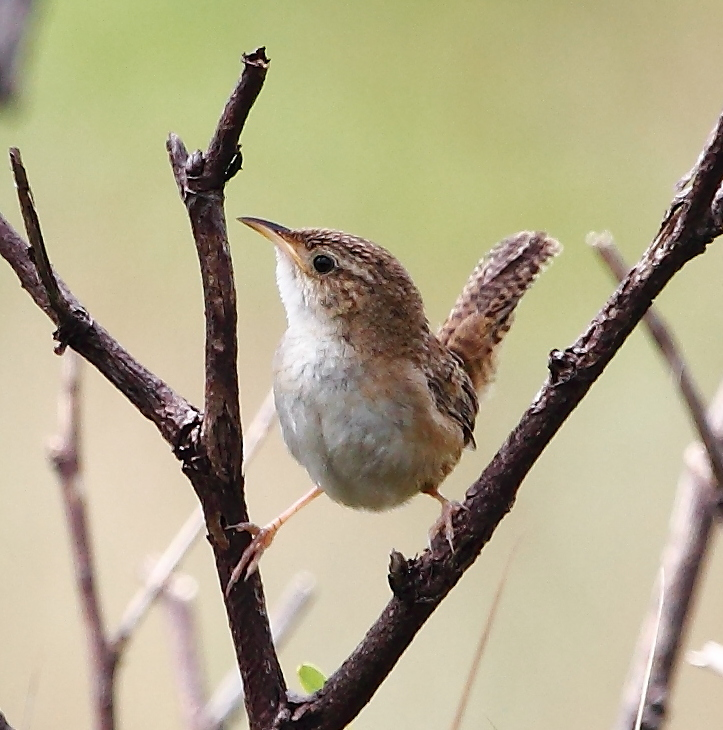
C. p. polyglottus Serra da Canastra National Park, Brasil

The grass wren (Cistothorus platensis) is a species of passerine bird in the family Troglodytidae. It is widely distributed in central and southern America.

== Taxonomy and systematics ==
The grass wren was described in 1790 by the English ornithologist John Latham and given the binomial name Sylvia platensis. The type locality is Buenos Aires, Argentina. The current genus Cistothorus was introduced by the German ornithologist Jean Cabanis in 1850.

The grass wren and the sedge wren (Cistothorus stellaris) were formerly treated as conspecific. They were split based on the results of a molecular phylogenetic study published in 2014. This split was accepted in 2018 by the International Ornithological Committee (IOC) and BirdLife International's Handbook of the Birds of the World, in 2019 by the South American Classification Committee of the American Ornithological Society (AOS), and in 2021 by the AOS North American Classification Committee and the Clements taxonomy. As of 2018 the fourth edition of the Howard and Moore Complete Checklist of the Birds of the World had not implemented the split. Taxonomic bodies recognize 17 subspecies of the grass wren.

== Description ==
The grass wren is 10 to 10.5 cm (3.9 to 4.1 in) long. Its upperparts are buffy brown with black and buffy whitish streaks on the back. The wings and tail have dusky bands. Its underparts are mostly buffy.

== Distribution and habitat ==
The grass wren is found discontinuously from central Mexico south through Belize, Guatemala, Honduras, and Nicaragua into Costa Rica, in every mainland South American country except French Guiana and Suriname, and the Falkland Islands.

In Colombia and Ecuador, the grass wren inhabits moist grassy and sedgy parts of paramo, clearings, agricultural areas, and interandean valleys. In Brazil it inhabits cerrado, grassland, and marshes.

== Behavior ==
=== Non-breeding ===
Grass wrens build two types of non‐breeding nest structures: platforms and dummy nests. Platforms are rudimentary accumulations of grasses concealed between vegetation. Dummy and breeding nests are dome‐shaped with a similar structural layer. The function of these non-breeding nests is unclear, but an experimental study suggests that building non‐breeding nests may be an attempt by males to manipulate the decision of females to breed with a mate they might otherwise reject or to start reproduction earlier than optimal for the females.

=== Vocalization ===
The grass wren's song is a "series of short,...high notes such as high rattles, sharp trills, sparrowlike 'tr-tr-tr-tr' and nasal 'zèzèzèzè'."

== Status ==
The IUCN has assessed the grass wren as being of Least Concern.
