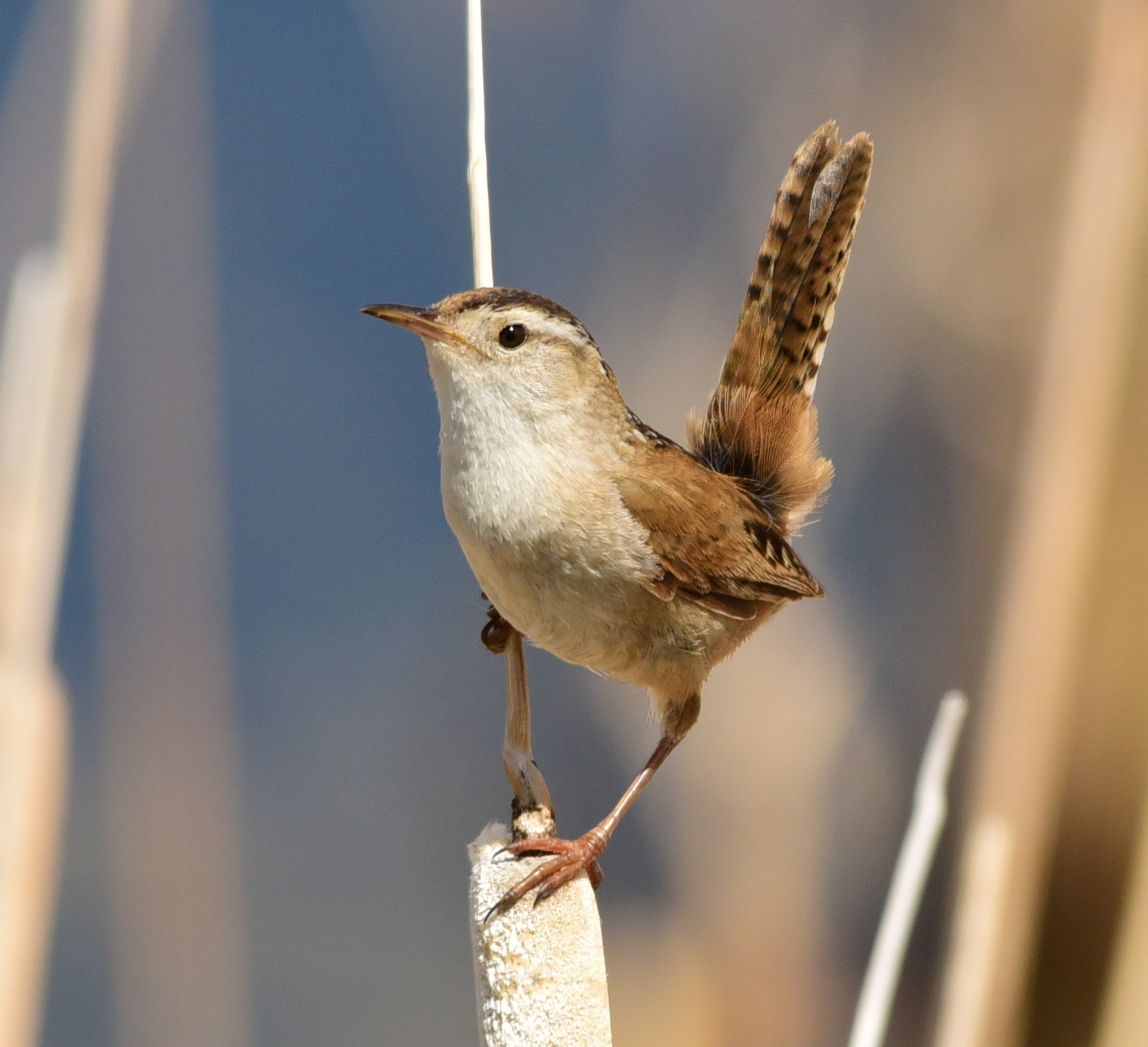
- At Seedskadee National Wildlife Refuge, Wyoming
- Singing in Typha marsh in Minnesota

Conservation status
- Least Concern (IUCN 3.1)

Scientific classification
- Kingdom: Animalia
- Phylum: Chordata
- Class: Aves
- Order: Passeriformes
- Family: Troglodytidae
- Genus: Cistothorus
- Species: C. palustris

Binomial name
- Cistothorus palustris (Wilson, A, 1810)
- Distribution map Breeding Migration Resident Non-breeding

Synonyms
- Telmatodytes palustris

= Marsh wren =

Species of bird

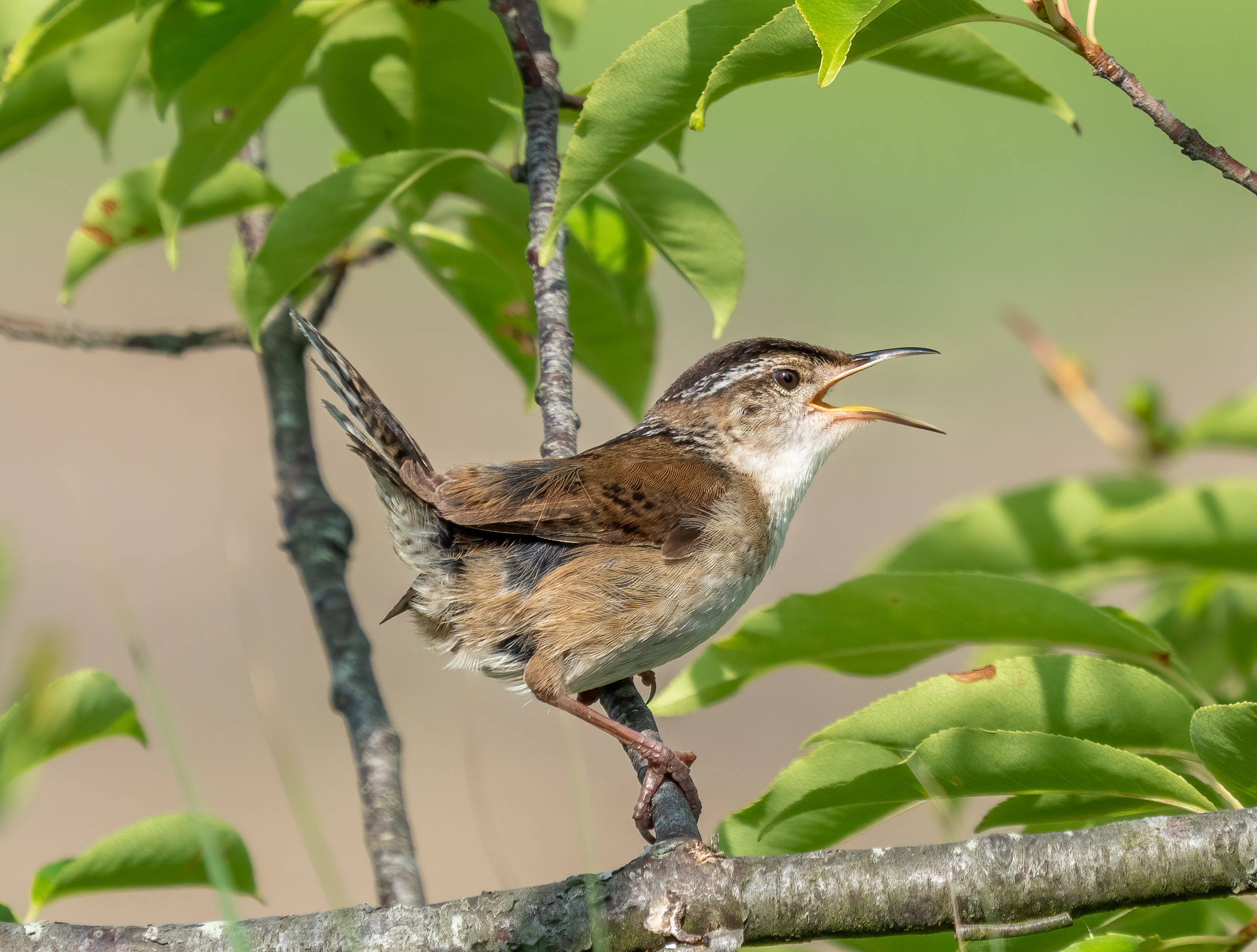
Singing in a marsh at Hammonasset Beach, Connecticut

The eastern marsh wren or marsh wren (Cistothorus palustris) is a small North American songbird of the wren family. It was formerly called the long-billed marsh wren to distinguish it from the sedge wren, then known as the short-billed marsh wren.

== Taxonomy ==
The marsh wren was described by the Scottish-American ornithologist Alexander Wilson in 1810 and given the binomial name Certhia palustris. The current genus Cistothorus was introduced by the German ornithologist Jean Cabanis in 1850. There are 15 recognised subspecies.

Etymology: from Greek 'κιστος' (cistos, "a shrub") and 'θουρος' (thouros, "leaping, or running through") and Latin 'palustris' ("marshy").

As of October 20, 2026, the American Ornithological Society passed a proposal to split the species, based on vocalization and genetic differences, into the eastern marsh wren (C. palustris) and the western marsh wren (C. paludicola).

== Description ==
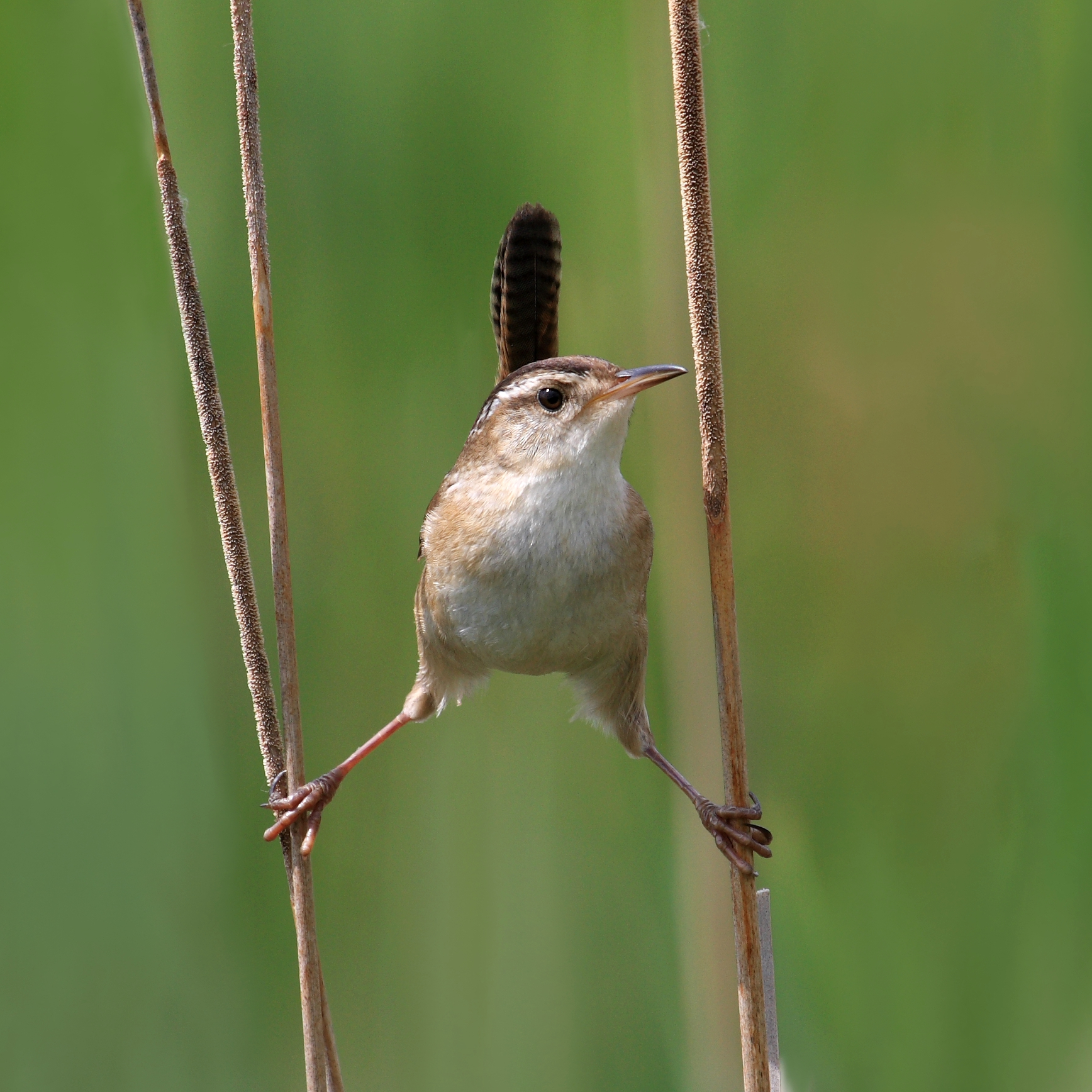
Cap Tourmente National Wildlife Area, Quebec, Canada

Adults have brown upperparts with a light brown belly and flanks and a white throat and breast. The back is black with white stripes. They have a dark cap with a white line over the eyes and a short thin bill.

The male's song is a loud gurgle used to declare ownership of territory; western males have a more varied repertoire.

This little bird is native to Canada, Mexico, and the United States. Their breeding habitat is marshes with tall vegetation such as cattails across North America. In the western United States, some birds are permanent residents. Other birds migrate to marshes and salt marshes in the southern United States and Mexico. Their non-breeding range is in the southern United States going into Mexico and their breeding range is in the northeastern United States going into Canada.

Measurements:

- Length: 3.9–5.5 in (9.9–14.0 cm)
- Weight: 0.3–0.5 oz (8.5–14.2 g)
- Wingspan: 5.9 inches (15 cm)

== Foraging and diet ==
These birds forage actively in vegetation close to the water, occasionally flying up to catch insects in flight. They mainly eat insects, also spiders and snails. In California, 53 Western Marsh Wren stomachs were examined which showed that the birds consume bugs (29%), caterpillars and chrysalids (17%), beetles (16%), ants and wasps (8%), spiders (5%), carabids and coccinellids (2%), with various other flies, grasshoppers, dragonflies and unidentifiable insect remains making up over 11 percent. Ants and wasps were observed to be mostly eaten in the fall.

== Nesting ==
The nest is an oval structure attached to marsh vegetation, entered from the side. The male builds many unused nests in his territory. A hypothesis of the possible reason to why males build multiple "dummy" nests in their territory is that they are courting areas and that the females construct the "breeding nest" in which she lays her eggs. He may puncture the eggs and fatally peck the nestlings of other birds nesting nearby, including his own species (even his own offspring) and red-winged blackbirds, yellow-headed blackbirds, and least bitterns. Likely because of this, marsh wren eggs are able to withstand pressure 2.9 times higher than expected when compared to eggs from other passerine species. The clutch is normally four to six eggs, though the number can range from three to 10. The eggs are usually 0.6-0.7 inches in length and 0.4-0.6 inches in width. Incubation is performed only by females, and only females develop a brood patch. Marsh wren young can get infected by pathogenic larvae. The Blowfly larvae infect the young by subdermal myiasis-induced lesions and subsequent sepsis. The larvae form a wound in the young by rasping and expanding a hole in their skin to create blood flow and feed on the blood of the hosts' body.

Abandoned marsh wren nests may also be used by other animals, including meadow jumping mouse.

== Habitat ==
The marsh wren prefers areas with vegetation that tends to be uniform in composition, as well as fairly tall.

== Conservation ==
The species is still common with an estimated global breeding population of 9.4 million. However, its numbers have declined with the loss of suitable wetland habitat and wholesale draining of marshes will lead to local extinction. Still, the species is widespread enough not to qualify as threatened according to the IUCN.

== Gallery ==
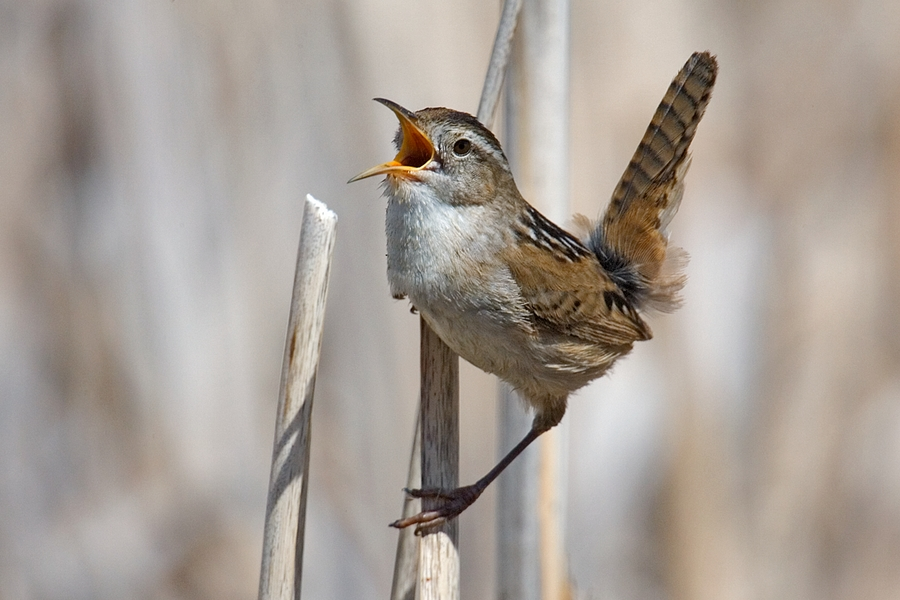
Marsh wren at Tule Lake National Wildlife Refuge, California

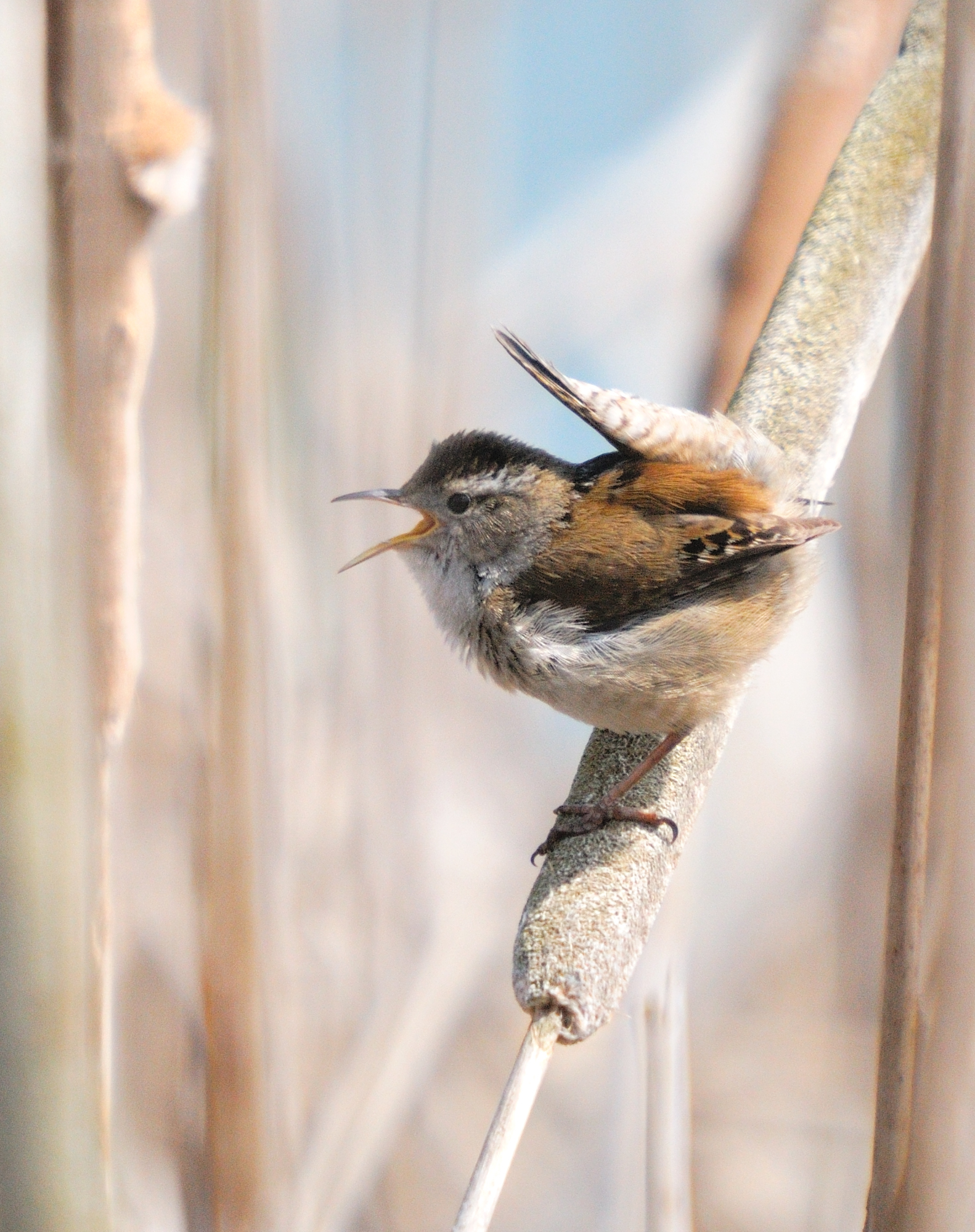
In Iona, British Columbia, Canada

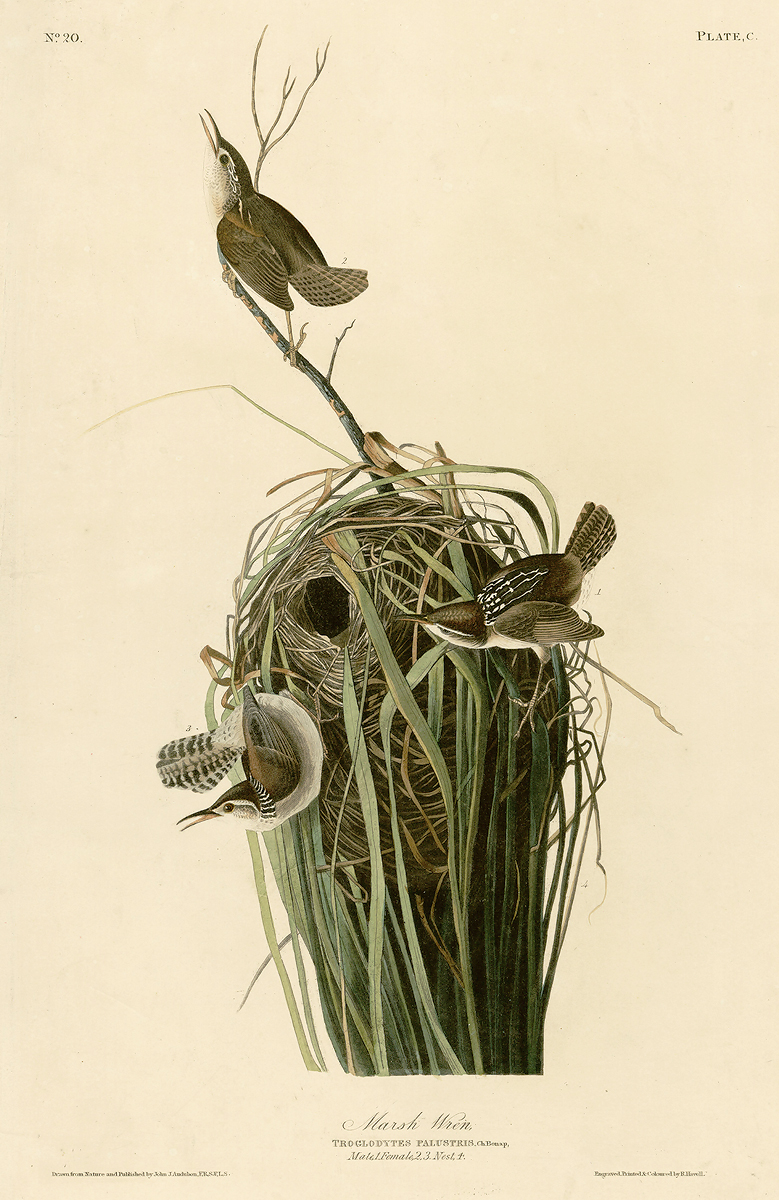
Nest, illustration

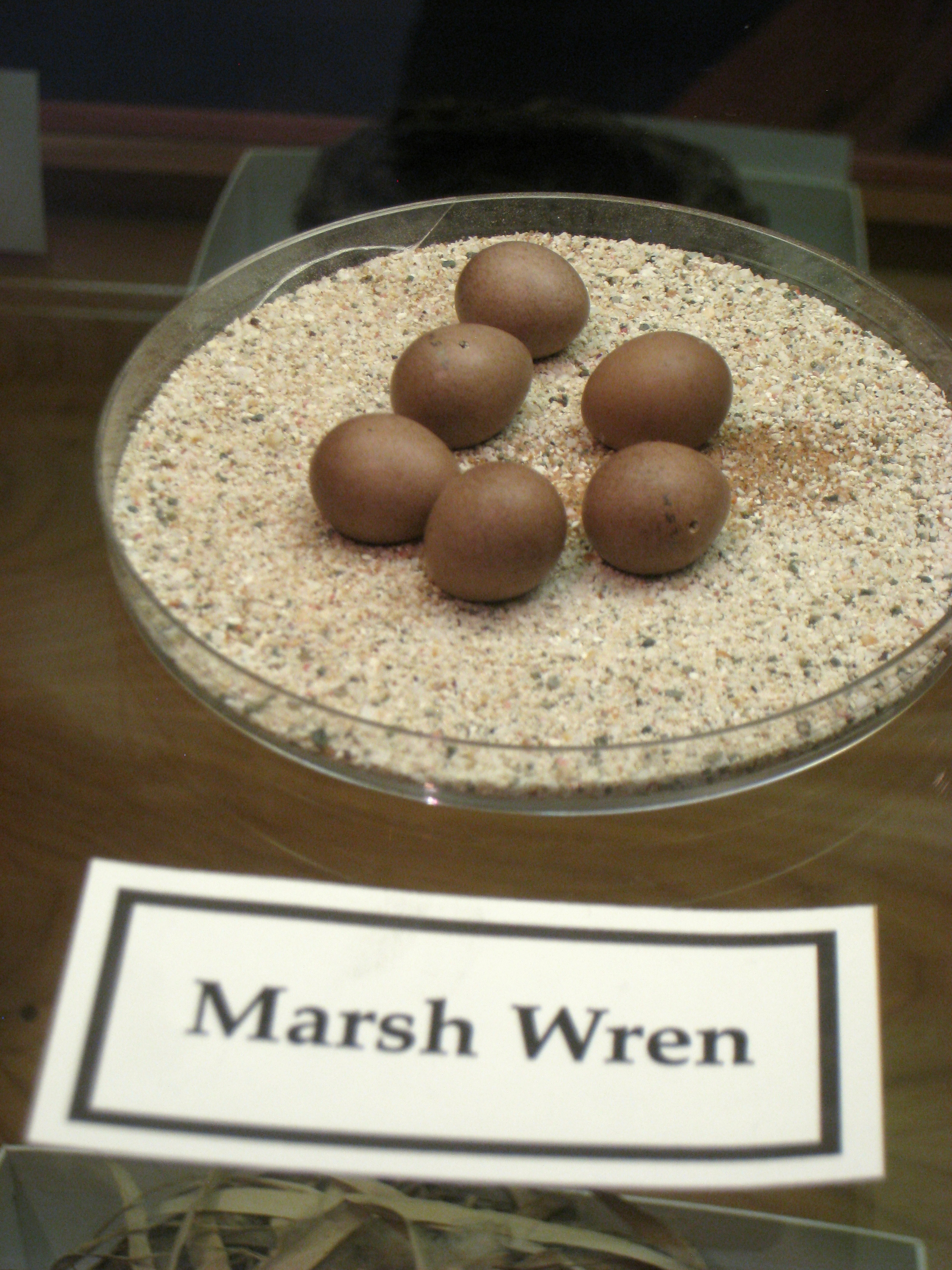
Eggs
