= Chemical control =

Chemical control may refer to:

- Any method to eradicate or limit the growth of pathogens which transmit disease to animals and plants, especially:
  - Herbicides
  - Insecticides
  - Fungicides
- In molecular biology, the use of biochemicals to control physiological functions such as breathing and molecular events such as receptor signaling

== See also ==
- Regulation of chemicals
