= Kankakee, Indiana =

Unincorporated community in Indiana, U.S.

Coordinates: 41°30′30″N 86°32′22″W

Kankakee was an unincorporated community in LaPorte County, Indiana, in the United States. It took its name from the nearby Kankakee River.

Never much more than a railroad whistle-stop, nothing remains of the Johnson Township settlement called Kankakee.
