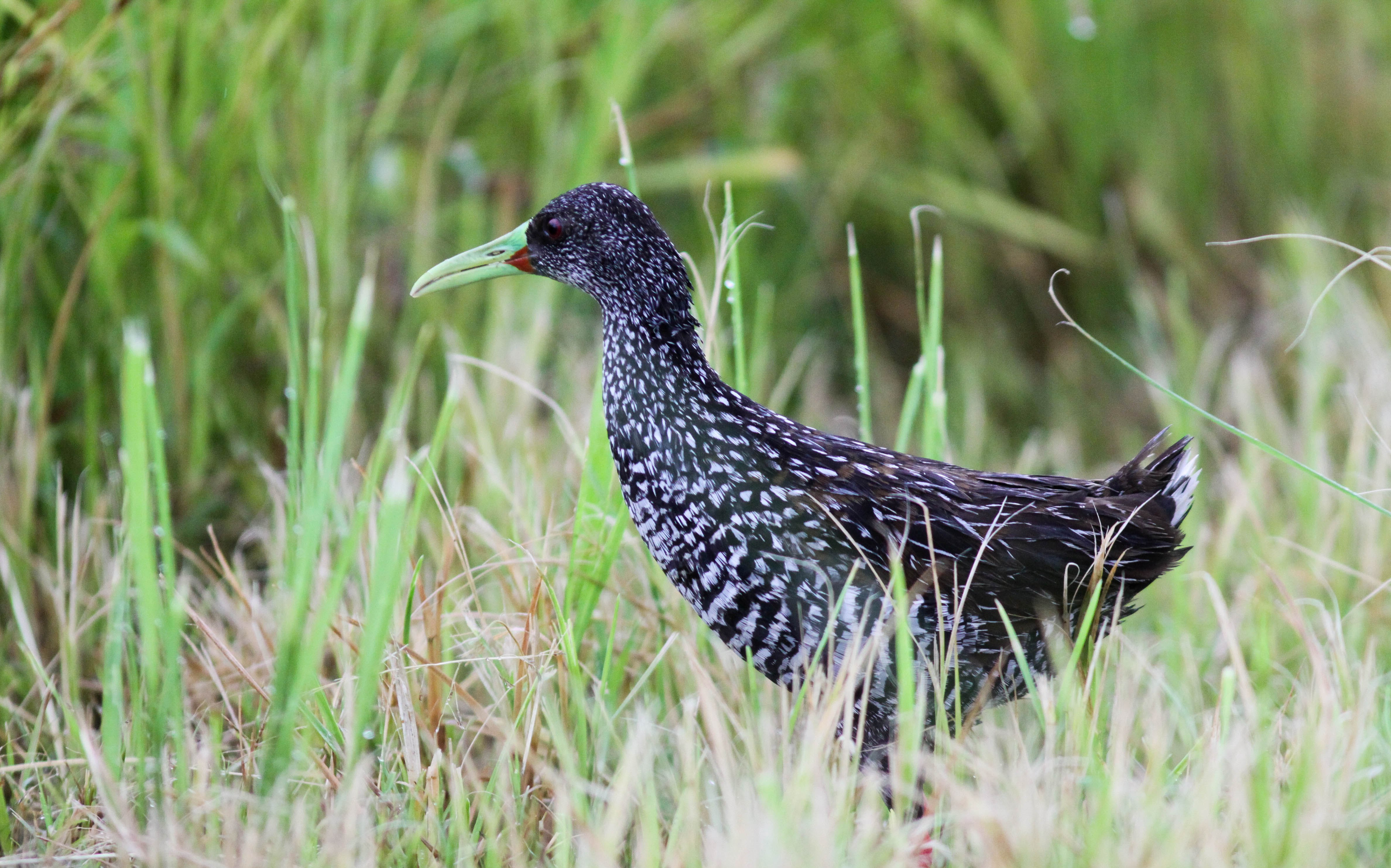

Conservation status
- Least Concern (IUCN 3.1)

Scientific classification
- Kingdom: Animalia
- Phylum: Chordata
- Class: Aves
- Order: Gruiformes
- Family: Rallidae
- Genus: Pardirallus
- Species: P. maculatus

Binomial name
- Pardirallus maculatus (Boddaert, 1783)

= Spotted rail =

Species of bird

The spotted rail (Pardirallus maculatus) is a species of bird in the subfamily Rallinae of the rail, crake, and coot family Rallidae. It is found in Mexico, Central America, the Caribbean, and South America.

== Taxonomy ==
The spotted rail was described by the French polymath Georges-Louis Leclerc, Comte de Buffon in 1781 in his Histoire Naturelle des Oiseaux from a specimen collected in French Guiana. The bird was also illustrated in a hand-colored plate engraved by François-Nicolas Martinet in the Planches Enluminées D'Histoire Naturelle which was produced under the supervision of Edme-Louis Daubenton to accompany Buffon's text. Neither the plate caption nor Buffon's description included a scientific name but in 1783 the Dutch naturalist Pieter Boddaert coined the binomial name Rallus maculatus in his catalogue of the Planches Enluminées. The spotted rail is now placed in the genus Pardirallus that was erected by the French naturalist Charles Lucien Bonaparte in 1856. The generic name combines the Ancient Greek pardos meaning "leopard" with the genus Rallus. The specific epithet maculatus is Latin for "spotted" or "blotched"

Two subspecies are recognized:

- P. m. insolitus (Bangs & Peck, 1908)
- P. m. maculatus (Boddaert, 1783)

== Description ==
The spotted rail is 25 to 28 cm (9.8 to 11.0 in) long and weighs 130 to 220 g (4.6 to 7.8 oz); females are slightly smaller than males. The sexes are alike. They have a long greenish bill (beak) with a red spot at the base of the mandible and pinkish legs. "Immatures are much drabber (some may lack barring), but older immatures have [the] pattern of the adult." The juvenile has a more yellowish bill, a brown iris, generally drabber, especially their legs and feet and a variable plumage of 3 morphs. It can have a "dark morph, with almost plain, dark brown upperparts, and sooty, dark-tipped ventral feathers with no white bars; pale morph, with throat and breast pale greyish brown, and breast weakly barred white; barred morph, with throat grey, spotted white, and breast and belly sharply barred white". The dark morph's plumage can be confused with P. sanguinolentus and P. nigricans, but both have "paler upperparts and bright red legs and feet" to differentiate them. Additionally, P. sanguinolentus is bigger and has a grey chin and throat, a grey-brown vent that contrasts with its slaty grey underparts. P. nigricans on the other hand has a black vent and tail.

Both subspecies have a blackish head with a red eye, black and brown upperparts, and black underparts with white streaks and spots. The nominate subspecies P. m. maculatus has white streaks on its upperparts and a shorter slender bill whereas P. m. insolitus has white spots and a larger bill. The juveniles of these subspecies are identifiable due to the grey or white tipped buff undertail-coverts in P.m. maculatus and white tipped grey undertail-coverts in P.m. insolitus.

George E. Watson determined that molting lasts from August to December in the Cuban population based on the stage of molt of a few observed specimens within those months.

== Distribution and habitat ==
the subspecies P. m. insolitus of the spotted rail is found from Mexico to Costa Rica. The nominate subspecies is found in Cuba, Hispaniola (the Dominican Republic and Haiti), Jamaica, and every mainland South American country except Guyana (though in Chile only as a vagrant to the Juan Fernández Islands). The species also occurs in Panama but the subspecies there is not known. Its distribution in Mexico, Central America, and much of South America is local rather than continuous. In addition to Chile, it has occurred as a vagrant in Trinidad and the U.S. states of Pennsylvania and Texas.

The spotted rail inhabits wet landscapes including marshes, swamps, rice fields, and wet grasslands. It requires dense cover.

== Behavior ==
=== Movement ===
The spotted rail has no pattern of movement, though it is known to move locally in response to changing water levels or drought, and has documented vagrancy. Some observations of a Spotted Rail in captivity in Mexico note that they climb up vegetation using their wings for balance and they fly back down.

=== Feeding ===
The spotted rail forages in shallow water or along the water's edge. It usually stays in cover but at dawn and dusk may feed in more open areas. Its diet includes earthworms, adult and larval insects and other invertebrates, and also small fish and pondweed (Potamogeton epihydrus).

=== Breeding ===
The spotted rail's breeding season varies widely across its range. There are no differences in colour during breeding season, but they have enlarged gonads. It appears to be territorial during the breeding season. It makes a cup or bowl nest of grass or dead rushes in vegetation near the ground and often above shallow water. The clutch size is two to seven eggs. The incubation period and time to fledging are not known.

=== Vocalization ===
The spotted rail makes a "[l]oud repeated, rasping, groaning screech, usually preceded by grunt or pop, 'g'reech' or 'pum-kreep'" resembling a "decelerating-accelerating [cough]: 'pJEW-pJEW pJEEEW pJEEEW-pJEW'" when it is agitated, or making an aggressive or territorial call. "Calls include a deep thumping sound, almost low enough where one feels it more than hears it. Also a series of reedy chatters: 'tchi-di-dert,' similar to the bisyllabic chirp of Blackish Rail.". It also makes "an accelerating series of deep, gruff, pumping notes" and a "sharp, repeated 'gek'." It sometimes calls at night.

=== Threats ===
The mongoose Herpestes auropunctatus, is an invasive species that preys on the spotted rail. It is thought to have reduced their populations in the drained agricultural lands of Cuba in the 1960s. The mongoose population was also held responsible for its vanishing in Jamaica. Threats like the mongoose can become even greater when they molt most of their flight feathers simultaneously, leaving them exposed to predation.

In 2023, seventeen individual spotted rails in southern Brazil underwent a helminth (parasitic worm) inspection and three birds had Cyclocoelidae (Digenea) present in both nasal and abdominal cavities. In birds, the presence of helminths can sometimes lead to apathy or diarrhea.

== Status ==
The spotted rail is considered to be of Least Concern by the global IUCN red list because of its large range, which does not approach the vulnerable threshold (evaluated through range size, habitat quality, fragmentation, and population size). It is "[u]ndoubtedly overlooked, especially when breeding, and probably more widespread within [its] range than existing records suggest." Its population is stable and has 7000 – 18000 mature individuals and does not approach vulnerable status (considers population size, population trends over a decade or three generations as well as population structure).
