= Tsingy forest rail =

Tsingy wood rail

Conservation status
- Vulnerable (IUCN 3.1)

Scientific classification
- Kingdom: Animalia
- Phylum: Chordata
- Class: Aves
- Order: Gruiformes
- Family: Sarothruridae
- Genus: Mentocrex
- Species: M. beankaensis

Binomial name
- Mentocrex beankaensis Goodman, Raherilalao & Block, 2011

Synonyms
- Canirallus beankaensis

Species of bird

The Tsingy forest rail (Mentocrex beankaensis), also known as the Tsingy wood rail, is a species of bird in the family Sarothruridae that was scientifically described in 2011.

It is endemic to areas with dry deciduous forest and limestone karst in the lowlands of west-central Madagascar. It is larger than the Madagascar forest rail, and also differs in the colour of the throat, moustachial stripe and region near the eyes.

This species was formerly placed in the genus Canirallus together with [Madagascar forest rail and the grey-throated rail (Canirallus oculeus). A molecular genetic study published in 2019 found that the grey-throated rail is not closely related to the forest rails. The forest rails were therefore moved to the resurrected genus Mentocrex.
