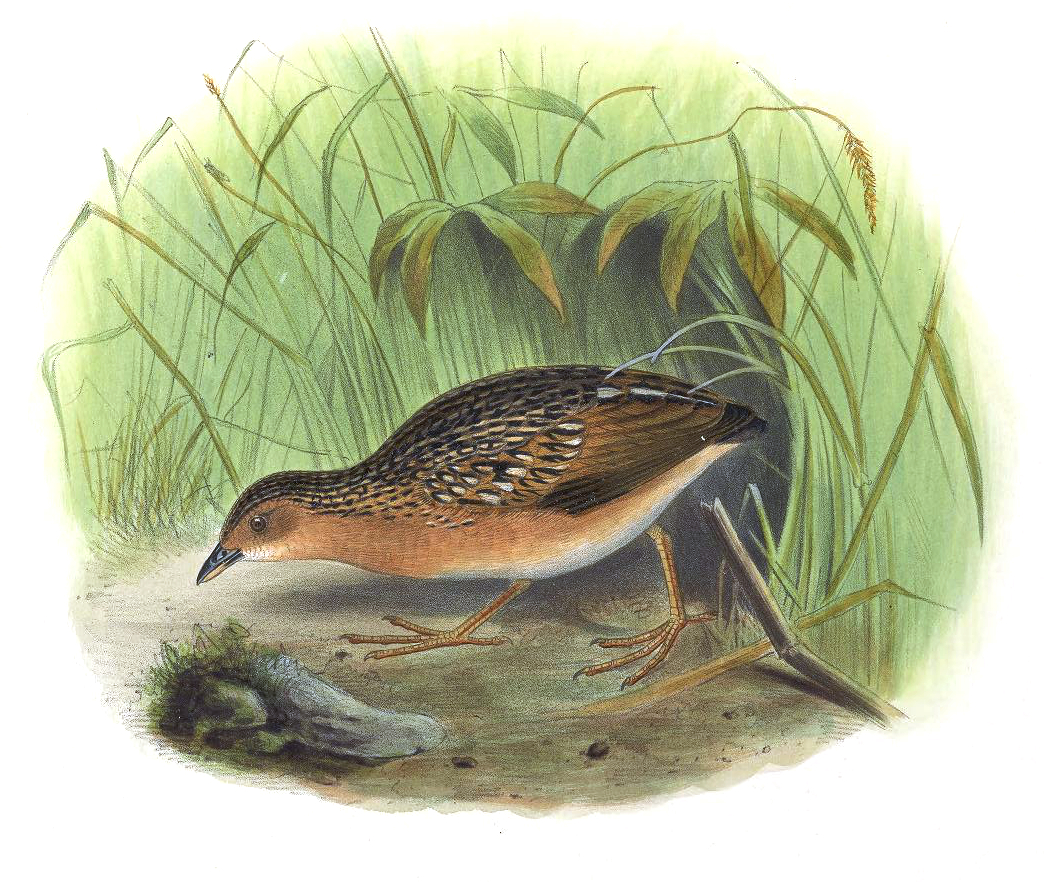

Conservation status
- Least Concern (IUCN 3.1)

Scientific classification
- Kingdom: Animalia
- Phylum: Chordata
- Class: Aves
- Order: Gruiformes
- Family: Rallidae
- Genus: Rufirallus
- Species: R. schomburgkii

Binomial name
- Rufirallus schomburgkii (Schomburgk, 1848)

Synonyms
- Crex schomburgkii (protonym); Micropygia schomburgkii

= Ocellated crake =

Species of bird

The ocellated crake (Rufirallus schomburgkii) is a small terrestrial species of bird in the family Rallidae that is native to the grassland and savanna habitats of Central America and South America. Though it is not often seen, it is easily recognizable by its cinnamon plumage with black and white mottling. This species was formerly placed in its own genus Micropygia .

== Taxonomy ==
The ocellated crake was formally described in 1848 by the German botanist Richard Schomburgk under the binomial name Crex schomburgkii. (Note: A bird similar to the ocellated crake was described without a binomial name in 1805 by the Spanish officer Félix de Azara. In 1819 the French ornithologist Louis Vieillot coined the binomial name Rallus maculosus for Azara's bird, but this scientific name has not been adopted, perhaps because the range of the ocellated crake was believed not to extend to Paraguay. Under the rules of the International Code of Zoological Nomenclature (ICZN), Rallus maculosus Vieillot, 1819, becomes a nomen oblitum.) Schomburgk credited the German ornithologist Jean Cabanis for the binomial name but as the description is not in quotes, it is assumed that it was written by Schomburgk. The ocellated crake was formerly placed in its own genus Micropygia as its phylogenetic relationship to the other crakes was uncertain. A molecular study published in 2023 found that the species was closely related to the russet-crowned crake (Rufirallus viridis). Based on this result, the ocellated crake is now placed in the genus Rufirallus.

Two subspecies are recognised:

- R. s. schomburgkii (Schomburgk, 1848) – south Costa Rica, east Colombia, Venezuela and the Guianas
- R. s. chapmani (Naumburg, 1930) – southeast Peru, north Bolivia, central and southeast Brazil and east Paraguay

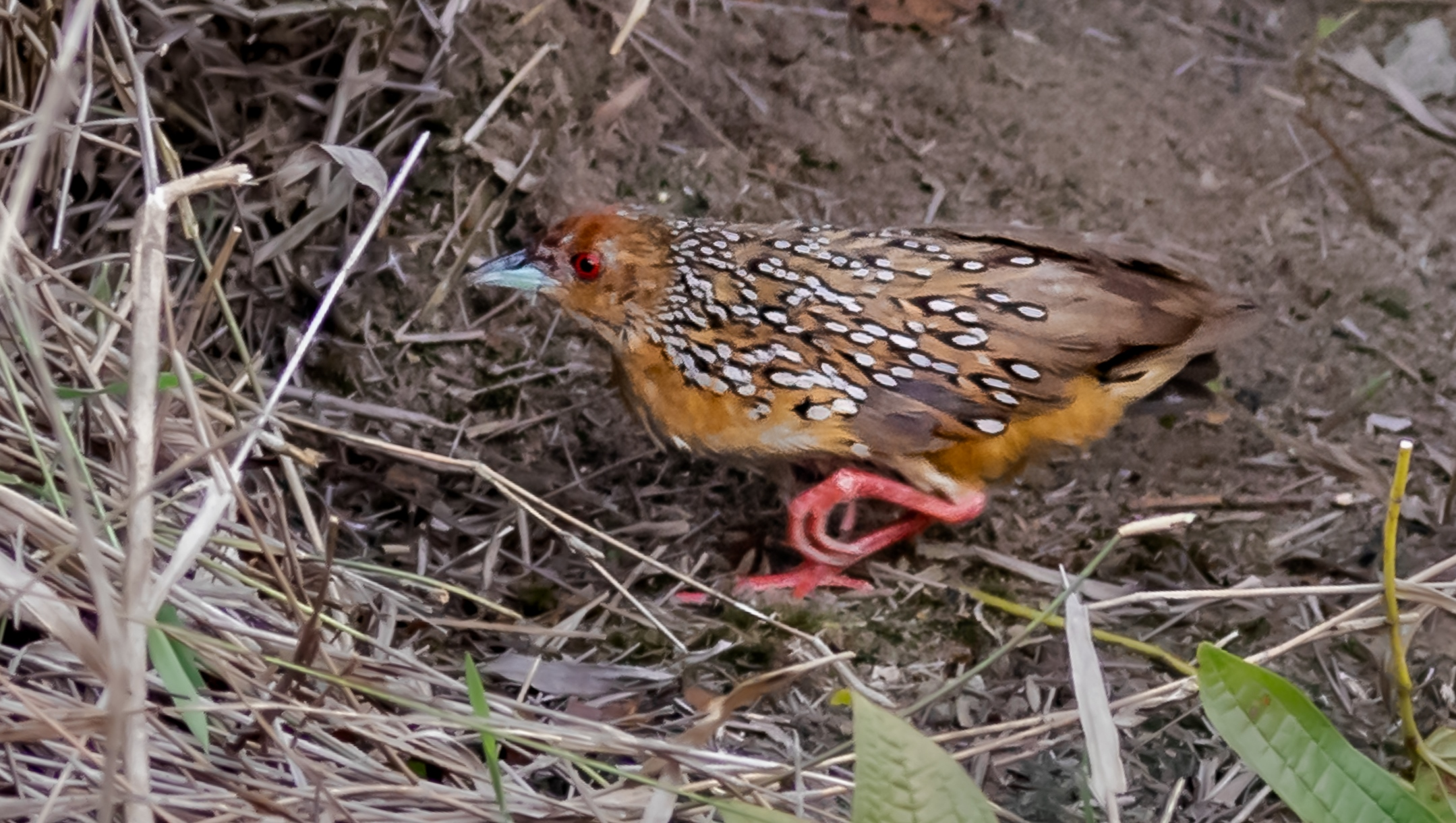
Ocellated crake in habitat

== Description ==
The ocellated crake is generally around 165mm long, and is sexually dimorphic in size, with males weighing roughly 40 grams and females 24 grams. Its plumage consists of an overall cinnamon color on the face, breast and belly. Its wings, nape and tail are a darker brown, while the crown has more of an orange hue. Some observers have suggested that the crown color is another sexually dimorphic trait. There is also a varying degree of cream or white on the throat and underparts. The nape, back, wing coverts and rump are mottled by distinctive white spots, each surrounded by a black ring. It has a red iris and its bill is yellowish-green, with some black on the upper mandible.

The subspecies R. s. chapmani differs slightly in size and coloration. It is larger, has paler underparts, and more orange-brown coloration rather than cinnamon. It has less of the distinctive black and white spotting, with the spotting not covering the rump or upper tail coverts. The black border around the white spots is also thinner compared to the nominate subspecies.

== Distribution and habitat ==
=== Distribution ===
The ocellated crake has a very scattered distribution, and is found primarily in South America, but the northern edge of its range extends into Central America. It is found in Costa Rica, Colombia, Venezuela, Paraguay, Brazil, Bolivia, Peru, Suriname, French Guiana and Guyana. A population was also recently found to inhabit Argentina. The known range of the ocellated crake has been expanding in recent years, in part because in the past its vocalizations have been difficult to distinguish from other closely-related species of rails including those of the Laterallus and Anurolimnas genera.

Rails are notoriously difficult to observe due to their small size and difficult to access habitat, so they are easier to identify through their trills, which are their most distinctive type of vocalization. Increasing recognition of the trill, along with more access to recordings and the ability to use the playback technique have made the species easier to detect, leading to a more comprehensive distribution.

=== Habitat ===
The ocellated crake is found in open grassland and savanna habitats, generally densely-packed and tall grasses of one meter or more. It can be found in either dryer, well-drained habitats or wetter, flooded ones, and is observed more frequently in dry habitats. These grasslands are generally successional habitats that form as a result of major disturbances to an area, either as a result of anthropogenic activity or naturally-occurring disturbances, primarily wildfires.

The composition of grass species in their habitat varies by region. For example, in central and southeastern Brazil, it is found in dry grasslands dominated by the Tristachya leiostachya grass species. In its range in Argentina, the ocellated crake was observed in drier grasslands where the dominant grasses were Sandysoil Indiangrass (Sorghastrum setosum) and Little Bluestem (Schizachyrium microstachyum). They can be found in habitats reaching as high as 1,700 m (5,600 ft) above sea level.

== Behavior ==
Because they live in densely-vegetated environments, ocellated crakes are rarely seen out in the open. They move primarily by running through the grass as well as through tunnels dug by rodents (such as in the genus Cavia) that also inhabit the grassland. When in flight, they will evade predators by flying low and close to the vegetation a few meters ahead before dropping back down into the vegetation. They have also been observed flicking their tails in response to excitement.

=== Vocalizations ===
The ocellated crake's most recognizable vocalization is its song, referred to as a trill. Its trill consists of a series of loud "pr pr pr" notes, lasting between 20 and 30 seconds. The trill's pitch rises at the start and then stabilizes. This trill will sometimes be followed by a series of "crying" notes, which are raspier and more drawn-out, such as "pjrrr" or "prrrxzzz". This combination of trilling and crying notes is a distinguishing characteristic of the species. Sometimes the crake will also only call out the crying notes.

The song is a solo trill, because it is sung by one individual, as opposed to the duet trills of other species of crake which involve two individuals. The solo trill's note rate is slower compared to the duet. Another vocalization often heard by the ocellated crake is its alarm call. The sound of the alarm call has been compared to the sound of oil sizzling in a frying pan, or a whirring sound. This alarm call is made by both males and females, but males have a longer sequence of alarm calls. The ocellated crake's calls are most frequent at dawn and dusk.

=== Food and feeding ===
The ocellated crake is a ground forager. Their diet is largely made up of insects, including beetles of the Carabidae and Scarabaeidae families, stoneflies, grasshoppers, cockroaches and ants.

=== Breeding ===
The breeding season of the ocellated crake also varies by region. In Brazil, breeding occurs between the months of October and March. In Costa Rica, breeding is suspected to occur during the rainy season, which takes place between the months of May and November. The ocellated crake is a monogamous species. Their nests are made out of dry grass, shaped into a dome with an opening to access it. The eggs are a dull white color, measuring roughly 25 by 19 millimeters. The eggs are incubated by the female.
