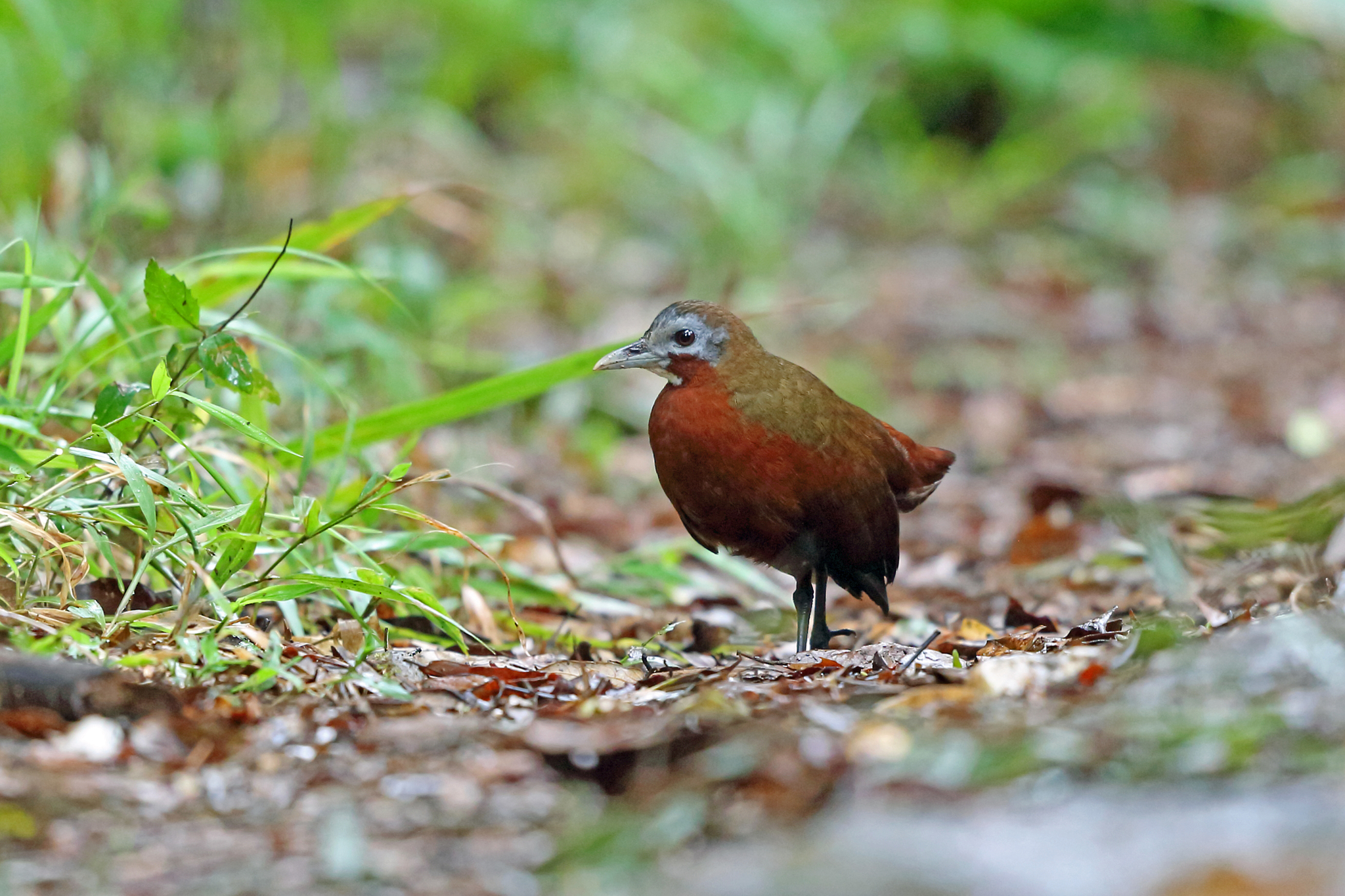

Conservation status
- Least Concern (IUCN 3.1)

Scientific classification
- Kingdom: Animalia
- Phylum: Chordata
- Class: Aves
- Order: Gruiformes
- Family: Sarothruridae
- Genus: Mentocrex
- Species: M. kioloides

Binomial name
- Mentocrex kioloides (Pucheran, 1845)

Synonyms
- Canirallus kioloides

= Madagascar forest rail =

Madagascar wood rail

Species of bird

The Madagascar forest rail (Mentocrex kioloides), also known as the Madagascar wood rail or the kioloides rail, is a species of bird in the family Sarothruridae. It is endemic to forests, often in wet areas, in northern and eastern Madagascar. The secretive and shy personality of this reddish brown bird has contributed to a lack of study on this species; a reason why it is not that well known. Their smaller size and coloration make them great foragers on the forest floor. As of recent despite habitat loss the endangerment level of the Madagascar forest rail is 'of least concern.

This species was formerly placed in the genus Canirallus together with Tsingy forest rail and the grey-throated rail. A molecular genetic study published in 2019 found that the grey-throated rail is not closely related to the forest rails. The forest rails were therefore moved to the resurrected genus Mentocrex.

== Habitat ==
The Madagascar forest rail is a native species to Madagascar where it is seen throughout eastern humid forest, covering from near sea level to 2,000 m in elevation.The subspecies, M.k kiolodies, occupies the eastern rainforest while M.k berliozi is restricted to the Sambirano region of the northeast. They inhabit dense, moist forests and they are associated with wet areas and freshwater systems.

== Taxonomy ==
The species was described by the French zoologist Jacques Pucheran in 1845. The Madagascar forest rail has also been referred to by the synonym Canirallus kiloidies and is known by several English names, including Madagascar wood rail, kilodies rail and Madagascar grey-throated rail. Two subspecies as said before are M.k. kiolodies, and M.k berliozi. The two are largely isolated from each other are not known to interact.

== Description ==
The Madagascar forest rail is a medium-sized rail measuring about 28 cm in length and weighing 250-280 g. The sexes are alike in their feathers. Adults are distinguished from the sympatric White-throated rail by their smaller size, shorter bill, darker undertail-coverts and the coloration of the head and upperparts. Fully grown, these birds reach a reddish-brown color while immature birds are born with less color than adults, with less grey on the head and yellow spotting on the undertail-coverts. The subspecies M.k berliozi is slightly larger and paler than the nominate form. It shows more extensive grey on the forehead and a larger white throat patch, while the upper back is a pale greenish-olive color.

== Behavior and Ecology ==
The species is primarily secretive and shy, often running from disturbances and remaining difficult to spot, which is partially why so little is known about the Madagascar Forest Rail. It is an earthbound forager that typically is seen in pairs, while some may also forage alone. Breeding has been recorded in May-June and again in November.

== Diet and Vocalization ==
Recorded diet items include insects, amphibians and seeds. The species eats on the forest floor, moving swiftly through dense underbrush. Its movements are low, quick and deliberate. Its most common call is a series of loud, piercing whistles. During foraging, birds produce softer vocalizations including muffled, throaty chortles that contact calls of the Brown Lemur. Additional calls include brief metallic notes, sharp “nak” sounds that may accelerate into a rapid rattle, as well as low “bub” notes and harsh clucks.

== Conservation ==
The Madagascar forest rail was most recently assessed for the IUCN Red list in 2021. Habitat loss like forest destruction driven by slash and burning agriculture as well as lumber for firewood. Over the past three generations (approximately 15.18 years), an estimated 16% of tree cover within the species range has been lost. Still, the Red List assessment labels this bird endangerment as “of least concern.”
