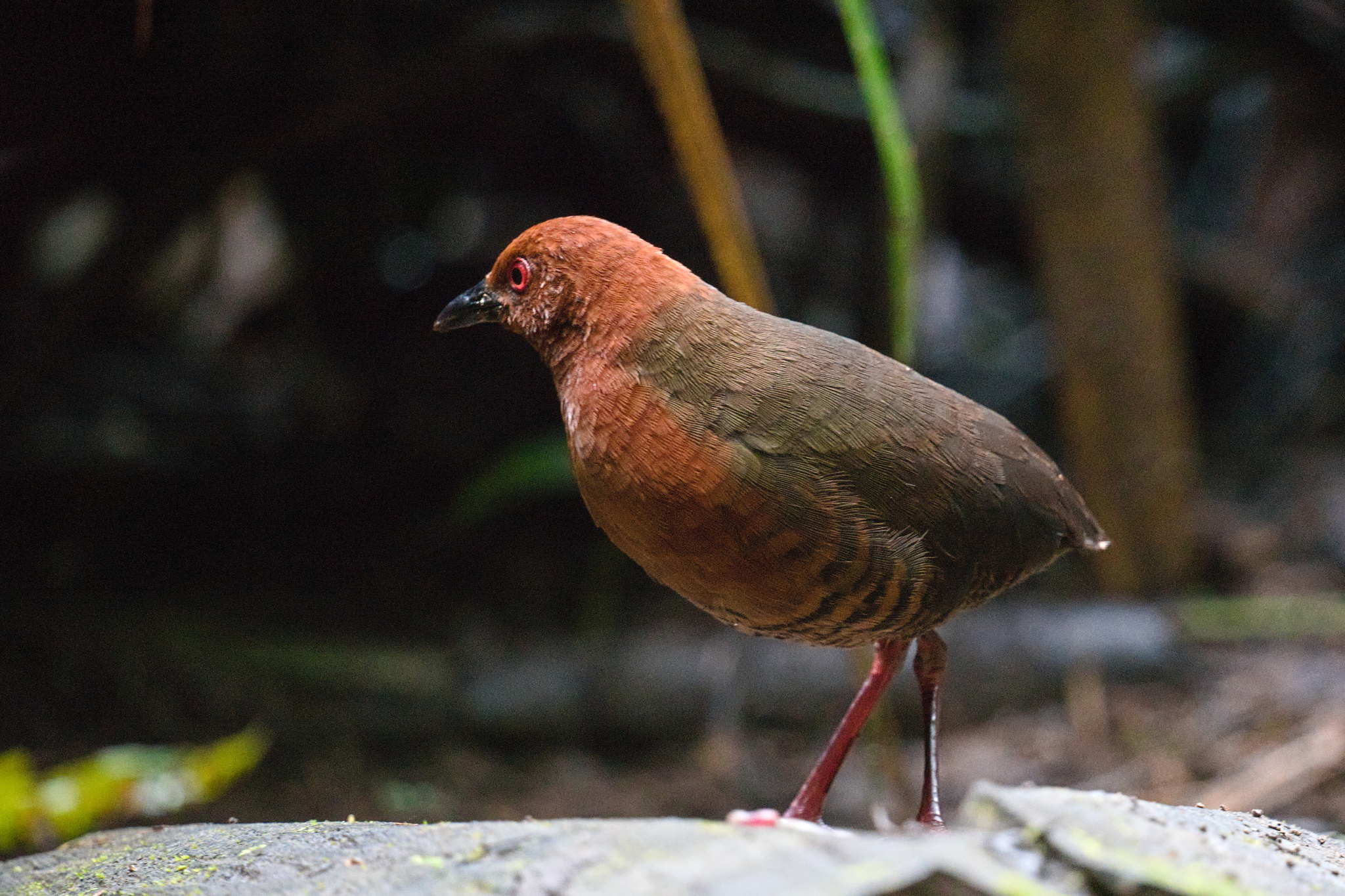

Conservation status
- Least Concern (IUCN 3.1)

Scientific classification
- Kingdom: Animalia
- Phylum: Chordata
- Class: Aves
- Order: Gruiformes
- Family: Rallidae
- Genus: Rufirallus
- Species: R. fasciatus

Binomial name
- Rufirallus fasciatus (Sclater, PL & Salvin, 1868)

Synonyms
- Porzana fasciata; Porzana hauxwelli; Laterallus fasciatus; Anurolimnas fasciatus

= Black-banded crake =

Species of bird

The black-banded crake (Rufirallus fasciatus) is a species of bird in subfamily Rallinae of family Rallidae, the rails, gallinules, and coots. It is found in Brazil, Colombia, Ecuador, and Peru. The species was formerly placed in the genus Laterallus.

== Taxonomy ==
The black-banded crake was formally described in 1868 by the English ornithologists Philip Sclater and Osbert Salvin based a specimen collected in eastern Peru. They placed the species in the genus Porzana and coined the binomial name Porzana fasciata. (Note: Sclater and Salvin described the black-banded crake in a later volume of the journal under the binomial name Porzana hauxwelli, after the zoological collector, John Hauxwell. The American ornithologist James L. Peters in the second volume of his Check-List of Birds of the World used this name rather than the earlier Porzana fasciatus.) The closest relatives of the black-banded crake were uncertain and the species was variously placed in the genera Porzana, Laterallus and Anurolimnas. Based on a molecular phylogenetic study published in 2023 the black-banded crake is now placed with four other crakes in the genus Rufirallus that had been introduced in 1856 by the French naturalist Charles Lucien Bonaparte. The genus name combines the Latin rufus meaning "rufous" with the genus Rallus that had been introduced by Carl Linnaeus in 1758 for the rails. The specific epithet fasciatus is Late Latin meaning "banded", from Latin fascia meaning "band" or "stripe".. The species is considered to be monotypic: no subspecies are recognised.

== Description ==
The black-banded crake is 17 to 20 cm (6.7 to 7.9 in) long. The sexes are alike. Adults have a dark horn or blackish bill. Their head, throat, and breast are rufous. Their back, rump, and wings are deep olive-brown, with a light reddish tinge to the inner flight feathers. Their belly, vent, and undertail coverts are cinnamon-rufous with heavy black bars. Their legs and feet are bright coral red. Immatures have a paler head and breast than adults. Their upperparts' olive-brown has a chestnut wash and the barring on their underparts is olive-brown. One author described the black-banded crake's song as "a rubbery, musical trill, deeper and more bubbly than that of [other] Laterallus crakes." The female sings a shorter version of the song than the male.

== Distribution and habitat ==
The black-banded crake is found in the western Amazon Basin, from southeastern Colombia south through eastern Ecuador to south-central Peru and east into western Brazil. It inhabits humid landscapes with a dense understory such as secondary forest, where it especially favors overgrown agricultural plots in tropical evergreen forest. It also favors thickets of Heliconia and, on river islands, stands of Cecropia. In elevation it is mostly found below 600 m (2,000 ft) but reaches as high as 1,100 m (3,600 ft) locally in Ecuador. The black-banded crake is a year-round resident throughout its range.

== Behavior ==
=== Feeding ===
The black-banded crake forages on damp ground in dense cover, where it searches for food in leaf litter. Its diet has not been documented but is assumed to be invertebrates and seeds.

=== Breeding ===
Almost nothing is known about the black-banded crake's breeding biology. It vigorously defends territories of up to about 2 ha (5 acres). It makes a dome nest of grass with a side entrance. One was sited on a fallen limb about 2 m (7 ft) above the ground.

== Conservation status ==
The International Union for Conservation of Nature (IUCN) has assessed the black-banded crake as being of Least Concern. It has a large range but its population size and trend are not known. No immediate threats have been identified. Authors describe it as "rare to locally fairly common" in Ecuador and "rare but widespread" in Peru. The species "may even benefit from low levels of human disturbance, taking advantage of edge habitats around small garden plots."
