= Papulavis =

Papulavis Temporal range: Ypresian

Scientific classification
- Kingdom: Animalia
- Phylum: Chordata
- Class: Aves
- Order: Gruiformes
- Family: Aramidae
- Genus: †Papulavis; Mourer-Chauviré et al., 2024
- Species: †P. annae

Binomial name
- †Papulavis annae Mourer-Chauviré et al., 2024

Extinct genus of birds

Papulavis is an extinct genus of bird that lived in the Ypresian stage of the Eocene geology.

== Distribution ==
Papulavis annae is known from the site of La Borie in France.
