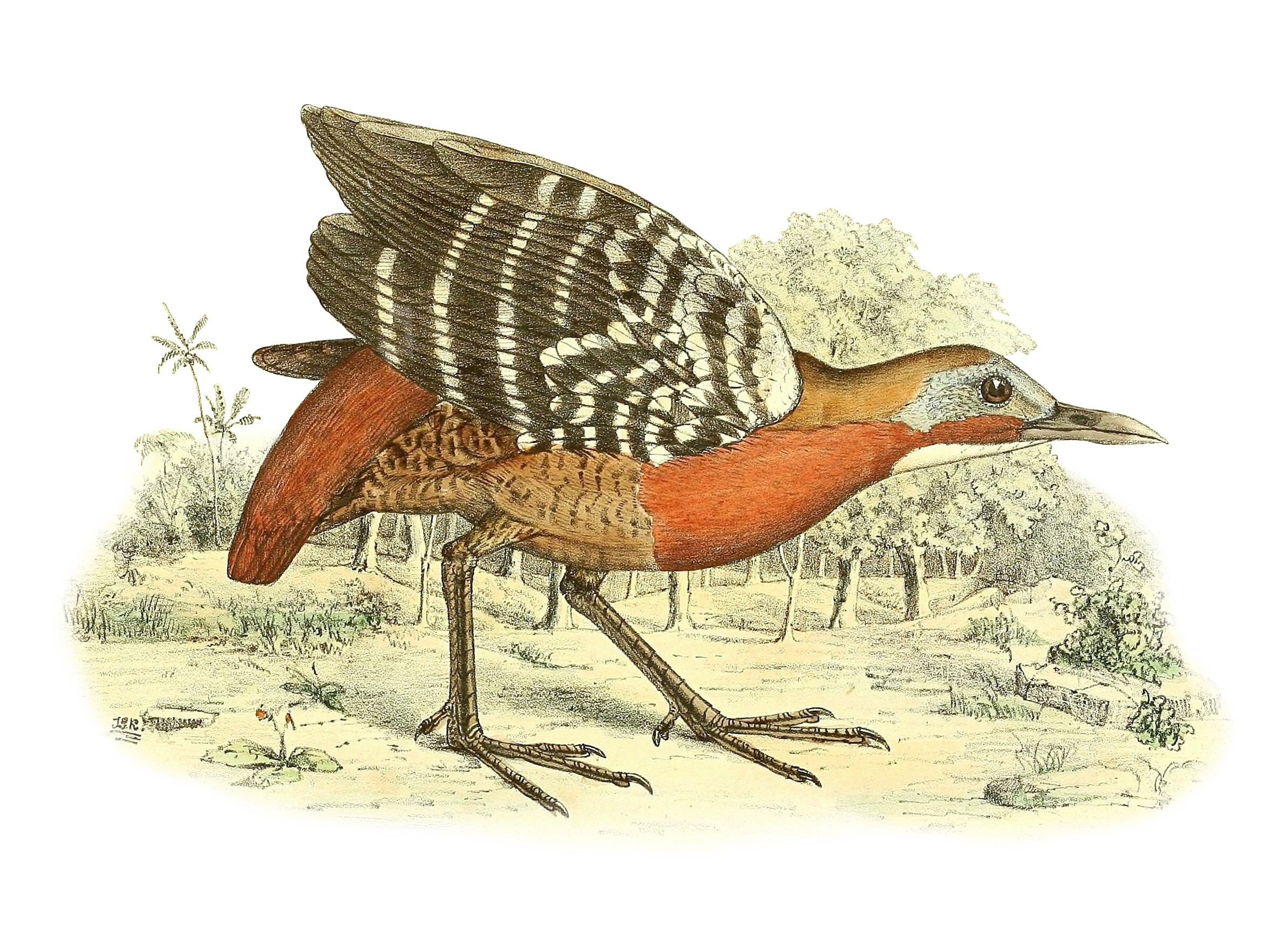
- Madagascar wood rail Mentocrex kioloides

Scientific classification
- Domain: Eukaryota
- Kingdom: Animalia
- Phylum: Chordata
- Class: Aves
- Order: Gruiformes
- Family: Sarothruridae
- Genus: Mentocrex; Peters, JL, 1932

Species
- 2, see text

= Mentocrex =

Genus of birds

Mentocrex is a genus of birds in the flufftail family, Sarothruridae. The genus includes two species, both of which are endemic to forests in Madagascar.

== Species ==
The genus contains two species.

- Madagascar forest rail (Mentocrex kioloides)
- Tsingy forest rail (Mentocrex beankaensis)

These two species were formerly placed in the genus Canirallus together with the grey-throated rail (Canirallus oculeus). A molecular genetic study published in 2019 found that the grey-throated rail is not closely related to the Madagascan and tsingy forest rails. The grey-throated rail is related to the Rallidae while the wood rails are closely related to the Sarothrura.
