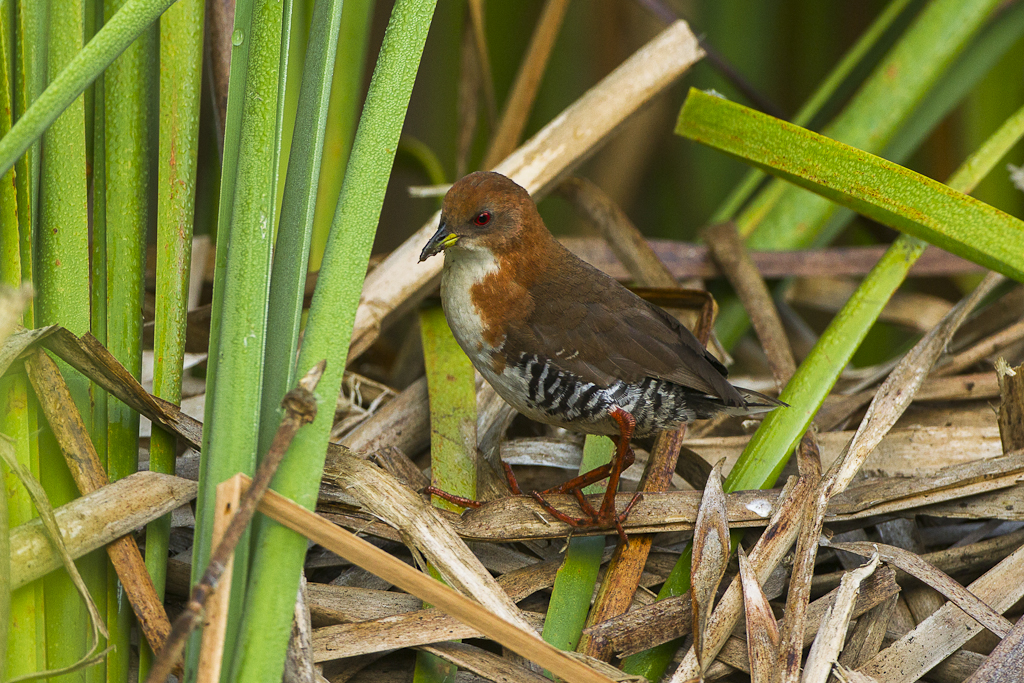
- At Intervales State Park, São Paulo state, Brazil

Conservation status
- Least Concern (IUCN 3.1)

Scientific classification
- Kingdom: Animalia
- Phylum: Chordata
- Class: Aves
- Order: Gruiformes
- Family: Rallidae
- Genus: Rufirallus
- Species: R. leucopyrrhus

Binomial name
- Rufirallus leucopyrrhus (Vieillot, 1819)

Synonyms
- Laterallus leucopyrrhus Rallus leucopyrrhus

= Red-and-white crake =

Species of bird

The red-and-white crake (Rufirallus leucopyrrhus) is a species of bird in subfamily Rallinae of family Rallidae, the rails, gallinules, and coots. It is found in Argentina, Brazil, Paraguay, and Uruguay. This species was formerly placed in the genus Laterallus.

== Taxonomy ==
The red-and-white crake was formally described in 1819 by the French ornithologist Louis Vieillot based on a specimen collected by the Spanish military officer Félix de Azara in Paraguay. Vieillot placed the new species with the rails in the genus Rallus and coined the binomial name Rallus leucopyrrhus. The species was formerly placed in the genus Laterallus but in 2023 a molecular phylogenetic study found that the genus was polyphyletic. In the reorganization of the species to create monophyletic genera, the red-and-white crake was placed with four other crakes in the genus Rufirallus that had been introduced in 1856 by the French naturalist Charles Lucien Bonaparte. The genus name combines the Latin rufus meaning "rufous" with the genus Rallus that had been introduced by Carl Linnaeus in 1758 for the rails. The specific epithet leucopyrrhus combines the Ancient Greek λευκος/leukos meaning "white" with πυρρος/purrhos meaning "flame-coloured". The species is considered to be monotypic: no subspecies are recognised.

== Description ==
The red-and-white crake is 14 to 17 cm (5.5 to 6.7 in) long and weighs 34 to 52 g (1.2 to 1.8 oz) with an average of about 45 g (1.6 oz)). The sexes are alike. Their head, neck and back are bright chestnut with a sharp demarcation from their white throat and breast. The rest of their upperparts are dark olive brown, and their flanks are barred black and white. Their unique undertail coverts as a whole have a black center and white edges. Their legs are bright coral red to salmon-pink and their bill is black with a yellow base and mandible and a light green to light blue tip. The song is "a prolonged throaty chatter; also described as a resonant trill", sometimes given in duet. An alarm call is "a low cui whistle" and a call believed to be aggressive is a "harsh chrrrrrr...".

== Distribution and habitat ==
The red-and-white crake is found in southeastern Brazil from Río de Janeiro state south through eastern Paraguay and much of Uruguay into northeastern Argentina as far as northern Buenos Aires Province. It inhabits a variety of wet landscapes that generally have shallow water to moist soil, tall or matted grasses or reeds, and often shrubs, thickets, and scattered small trees. It appears to be a year-round resident throughout its range.

== Behavior ==
=== Feeding ===
The red-and-white crake usually forages by itself, walking on the ground or climbing among vegetation. Its diet is mostly small invertebrates such as insects and worms, and also includes seeds.

=== Breeding ===
The red-and-white crake's breeding season in Argentina appears to span from October to February but is not known elsewhere. Both sexes build the nest, which is a ball of grass, herbs, and reeds attached to marsh vegetation up to about 1 m (3 ft) above the ground. It has a side entrance. The typical clutch size is three eggs. In captivity the incubation period is about 24 days and young are independent in about four weeks.

== Conservation status ==
The International Union for Conservation of Nature (IUCN) has assessed the red-and-white crake as being of Least Concern. It has a fairly large range, but its population size and trend are not known. No immediate threats have been identified. However, "habitat destruction by urban growth, land filling and livestock grazing" have a direct effect.
