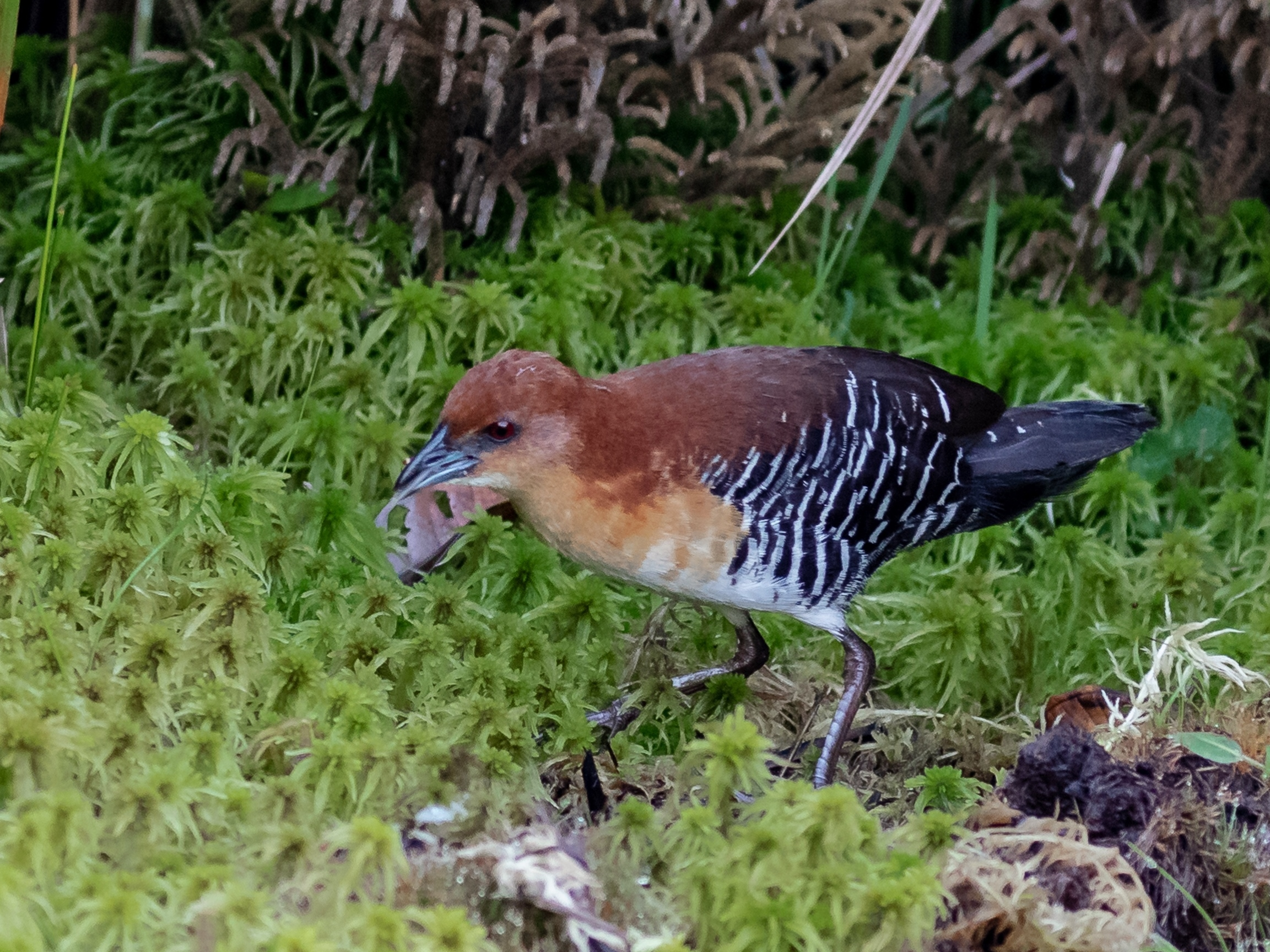

Conservation status
- Vulnerable (IUCN 3.1)

Scientific classification
- Kingdom: Animalia
- Phylum: Chordata
- Class: Aves
- Order: Gruiformes
- Family: Rallidae
- Genus: Rufirallus
- Species: R. xenopterus

Binomial name
- Rufirallus xenopterus (Conover, 1934)

Synonyms
- Laterallus xenopterus

= Rufous-faced crake =

Species of bird

The rufous-faced crake (Rufirallus xenopterus) is a species of bird in subfamily Rallinae of family Rallidae, the rails, gallinules, and coots. It is found in Bolivia, Brazil, and Paraguay. This species was formerly placed in the genus Laterallus.

== Taxonomy ==
The rufous-faced crake was formally described in 1934 by the American amateur ornithologist Boardman Conover based on a specimen collected near the town of Horqueta in central Paraguay. Conover assigned the species to the genus Laterallus and coined the binomial name Laterallus xenopterus. A molecular phylogenetic study published in 2023 found that the genus Laterallus was polyphyletic. In the reorganization of the species to create monophyletic genera, the rufous-faced crake was placed with four other crakes in the genus Rufirallus that had been introduced in 1856 by the French naturalist Charles Lucien Bonaparte. The genus name combines the Latin rufus meaning "rufous" with the genus Rallus that had been introduced by Carl Linnaeus in 1758 for the rails. The specific epithet xenopterus combines the Ancient Greek ξενος/xenos meaning "different" with -πτερος/-pteros meaning "-winged". The species is considered to be monotypic: no subspecies are recognised.

== Description ==
The rufous-faced crake is about 14 cm (5.5 in) long and weighs about 52 g (1.8 oz). The sexes are alike. They have a blue-gray bill, legs, and feet. They have a rufous face, hindneck, and upper back; a white throat and belly; and a buffy ochraceous foreneck and breast. Their upperwing coverts, secondaries, and scapulars have black and white bars as do their flanks. Their tail and undertail coverts are black. The rufous-faced crake's song is "a drawn-out, slightly descending trill". It also makes "[s]oft call notes "piú piú'".

== Distribution and habitat ==
The rufous-faced crake is found in northeastern Bolivia's Beni Department, in several states in south-central Brazil, and in central Paraguay. It is known from perhaps a dozen widely scattered locations in those areas but "given the suitable habitat in intervening areas and elsewhere[...]the species may be more widespread and less local than suspected." It inhabits marshes, especially the zones of moist to shallowly flooded tussocky or matted grass.

== Behavior ==
=== Feeding ===
The rufous-faced crake's foraging techniques and diet have not been documented.

=== Breeding ===
Nothing is known about the rufous-faced crake's breeding biology.

== Conservation status ==
The International Union for Conservation of Nature (IUCN) originally assessed the rufous-faced crake as Threatened but since 1994 has rated it as Vulnerable. Its known areas of habitation are small and widely scattered, and its estimated population of 1,000 to 10,000 mature individuals is believed to be decreasing. Loss of habitat by conversion to agriculture (corn and soybeans) and silviculture (Eucalyptus and pines) has played a major role in the species' decline.
