= Badistornis =

Badistornis Temporal range: Oligocene

Scientific classification
- Kingdom: Animalia
- Phylum: Chordata
- Class: Aves
- Order: Gruiformes
- Family: Aramidae
- Genus: Badistornis; Wetmore, 1940
- Species: B. aramus

Binomial name
- Badistornis aramus Wetmore, 1940

Genus of bird

Badistornis is a bird genus of the family Aramidae. Badistornis aramus is the only member of this genus. It is similar to the living species limpkin (Aramus guarauna) but larger. It was collected in the Metamynodon zone river channel sandstone of South Dakota.
