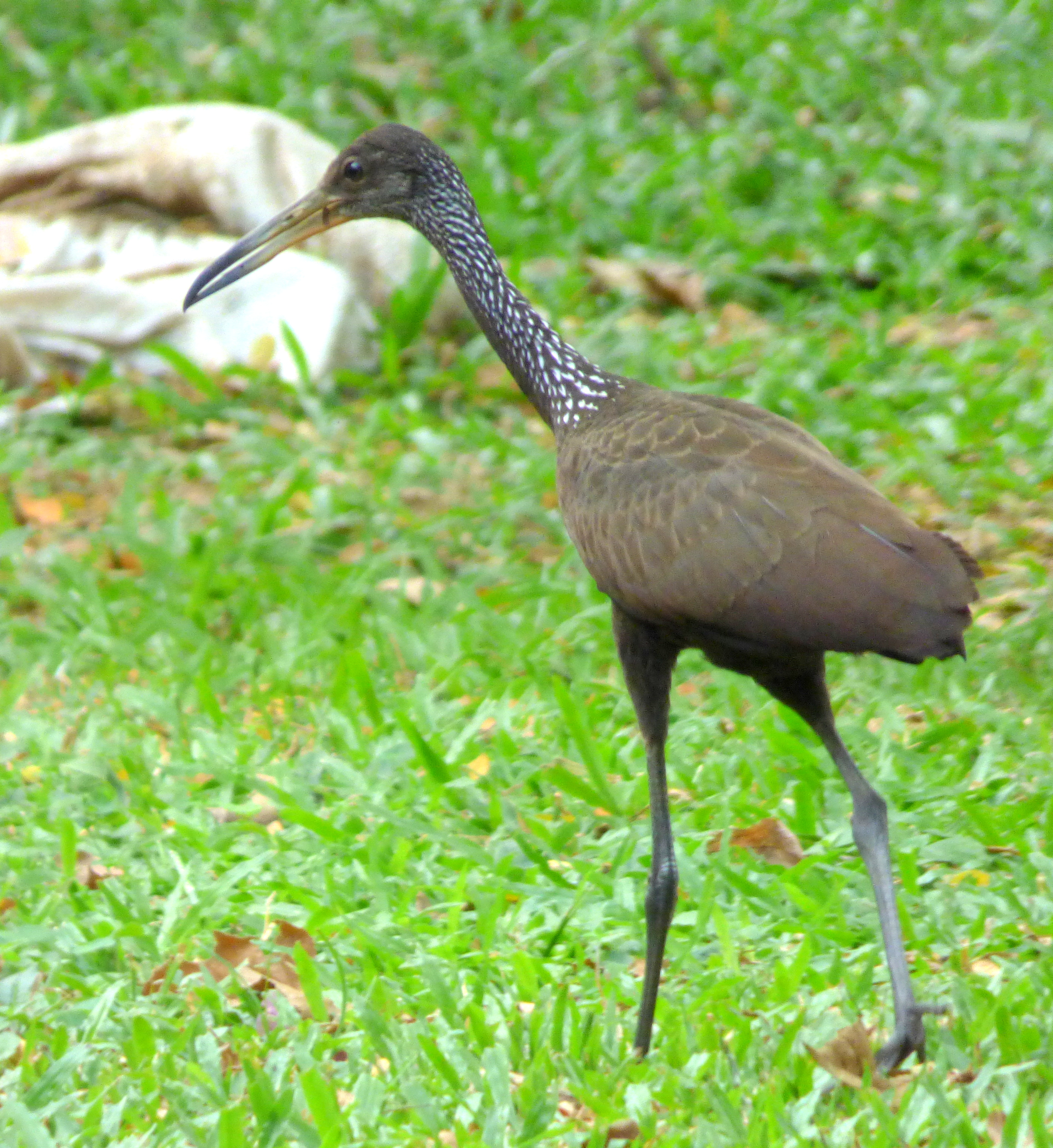
- Limpkin (Aramus guarauna)

Scientific classification
- Kingdom: Animalia
- Phylum: Chordata
- Class: Aves
- Order: Gruiformes
- Superfamily: Gruoidea
- Family: Aramidae; Bonaparte, 1854

Genera
- Aramus Vieillot, 1816; †Badistornis Wetmore, 1940

= Aramidae =

Aramidae Temporal range: Oligocene - Recent

Family of bird

Aramidae is a bird family in the order Gruiformes. The limpkin (Aramus guarauna) is the only living member of this family, although other species are known from the fossil record, such as Papulavis annae from the Eocene of France, Aramus paludigrus from the Middle Miocene of Colombia and Badistornis aramus from the Oligocene of South Dakota, USA.

Another Oligocene fossil from Europe, Parvigrus pohli, has been described as a mosaic of the features shared by the limpkins and the cranes. It shares many morphological features with the cranes and limpkins, but also was much smaller than either group, and was more rail-like in its proportions. In the paper describing the fossil, Gerald Mayr suggested that it was similar to the stem species of the Grues (the cranes and limpkins), and that the limpkins evolved massively long bills as a result of the specialisation to feeding on snails. In contrast, the cranes evolved into long-legged forms to walk and probe on open grasslands.

Anisolornis from the Miocene of Argentina, originally described as a phorusrhacid, has been considered to belong within Aramidae, but it has also been allied with Galliformes and Psophiidae. Gnotornis aramiellus from the Oligocene of South Dakota was also originally placed in Aramidae but may be a heron.

Two of the oldest supposed members of the family, Aminornis and Loncornis, from early Oligocene deposits in Argentina, are no longer thought to belong to Aramidae. Loncornis seems to be an misidentified undiagnostic mammal bone, and Aminornis was reassigned to the Anseriformes.
