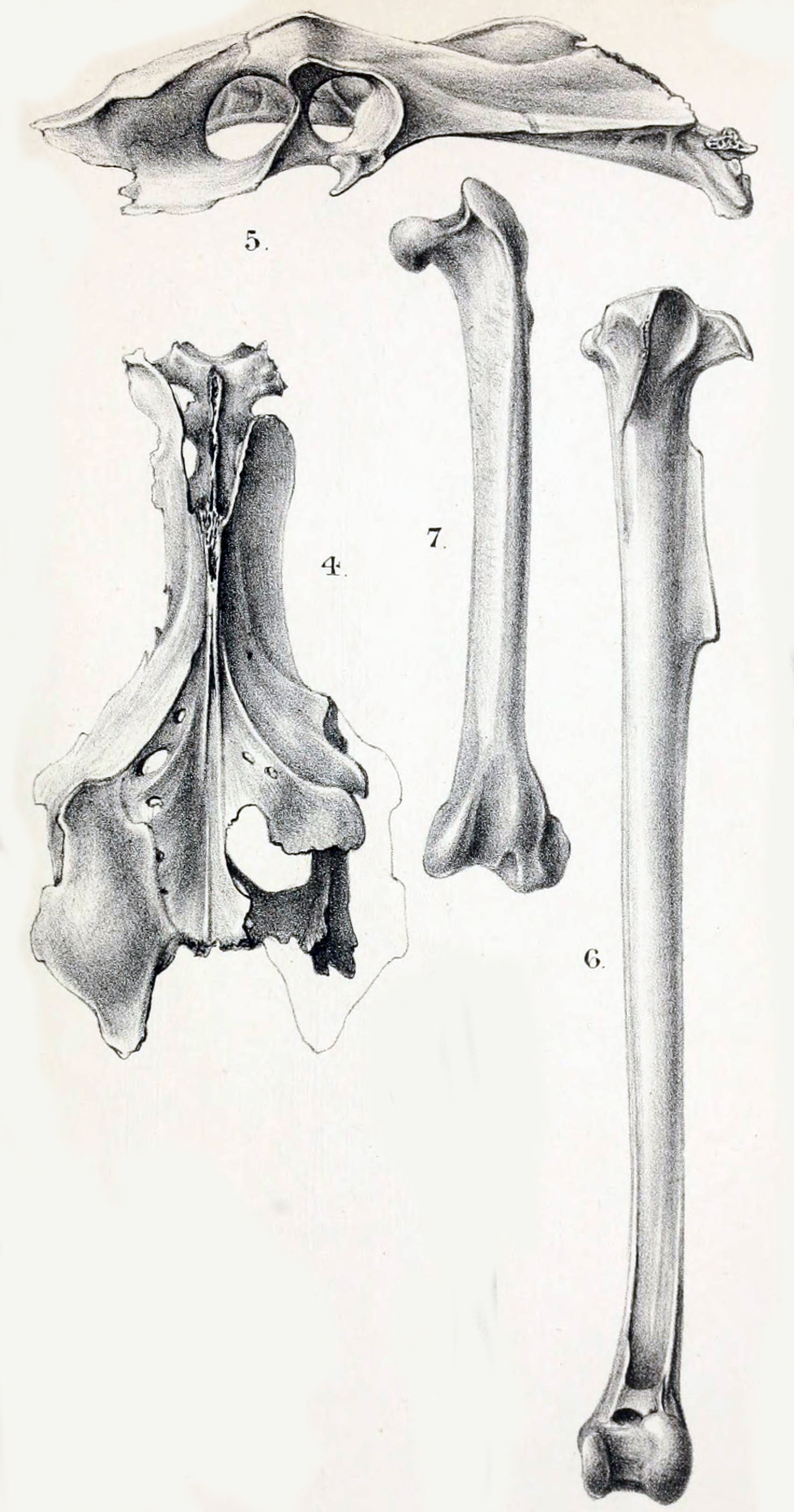
- Pelvis and limb fossils

Scientific classification
- Kingdom: Animalia
- Phylum: Chordata
- Class: Aves
- Order: Gruiformes
- Family: Rallidae
- Genus: †Hovacrex; Brodkorb, 1965
- Species: †H. roberti

Binomial name
- †Hovacrex roberti (Andrews, 1897)

Synonyms
- Tribonyx roberti Andrews, 1897

= Hova gallinule =

Hova gallinule Temporal range: Late Pleistocene

Extinct species of bird

The Hova gallinule (Hovacrex roberti) is an extinct bird in a monotypic genus in the rail family. It was a large gallinule that was endemic to Madagascar. About the size of the Tasmanian nativehen, it was originally placed in the same genus, Tribonyx. Hovacrex may also be synonymous with Gallinula. The lack of wing bones in the subfossil material found at Sirabé in central Madagascar makes it uncertain as to whether the species was flightless.
