= Rhenanorallus =

Rhenanorallus Temporal range: Late Oligocene/Early Miocene

Scientific classification
- Kingdom: Animalia
- Phylum: Chordata
- Class: Aves
- Order: Gruiformes
- Family: Rallidae
- Genus: Rhenanorallus
- Species: R. rhenanus

Binomial name
- Rhenanorallus rhenanus Mayr, 2010

Extinct genus of birds

Rhenanorallus is a genus of prehistoric rail which existed in Mainz Basin, Germany during the late Oligocene or early Miocene. It was described by Gerald Mayr in 2010, from a humerus. The type species is Rhenanorallus rhenanus.
