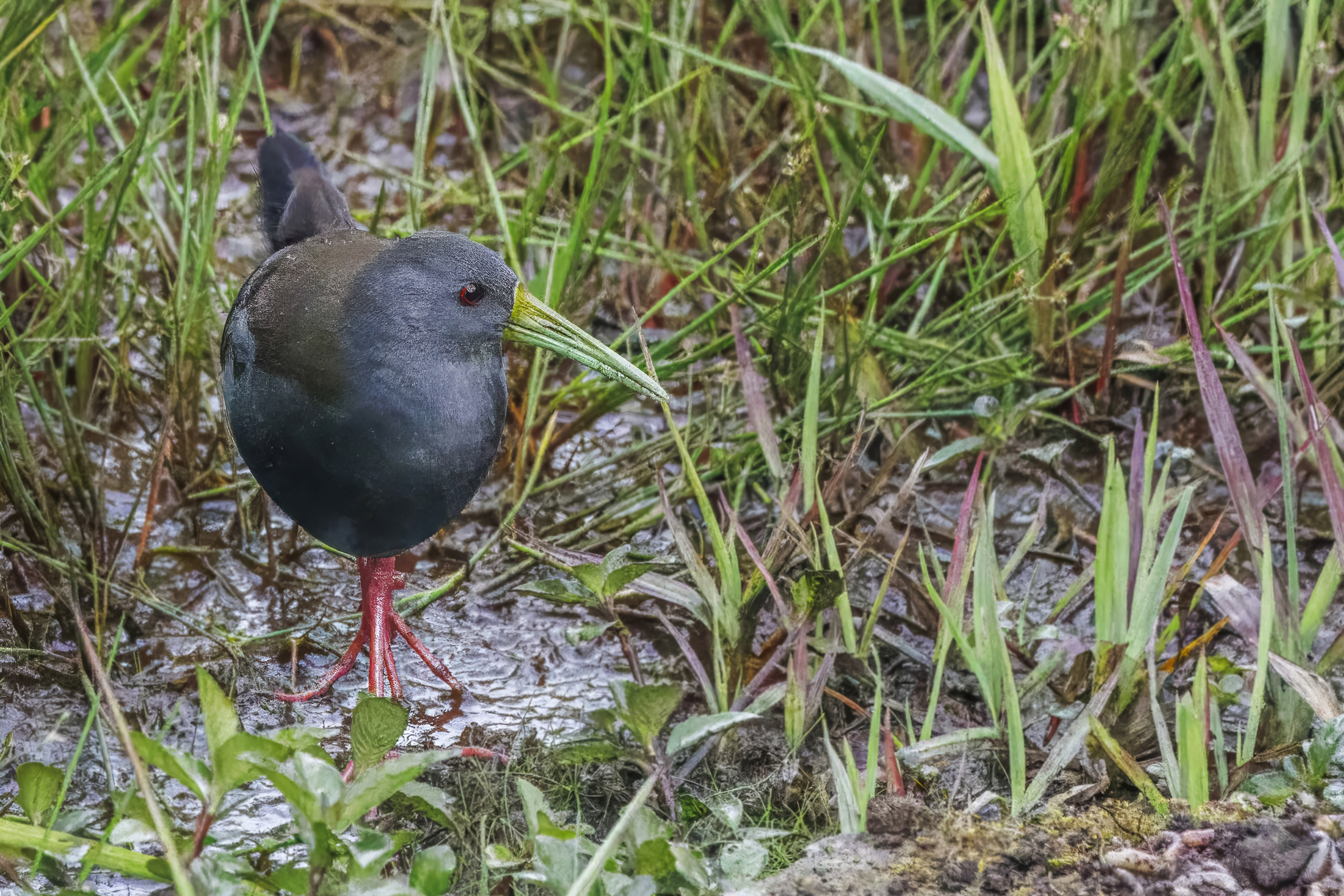
- P. n. nigricans in Ecuador

Conservation status
- Least Concern (IUCN 3.1)

Scientific classification
- Kingdom: Animalia
- Phylum: Chordata
- Class: Aves
- Order: Gruiformes
- Family: Rallidae
- Genus: Pardirallus
- Species: P. nigricans

Binomial name
- Pardirallus nigricans (Vieillot, 1819)

Synonyms
- Rallus nigricans; Ortygonax nigricans

= Blackish rail =

Species of bird

The blackish rail (Pardirallus nigricans) is a species of bird in the subfamily Rallinae of the rail, crake, and coot family Rallidae. It is found in Argentina, Brazil, Colombia, Ecuador, Paraguay, Peru, Venezuela, and possibly Bolivia.

== Taxonomy and systematics ==
The blackish rail has previously been placed in the large genus Rallus, and also in genus Orygonax with the plumbeous rail (Pardirallus sanguinolentus). Some authors propose that the blackish and plumbeous rails are conspecific, and they do form a superspecies. The blackish rail has two subspecies, the nominate P. n. nigricans and P. n. caucae.

== Description ==
The blackish rail is 27 to 29 cm (11 to 11 in) long; one male weighed 217 g (7.7 oz). The sexes are alike. They have a long yellow-green bill and pinkish legs. The nominate subspecies has unmarked dark brown upperparts, a white chin and throat, and dark gray face and underparts. P. n. caucae is larger than the nominate and has a larger and whiter throat patch and paler underparts especially at the vent.

== Distribution and habitat ==
The blackish rail has a disjunct distribution. The nominate subspecies has two populations. One is found from northeastern Brazil south and west to southeastern Brazil, northern Argentina, and eastern Paraguay. The other forms a rough crescent from western Brazil through central Peru and Ecuador nearly to the border with Colombia. There are also sight records in Bolivia that lead the South American Classification Committee of the American Ornithological Society to call it hypothetical in that country. Subspecies P. n. caucae is found in central Colombia (it is named for the Cauca River). The species has been documented in western Venezuela, but whether as a member of P. n. caucae or an undescribed subspecies is not known.

The blackish rail inhabits wet landscapes including marshes, heavily vegetated waterways, rice fields, wet grasslands, and lightly wooded swamps. It is mostly a bird of the lowlands but in the Andes is found between 800 and 2,200 m (2,600 and 7,200 ft) and there is one record in Peru at about 4,100 m (13,500 ft).

== Behavior ==
=== Movement ===
No movement by the blackish rail has been documented except for the vagrant in Peru.

=== Feeding ===
The blackish rail usually forages in cover but occasionally in the open at the edges of vegetation or in small clear areas. Its diet is not known but is assumed to be insects and other invertebrates. There is one record of an individual "venturing 5m into [a] restaurant garden for food scraps."

=== Breeding ===
The blackish rail's breeding season has not been determined. One nest of either the blackish or plumbeous rail was a cup placed among shoots on a stump in a swamp. The clutch size is two or three and the incubation time (in captivity) is 18 to 21 days. The black downy chicks leave the nest soon after they hatch, and both parents care for the chicks.

=== Vocalization ===
The blackish rail has a large vocal repertoire. What is thought to be a male song is a "very sharp, loud, penetrating, repeated 'whuueeee' or 'wheee'." Other vocalizations have been described as a "very fast, metallic 'tii'd'dit'", a "complaining 'keeeeaaa'", a "rapid, repeated 'chchchee'" and a "sharp double squeak".

== Status ==
The IUCN has assessed the blackish rail as being of Least Concern. It has a very large range and an estimated population of up to 67,000 mature individuals. The population trend is unknown. No immediate threats have been identified. It is regarded as locally common in a few areas but generally as patchy and uncommon. Its "status [is] difficult to assess, as [the] species [is] usually secretive and difficult to observe."
