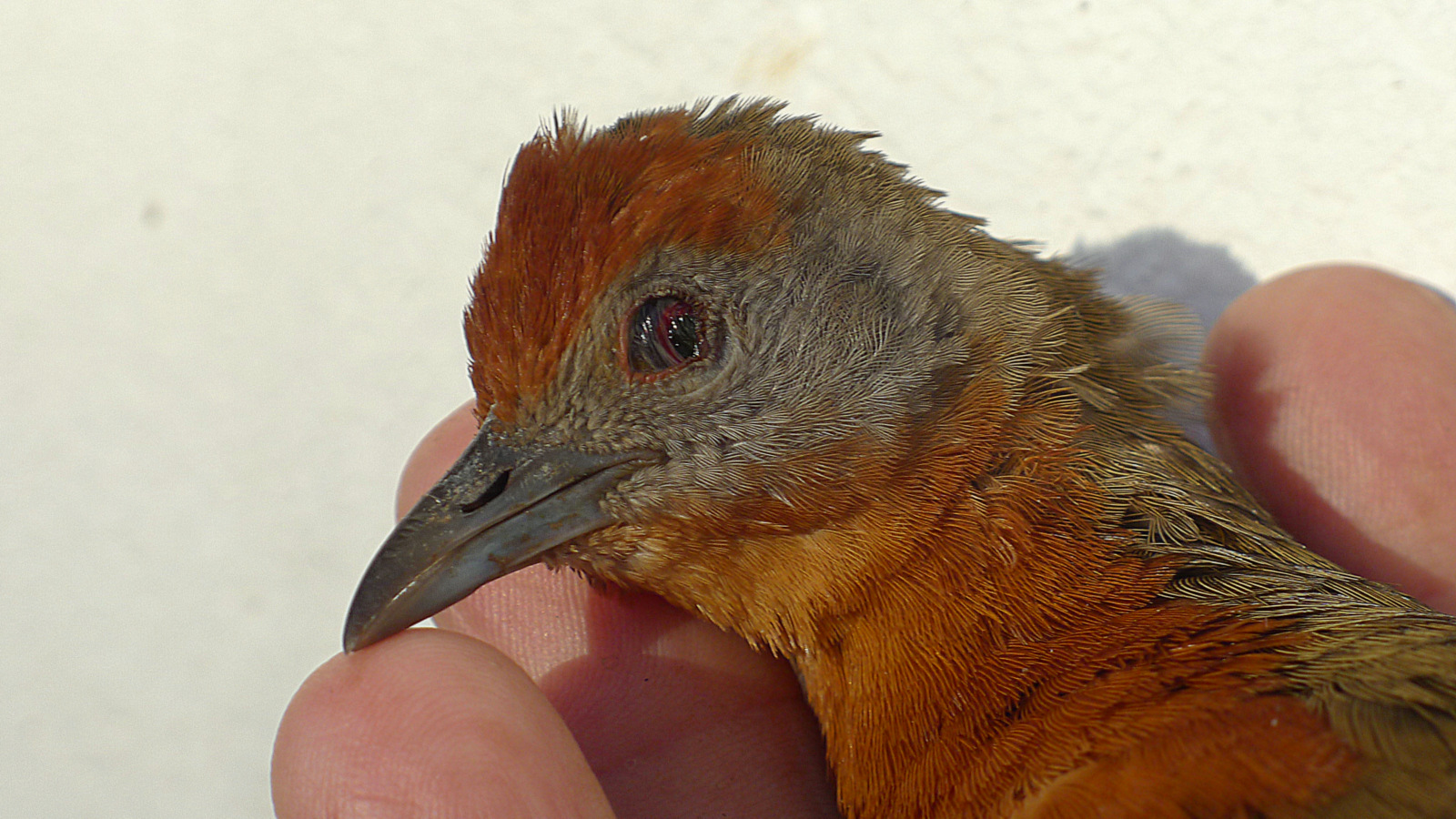
- Russet-crowned crake, Rufirallus viridis

Scientific classification
- Kingdom: Animalia
- Phylum: Chordata
- Class: Aves
- Order: Gruiformes
- Family: Rallidae
- Genus: Rufirallus; Bonaparte, 1856

Type species
- Rallus cayanensis Boddaert, 1783=Rallus viridis Müller, PLS, 1776; Russet-crowned crake

= Rufirallus =

Genus of birds

Rufirallus is a genus of birds in the family Rallidae that are found in South America.

== Taxonomy ==
The genus Rufirallus was introduced in 1856 by the French naturalist Charles Lucien Bonaparte. He listed three species in the genus but did not specify which should be considered as the type species. Subsequently the English ornithologists Philip Sclater and Osbert Salvin designated P. cayanensis (misspelled cayennensis) as the type. This specific name had been introduced by Pieter Boddaert in 1783 and is a junior synonym of Rallus viridis which had been introduced some years earlier in 1776 by the German zoologist Philipp Statius Müller. The genus name combines the Latin rufus meaning "rufous" with the genus Rallus that had been introduced by Carl Linnaeus in 1758 for the rails.

The genus formerly included only two species. The results of a 2023 multilocus molecular phylogentic study of the subfamily Laterallini by Emiliano Depino and collaborators led to a revision of the taxonomy. The genus now contains the following five species:

- Rufous-faced crake, Rufirallus xenopterus (formerly in Laterallus)
- Red-and-white crake, Rufirallus leucopyrrhus (formerly in Laterallus)
- Black-banded crake, Rufirallus fasciatus (formerly in Laterallus)
- Ocellated crake, Rufirallus schomburgkii (formerly in monotypic Micropygia)
- Russet-crowned crake, Rufirallus viridis

The genus previous included the chestnut-headed crake but this species is now placed in its own monotypic genus Anurolimnas.
