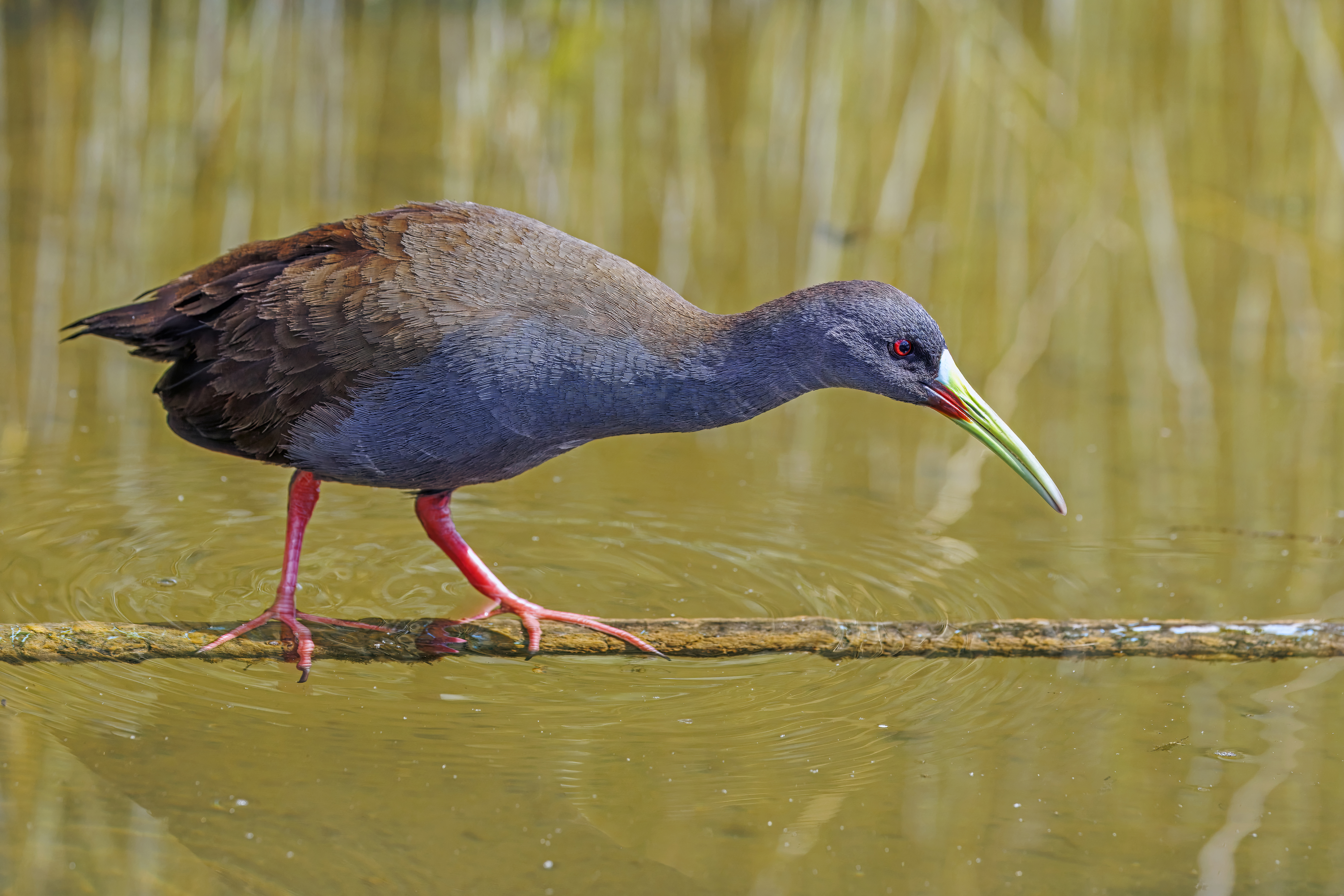
- Pardirallus sanguinolentus landbecki Santiago, Chile

Conservation status
- Least Concern (IUCN 3.1)

Scientific classification
- Kingdom: Animalia
- Phylum: Chordata
- Class: Aves
- Order: Gruiformes
- Family: Rallidae
- Genus: Pardirallus
- Species: P. sanguinolentus

Binomial name
- Pardirallus sanguinolentus (Swainson, 1838)

Synonyms
- Rallus nigricans; Ortygonax nigricans

= Plumbeous rail =

Plumbeous rail Temporal range: Late Pleistocene–present

Species of bird

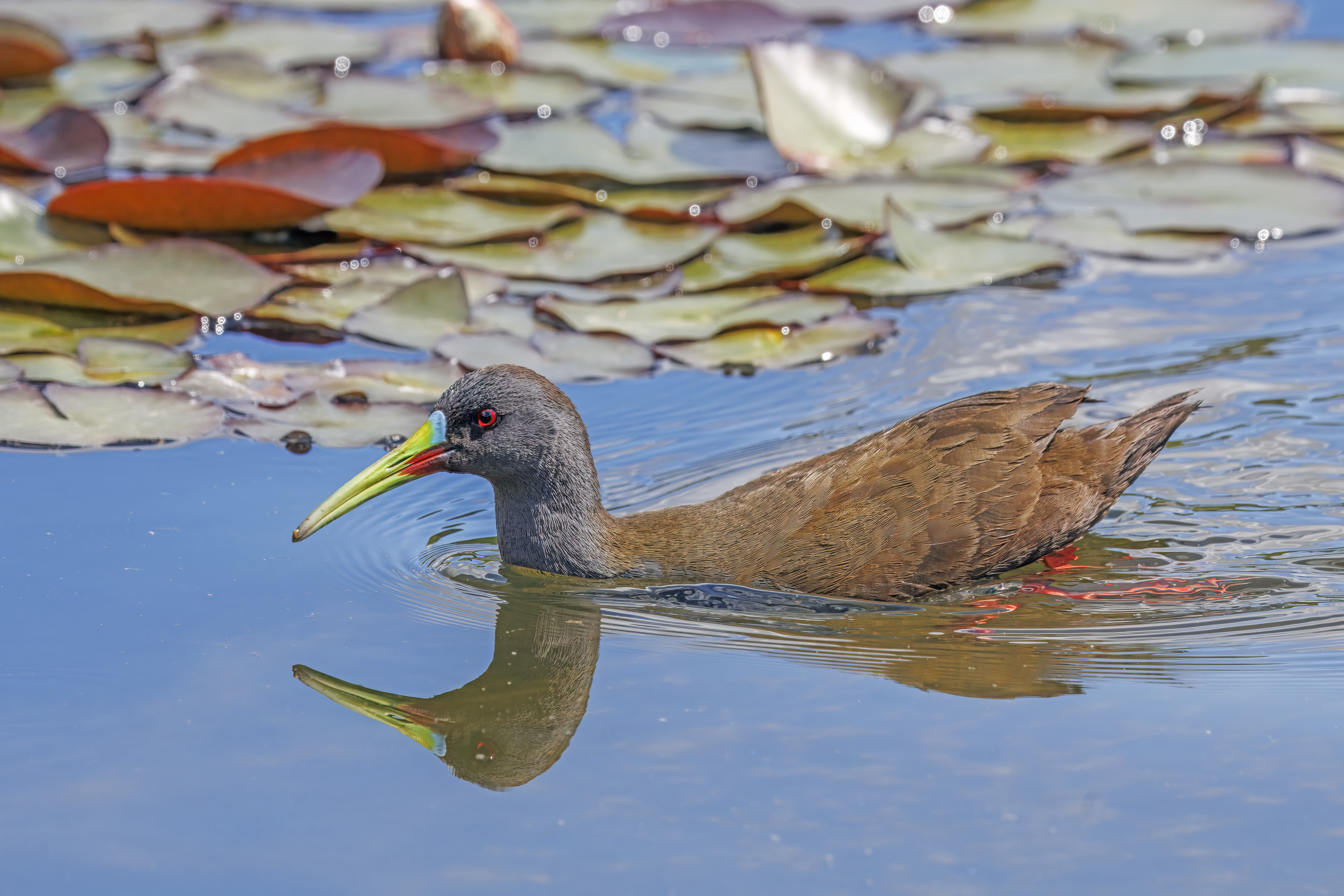

The plumbeous rail (Pardirallus sanguinolentus) is a species of bird in the subfamily Rallinae of the rail, crake, and coot family Rallidae. It is found in Argentina, Bolivia, Brazil, Chile, Ecuador, Paraguay, Peru and Uruguay.

== Taxonomy and systematics ==
The plumbeous rail has previously been placed in the large genus Rallus, and also in genus Orygonax with the blackish rail (Pardirallus nigricans). Some authors propose that the blackish and plumbeous rails are conspecific, and they do form a superspecies. The plumbeous rail has these six subspecies:

- Pardirallus sanguinolentus simonsi Chubb, C., 1918
- Pardirallus sanguinolentus tschudii Chubb, C., 1919
- Pardirallus sanguinolentus zelebori (Pelzeln, 1865)
- Pardirallus sanguinolentus sanguinolentus (Swainson, 1838)
- Pardirallus sanguinolentus landbecki (Hellmayr, 1932)
- Pardirallus sanguinolentus luridus (Peale, 1849)

== Description ==
The blackish rail is 30 to 38 cm (12 to 15 in) long and weighs 170 to 230 g (6.0 to 8.1 oz). The sexes are alike. They have red eyes and legs. They have a green bill and in all but subspecies P. s. luridus the maxilla has a sky blue base and the mandible a bright red one. The nominate subspecies P. s. sanguinolentus has mottled brown upperparts and plain gray face and underparts. The other subspecies differ somewhat in size and plumage. P. s. luridus is the largest and P. s. zelebori the smallest. P. s. simonsi is more olive brown above and paler gray below than the nominate. P. s. tschudii also has paler underparts. P. s. landbecki is more olive brown upperparts than the nominate and no mottling. P. s. luridus has no mottling on its upperparts and has paler gray underparts than the nominate.

== Distribution and habitat ==
The six subspecies of plumbeous rail are distributed thus. The species is found further south than any other South American rail.

- Pardirallus sanguinolentus simonsi, extreme southern Ecuador south along the Pacific slope through Peru into northern Chile
- Pardirallus sanguinolentus tschudii, southeastern Peru into central and southeastern Bolivia
- Pardirallus sanguinolentus zelebori, southeastern Brazil
- Pardirallus sanguinolentus sanguinolentus, extreme southeastern Brazil, Paraguay, Uruguay, and Argentina as far south as Río Negro Province
- Pardirallus sanguinolentus landbecki, central Chile between the Atacama Region and Llanquihue Province and into southwestern Argentina
- Pardirallus sanguinolentus luridus, southern Chile and Argentina including Tierra del Fuego, and as a vagrant to the Falkland Islands

The plumbeous rail inhabits a variety of landscapes characterized by water and vegetative cover. Examples include reed marshes (even small ones), ponds with floating vegetation, irrigated croplands, wet ditches through pasture, and oases in arid areas. In elevation it occurs mostly in the lowlands but ranges in some limited areas as high as 2,500 m (8,200 ft) and in a few locations up to about 4,000 m (13,000 ft)

== Fossil record ==
Late Pleistocene-early Holocene fossils of the plumbeous rail are known from the Laguna de Tagua Tagua formation of Chile.

== Behavior ==
=== Movement ===
The plumbeous rail's movement patterns are imperfectly known. Some populations, such as those along the Atlantic coast, are known to be sedentary. Those that nest on the Argentine Pampas may move north in winter.

=== Feeding ===
The plumbeous rail mostly forages at twilight but is also active during both day and night. It seeks its diet of grubs, worms, and insects in marshes, ponds, and nearby cultivated fields.

=== Breeding ===
The plumbeous rail's breeding season varies geographically but is generally within October to January. It makes a rudimentary nest of dry grass on the ground among bushes or tall grass near water. The clutch size is four to six eggs. The incubation period and time to fledging are not known.

=== Vocalization ===
Male plumbeous rails sing "a series of high, penetrating, rolling squeals" in a duet with the female's "low, deep 'hoo' notes". They sing at any time of day. Their calls are "repeated 'giyp' or 'wit' notes".

== Status ==
The IUCN has assessed the plumbeous rail as being of Least Concern. It has a very large range, and though its population size is unknown it is believed to be stable. No immediate threats have been identified. Though its "status [is] difficult to assess in many areas" it is abundant in some, and is "[p]robably more widespread than is currently known".
