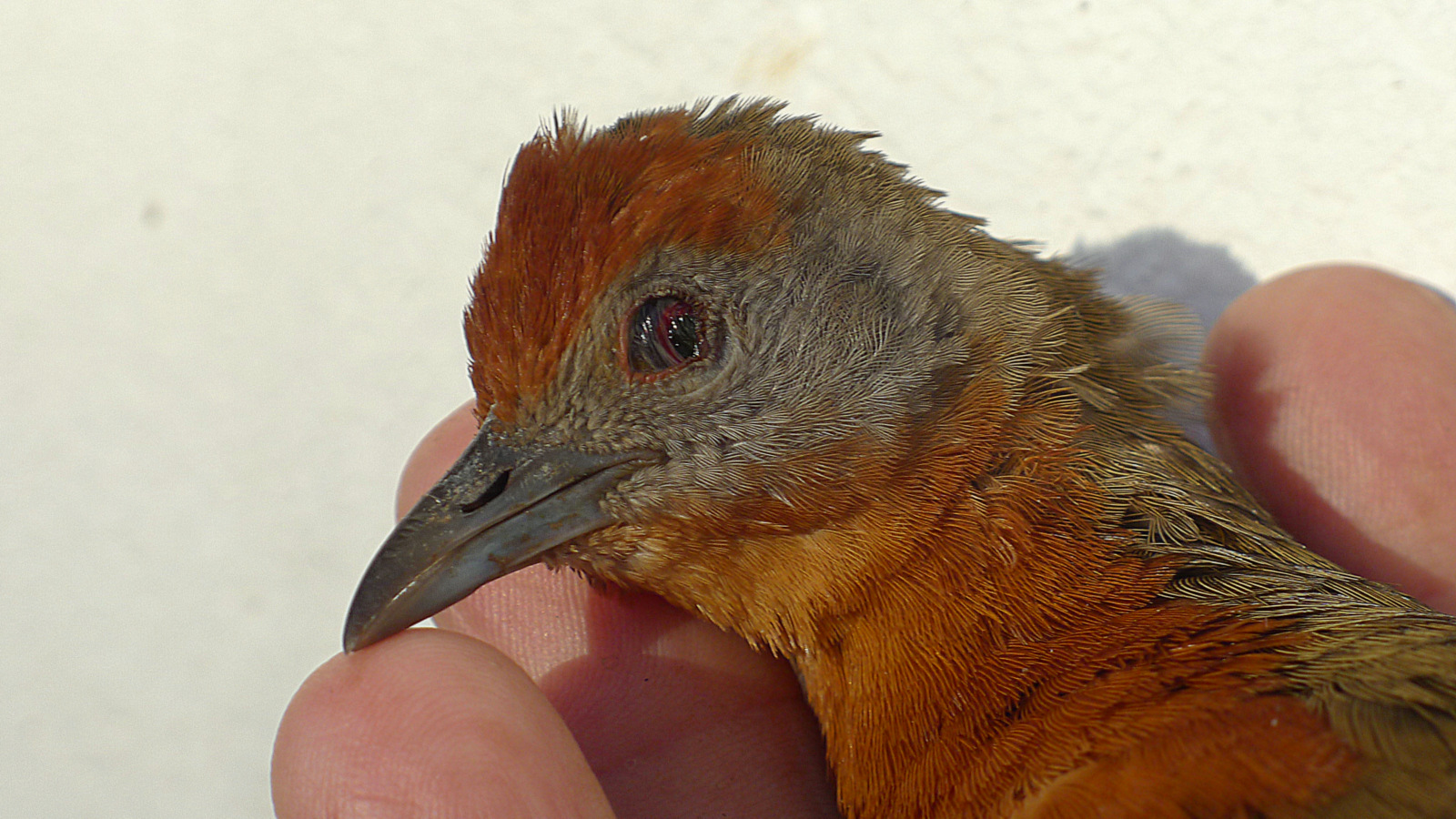

Conservation status
- Least Concern (IUCN 3.1)

Scientific classification
- Kingdom: Animalia
- Phylum: Chordata
- Class: Aves
- Order: Gruiformes
- Family: Rallidae
- Genus: Rufirallus
- Species: R. viridis

Binomial name
- Rufirallus viridis (Müller, PLS, 1776)

Synonyms
- Anurolimnas viridis; Laterallus viridis; Rallus viridis (protonym)

= Russet-crowned crake =

Species of bird

The russet-crowned crake (Rufirallus viridis) is a species of bird in subfamily Rallinae of family Rallidae, the rails, gallinules, and coots. It is found in Bolivia, Brazil, Colombia, Ecuador, the Guianas, Paraguay, Peru, and Venezuela.

== Taxonomy ==
The russet-crowned crake was formally described in 1776 by the German zoologist Philipp Statius Müller under the binomial name Rallus viridis. Müller based his account on a plate of the "Râle de Cayenne" that had been published to accompany the Comte de Buffon's Histoire Naturelle des Oiseaux. The russet-crowned crake is now placed in the genus Rufirallus that was introduced in 1856 by the French naturalist Charles Lucien Bonaparte. The genus name combines the Latin rufus meaning "rufous" with the genus Rallus that had been introduced by Carl Linnaeus in 1758 for the rails. The specific epithet viridis is Latin meaning "green".

Two subspecies are recognised:

- R. v. brunnescens (Todd, 1932) – central north Colombia
- R. v. viridis (Müller, PLS, 1776) – east Colombia, south Venezuela through the Guianas and Amazonian Brazil to east Peru and north Bolivia

== Description ==
The russet-crowned crake is 16 to 18 cm (6.3 to 7.1 in) long. Males weigh 55 to 63 g (1.9 to 2.2 oz) and females 69 to 73 g (2.4 to 2.6 oz). The sexes are alike. Adults have a black bill, red legs, gray face, and russet crown. The nominate subspecies has brownish olive upperparts and rufous underparts. Juveniles are light brown with a black face and dull pink legs. Adults of R. v. brunnescens are slightly larger than the nominate and have browner upperparts and a paler head and underparts.

It is most vocal in early morning and evening. Its call has been described as a "dry rattling like the sound of a seashell wind chime".

== Distribution and habitat ==
The nominate subspecies of russet-crowned crake is widely distributed from far eastern Colombia and southern Venezuela east through the Guianas into Brazil and south and west into eastern Peru, northern and eastern Bolivia, and eastern Paraguay. A separate population is found in Ecuador's Zamora-Chinchipe Province and another in southeastern Brazil between the states of Alagoas and São Paulo. R. v. brunnescens is found in north-central Colombia from the lower Cauca River valley east into the middle Magdalena River valley.

The russet-crowned crake mostly inhabits terrestrial landscapes; in contrast to many other species in its family it is usually not found in marshes. It is found in second-growth sapling thickets, grassy or brushy pastures, overgrown wastelands and roadsides, and gardens at the edges of small communities. In elevation it ranges from sea level to 1,200 m (3,900 ft). The russet-crowned crake's movements, if any, have not been documented.

== Behavior ==
=== Feeding ===
Almost nothing is known about the russet-crowned crake's foraging behavior or diet. It is known to mostly feed in cover and its diet includes insects and grass seeds.

=== Breeding ===
The russet-crowned crake's breeding season spans from January to June. It makes a ball-shaped nest with a side entrance from dead grass. It is typically hidden about 1 m (3 ft) up in a shrub or in other dense vegetation. The clutch size is one to three eggs, but nothing else is known about its breeding biology.

== Conservation status ==
The International Union for Conservation of Nature (IUCN) has assessed the russet-crowned crake as being of Least Concern. It has a very large range but its population size and trend are not known. No immediate threats have been identified. The nominate subspecies is believed to be common across much of its range but R. v. brunnescens' status is not known.
