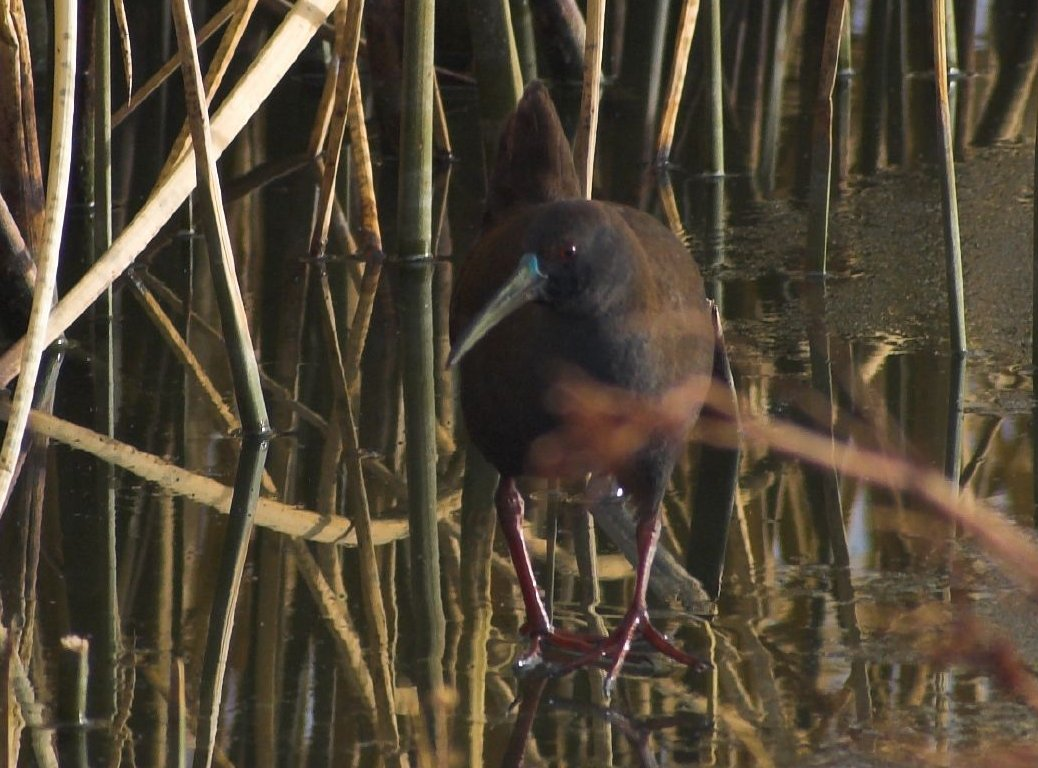
- Plumbeous rail (Pardirallus sanguinolentus)

Scientific classification
- Kingdom: Animalia
- Phylum: Chordata
- Class: Aves
- Order: Gruiformes
- Family: Rallidae
- Genus: Pardirallus; Bonaparte, 1856

Type species
- Rallus variegatus Gmelin, 1789

Species
- P. maculatus P. nigricans P. sanguinolentus

= Pardirallus =

Pardirallus Temporal range: 2.588–0 Ma Late Pliocene to present

Genus of birds

Pardirallus is a genus of bird in the family Rallidae. It contains three species native to marshland areas of Southern, Central America and the Caribbean, although fossil evidence indicates they once ranged north to what is now Idaho. They are 25–38 cm long and have a long greenish bill and reddish legs. The spotted rail is blackish-brown with white markings while the other two are brown above and dark grey below.

The genus Pardirallus was erected by the French naturalist Charles Lucien Bonaparte in 1856 with the spotted rail (Pardirallus maculatus) as the type species. The generic name combines the Ancient Greek pardos meaning "leopard" with the genus Rallus.

== Species ==
The genus contains three species :

Genus Pardirallus – Bonaparte, 1856 – two species
Common name	Scientific name and subspecies	Range	Size and ecology	IUCN status and estimated population
Spotted rail	Pardirallus maculatus (Boddaert, 1783) Two subspecies: P. m. insolitus (Bangs & Peck, 1908); P. m. maculatus (Boddaert, 1783)	Argentina, Belize, Bolivia, Brazil, Cayman Islands, Chile, Colombia, Costa Rica, Cuba, the Dominican Republic, Ecuador, El Salvador, French Guiana, Guyana, Jamaica, Mexico, Panama, Paraguay, Peru, Suriname, Trinidad and Tobago, Uruguay, Venezuela, and possibly Honduras.	Size: Habitat: Diet:	LC
Blackish rail	Pardirallus nigricans (Swainson, 1838) Two subspecies: P. n. nigricans; P. n. caucae	north-eastern Brazil south to south-east Brazil and west to northern Argentina and eastern Paraguay	Size: Habitat: Diet:	LC
Plumbeous rail	Pardirallus sanguinolentus (Loddiges, 1832) Six subspecies: P. s. simonsi Chubb, C., 1918; P. s. tschudii Chubb, C., 1919; P. s. zelebori (Pelzeln, 1865); P. s. sanguinolentus (Swainson, 1838); P. s. landbecki (Hellmayr, 1932); P. s. luridus (Peale, 1849)	Argentina, Bolivia, Brazil, Chile, Ecuador, Paraguay, Peru and Uruguay, and is a vagrant to the Falkland Islands.	Size: Habitat: Diet:	LC

A fossil species, Pardirallus lacustris, is known from the Late Pliocene of the Hagerman Fossil Beds of Idaho. It was formerly assigned to the genus Porzana upon its description in 1958 by Pierce Brodkorb and later to the genus Rallus in 1968 by Alan Feduccia, but an analysis by Storrs L. Olson in 1977 transferred it to Pardirallus.
