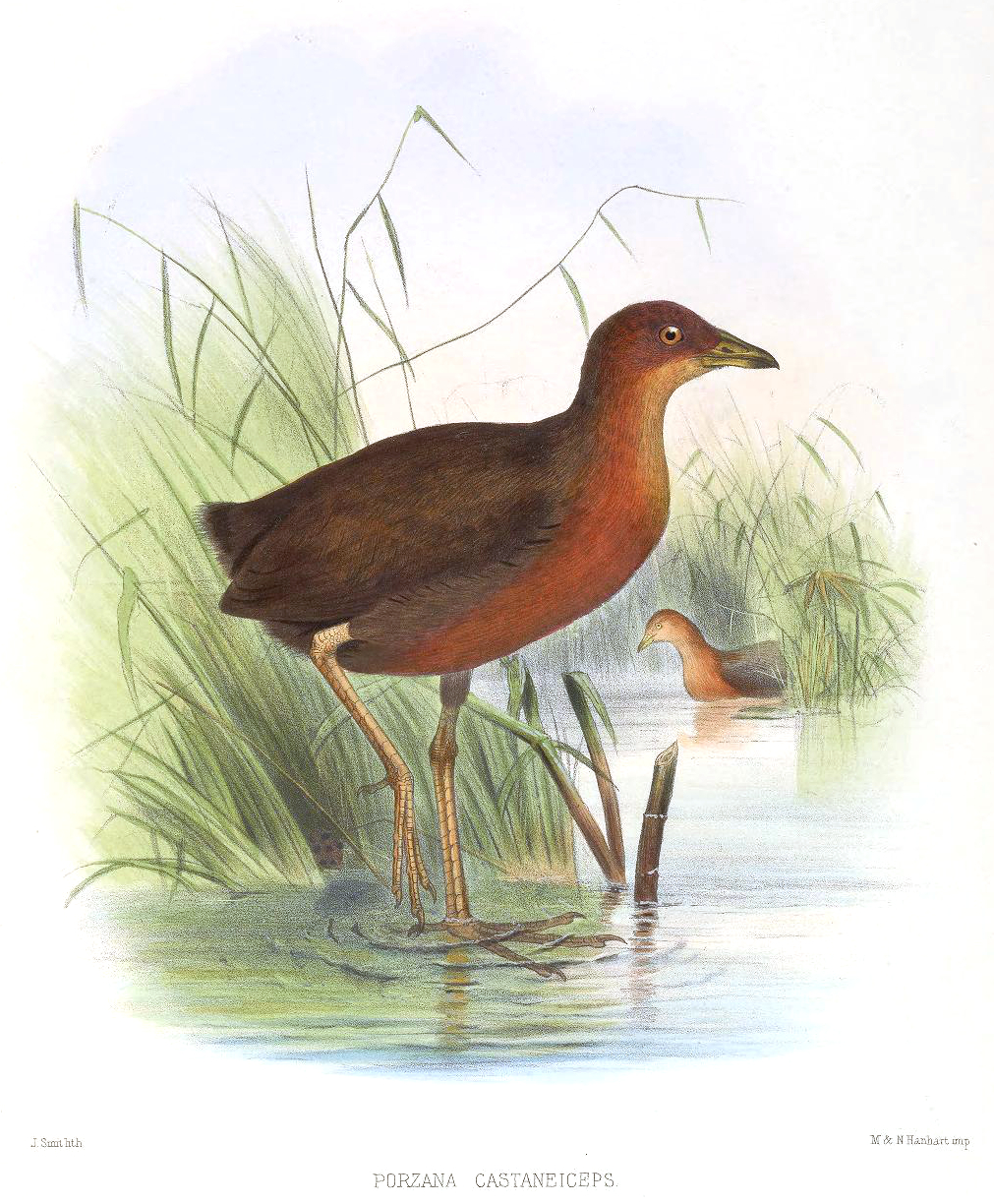

Conservation status
- Least Concern (IUCN 3.1)

Scientific classification
- Kingdom: Animalia
- Phylum: Chordata
- Class: Aves
- Order: Gruiformes
- Family: Rallidae
- Genus: Anurolimnas; Sharpe, 1893
- Species: A. castaneiceps

Binomial name
- Anurolimnas castaneiceps (Sclater, PL & Salvin, 1869)

Synonyms
- Anurolimnas castaneiceps Rallina castaneiceps

= Chestnut-headed crake =

Species of bird

The chestnut-headed crake (Anurolimnas castaneiceps) is a species of bird in subfamily Rallinae of family Rallidae, the rails, gallinules, and coots. It is the only species placed in the genus Anurolimnas. It is found in Bolivia, Brazil, Colombia, Ecuador, and Peru.

== Taxonomy and systematics ==
The chestnut-headed crake was formally described in 1869 by the English ornithologists Philip Sclater and Osbert Salvin based on a specimen that had been collected in the Napo River region of eastern Ecuador. They coined the binomial name Porzana castaneiceps. The taxonomy of the chestnut-headed crake was previously uncertain and the species was placed in either Rufirallus or Anurolimnas. A molecular phylogenetic study published in 2023 found the chestnut-headed crake formed a basal branch within the Pardirallini clade (genera Mustelirallus, Pardirallus, Amaurolimnas and Aramides) with a date of divergence from the rest of the Pardirallini estimated at 15.4 to 18.5 Mya. Based on this result the chestnut-headed crake is now the only species placed in the genus Anurolimnas had been introduced in 1893 by the English ornithologist Richard Bowdler Sharpe. The genus name Anurolimnas combines the negative prefix of Ancient Greek αν-/an- with ουρα/oura meaning "tail" and Modern Latin limnas meaning "rail". The specific castaneiceps combined the Latin castaneus meaning "chestnut-coloured" with -ceps meaning "-headed".

Two subspecies are recognised:

- A. c. coccineipes Olson, 1973 – south Colombia, northeast Ecuador
- A. c. castaneiceps (Sclater, PL & Salvin, 1869) – east Ecuador, east Peru, southwest Brazil and northwest Bolivia

== Description ==
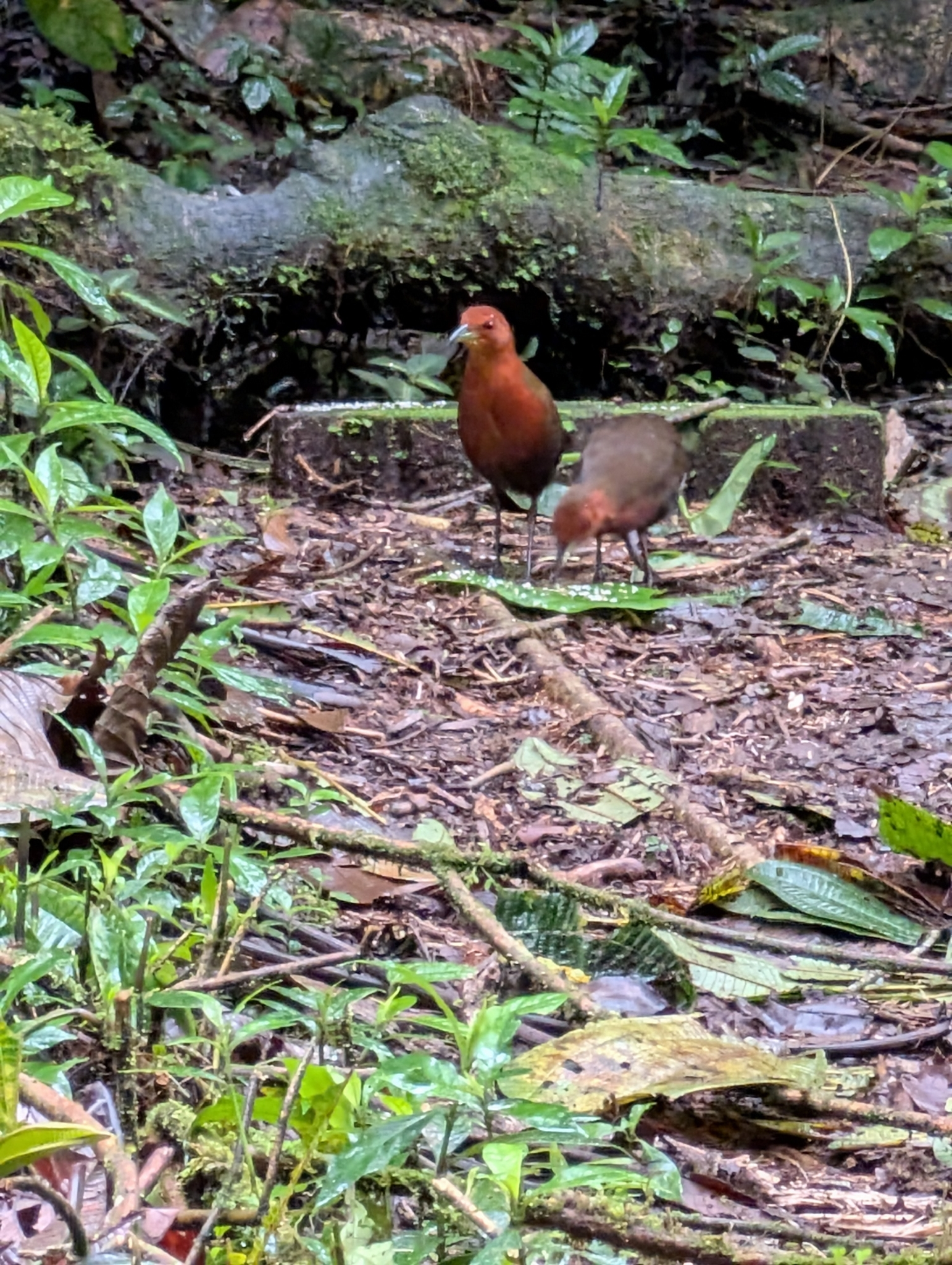
Two chestnut-headed crakes in Ecuador

The chestnut-headed crake is 19 to 21.5 cm (7.5 to 8.5 in) long. One female weighed 126 g (4.4 oz). The sexes are alike. Adults' bills have a mostly black maxilla that is greenish below the nostrils and a greenish mandible with a black tip. The nominate subspecies' forecrown, sides of the head and neck, and breast are bright rufous. Their throat is orange-rufous or light buff. Their crown, back, rump, wing coverts, belly, and vent area are brownish olive. Their legs and feet are dull brown or olivaceous. Immatures are duller; they are brown or brownish olive where the adult is rufous and their throat is pale grayish buff. Subspecies A. c. coccineipes has red legs and feet but very similar plumage to the nominate. Some authors state that it has greener (less brown) upperparts and tawny tones to the rufous areas, but others find no significant difference between the subspecies.

== Distribution and habitat ==
The nominate subspecies of chestnut-headed crake is found from southern Colombia south through eastern Ecuador into northern Peru. Its southern limit in Peru is the left bank of the Rio Napo and in Ecuador it is the same or perhaps somewhat beyond it. R. c. coccineipes is found from the Rio Napo (or vicinity) in Ecuador and Peru south into extreme northwestern Bolivia. A separate population is found in Brazil's Acre state. The species inhabits humid landscapes with a dense understory such as secondary forest, where it especially favors overgrown agricultural plots in tropical evergreen forest. Unlike most others of its family, it can be found far from water. In Colombia it is found up to 1,500 m (4,900 ft); in Ecuador it mostly occurs below 700 m (2,300 ft) but can be found as high as 1,000 m (3,300 ft). The chestnut-headed crake is a year-round resident throughout its range.

== Behavior ==
=== Feeding ===
The chestnut-headed crake forages by probing debris and rotten wood and flicking aside leaves while walking on the ground. It also pecks at similar substrates above the ground by stretching up. Its diet has not been documented but is assumed to be invertebrates and seeds.

=== Breeding ===
Almost nothing is known about the chestnut-headed crake's breeding biology. Its nesting season appears to include June.

=== Vocalization ===
The chestnut-headed crake has a loud melodic song described by one author as "a long (lasting up to 5 min) series of tri- or bisyllabic whistles: wee-hoohoo wee-hoohoo wee-hoohoo ...". Its aggressive call is "a quiet puttering sound".

== Conservation status ==
The IUCN has assessed the chestnut-headed crake as being of Least Concern, though its population size is not known and is believed to be decreasing. No immediate threats have been identified. It is considered uncommon in most of its range but "benefits from low levels of human disturbance, taking advantage of edge habitats around small garden plots."
