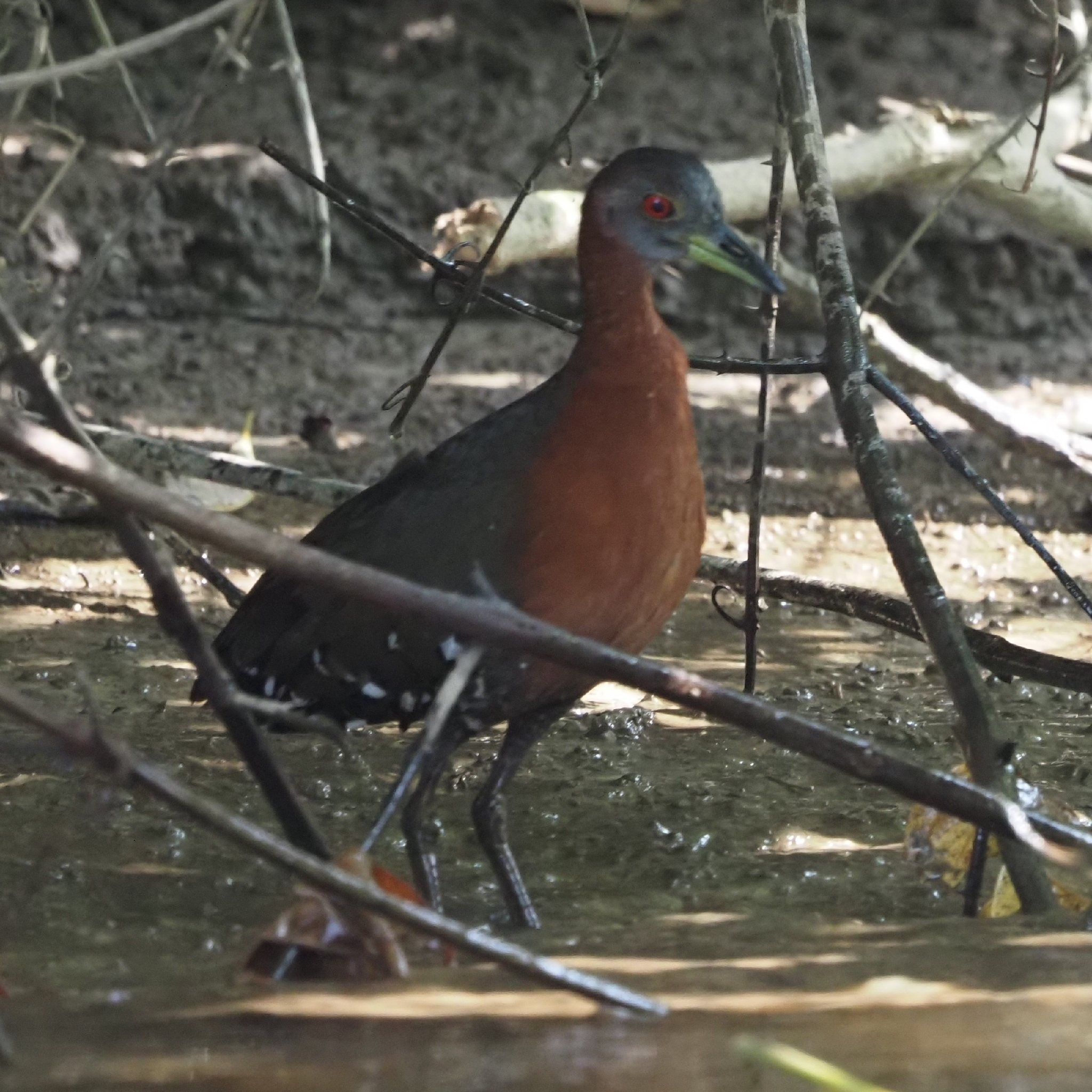

Conservation status
- Least Concern (IUCN 3.1)

Scientific classification
- Kingdom: Animalia
- Phylum: Chordata
- Class: Aves
- Order: Gruiformes
- Family: Rallidae
- Genus: Canirallus; Bonaparte, 1856
- Species: C. oculeus

Binomial name
- Canirallus oculeus (Hartlaub, 1855)

= Grey-throated rail =

Species of bird

The grey-throated rail (Canirallus oculeus) is a species of bird in the family Rallidae, the only member of the genus Canirallus. It is found in Cameroon, Central African Republic, Republic of the Congo, Democratic Republic of the Congo, Ivory Coast, Equatorial Guinea, Gabon, Ghana, Guinea, Liberia, Nigeria, and Sierra Leone.

The genus Canirallus was formerly placed in the family Sarothruridae. The genus was moved to Rallidae when a molecular genetic study published in 2019 found that the grey-throated rail was more closely related to Rallidae than it was to Sarothruridae.

This rail is 30 cm (12 in) in length and weighs 266 g (9.4 oz).

Its diet consists of skinks and various invertebrates.
