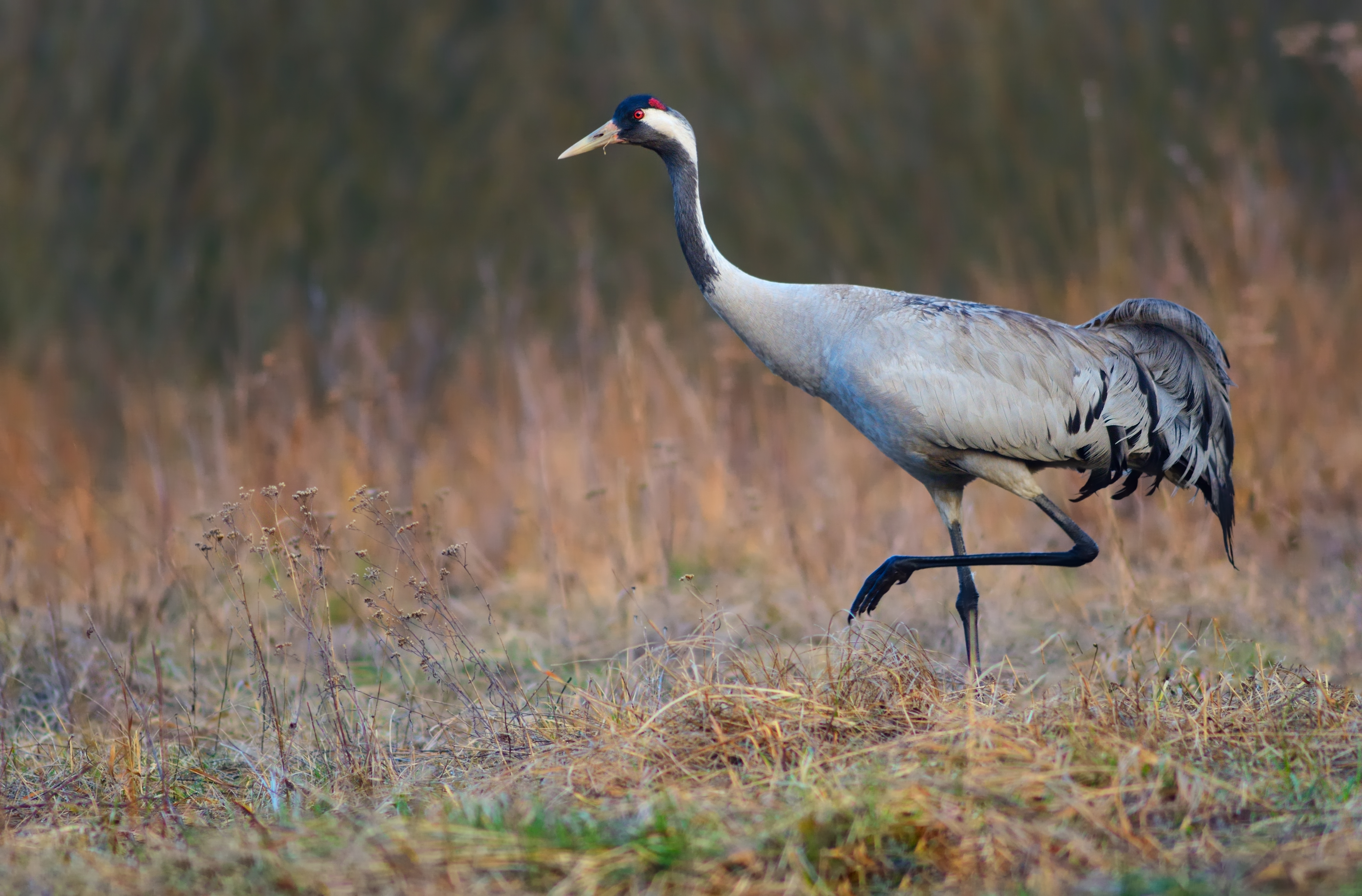
- Common crane, Grus grus

Scientific classification
- Kingdom: Animalia
- Phylum: Chordata
- Class: Aves
- Clade: Gruimorphae
- Order: Gruiformes; Bonaparte, 1854

Families
- Some 5–10 living, see article text.
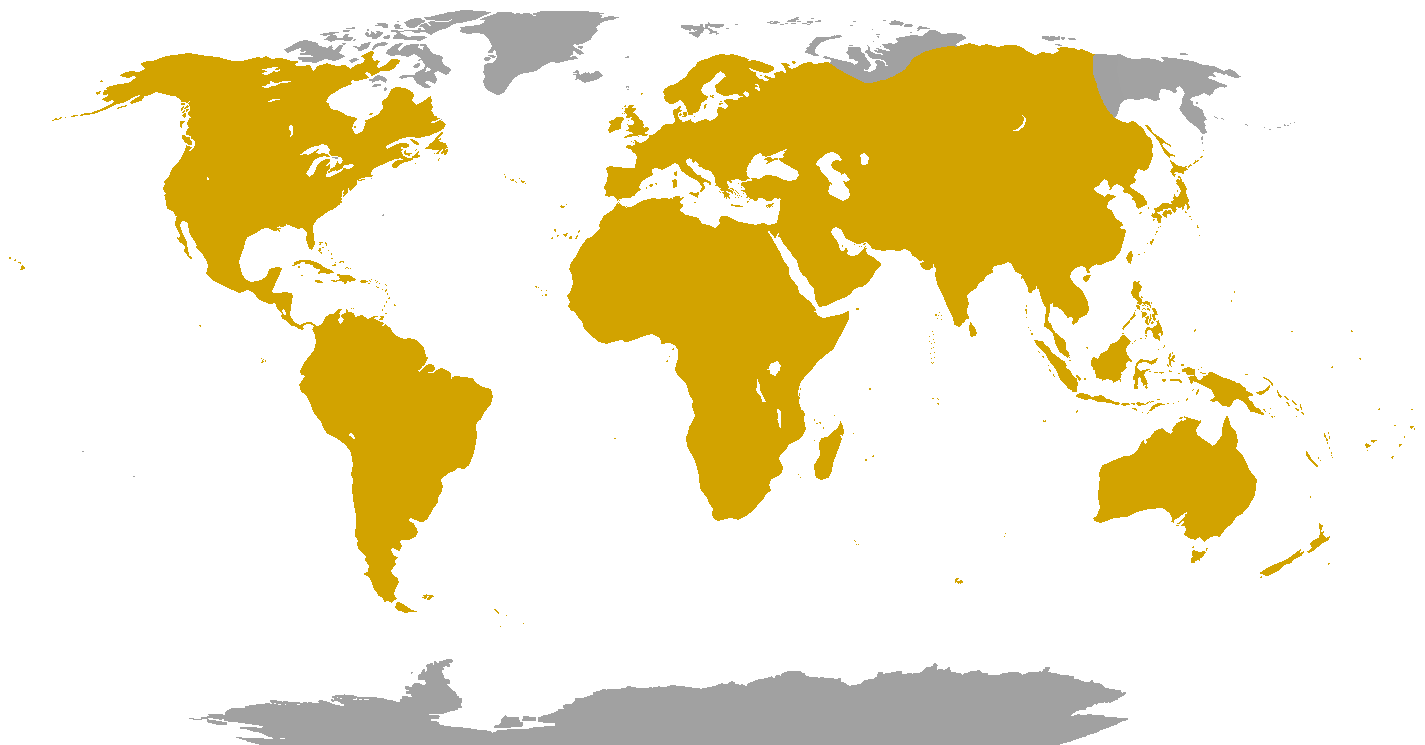
- Global distribution of the cranes and allies.

= Gruiformes =

Gruiformes Temporal range: Paleocene – Holocene, 60–0 Ma Possibly an earlier origin based on molecular clock

Order of birds

The Gruiformes are an order containing a considerable number of living and extinct bird families, with a widespread geographical diversity. Gruiform means 'crane form'.

Traditionally, a number of wading and terrestrial bird families that did not seem to belong to any other order were classified together as Gruiformes. These include 15 species of large cranes, about 145 species of smaller crakes and rails, as well as a variety of families comprising one to three extant species, such as the Heliornithidae, the limpkin (Aramidae), or the Psophiidae. Other birds have been placed in this order more out of necessity to place them somewhere; this has caused the expanded Gruiformes to lack distinctive apomorphies. Recent studies indicate that these "odd Gruiformes" are if at all only loosely related to the cranes, rails, and relatives ("core Gruiformes").

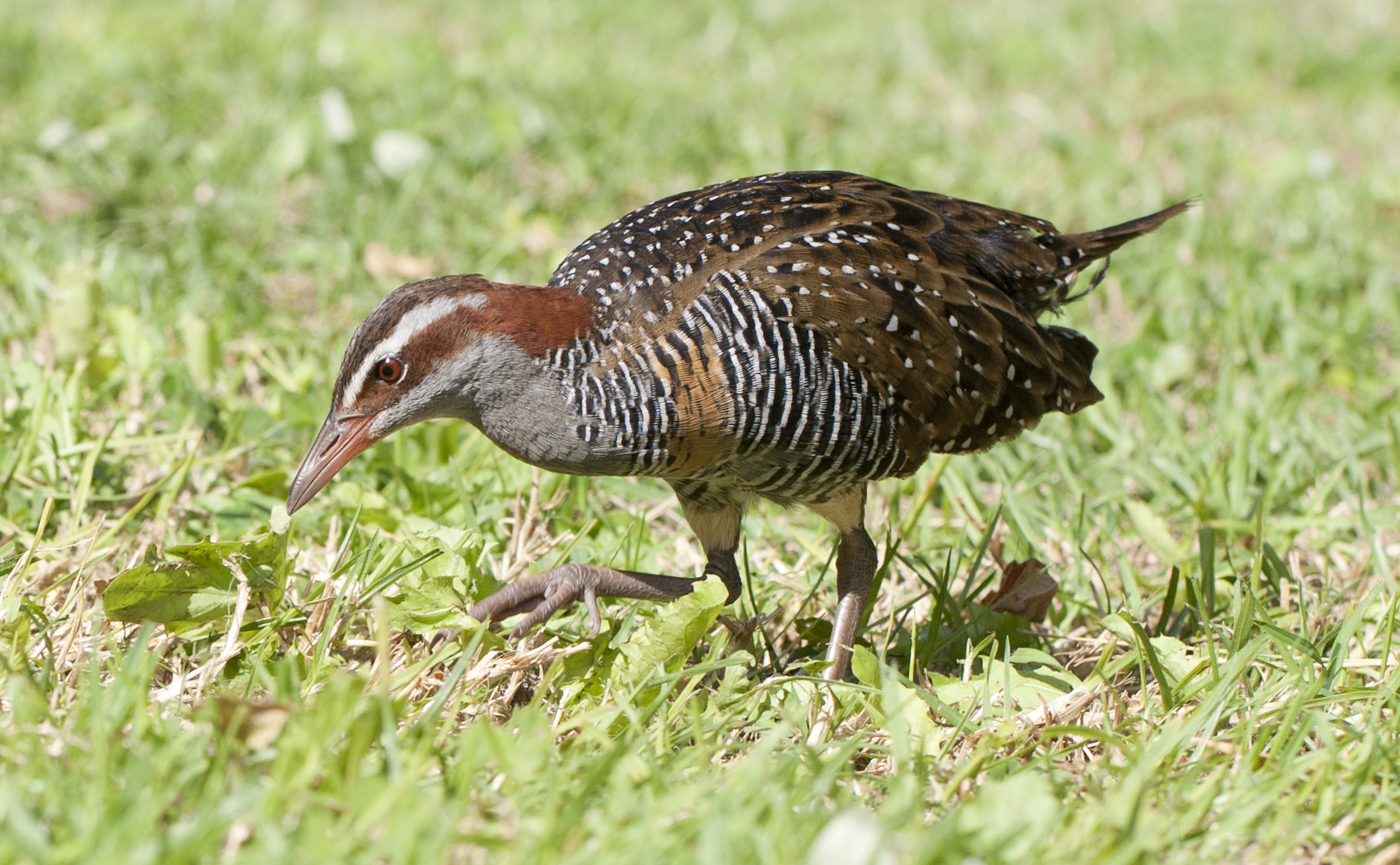
Rails are one of the most widespread Gruiformes

== Systematics ==
There are only two suprafamilial clades (natural groups) among the birds traditionally classified as Gruiformes. Rails (Rallidae), flufftails (Sarothruridae), finfoots and sungrebe (Heliornithidae), adzebills (Aptornithidae), trumpeters (Psophiidae), limpkin (Aramidae), and cranes (Gruidae) compose the suborder Grues and are termed "core-Gruiformes". These are the only true Gruiformes. The suborder Eurypygae includes the kagu (Rhynochetidae) and sunbittern (Eurypygidae). These are not even remotely related to Grues. The families of mesites or roatelos (Mesitornithidae), button-quails (Turnicidae), Australian plains-wanderer (Pedionomidae), seriemas & terror birds (Cariamidae), and bustards (Otididae) each represent distinct lineages. Many families known only from fossils have been assigned to the Gruiformes, e.g., Ergilornithidae, Phorusrhacidae, Messelornithidae, Eogruidae, Idiornithidae, Bathornithidae, to name just a few (see below). Though some of these are superficially 'crane-like' and the possibility exists that some may even be related to extant families traditionally included in the Gruiformes, there are no completely extinct families that can be confidently assigned to core-Gruiformes.

The traditional order Gruiformes was established by the influential German avian comparative anatomist Max Fürbringer (1888). Over the decades, many ornithologists suggested that members of the order were in fact more closely related to other groups (reviewed by Olson 1985, Sibley and Ahlquist 1990). For example, it was thought that sunbittern might be related to herons and that seriemas might be related to cuckoos. Olson and Steadman (1981) were first to correctly disband any of the traditional Gruiformes. They recognized that the Australian plains-wanderer (family Pedionomidae) was actually a member of the shorebirds (order Charadriiformes) based on skeletal characters. This was confirmed by Sibley and Ahlquist (1990) based on DNA–DNA hybridization and subsequently by Paton et al. (2003), Paton and Baker (2006) and Fain and Houde (2004, 2006). Sibley and Ahlquist furthermore removed button-quails (Turnicidae) from the Gruiformes based on large DNA–DNA hybridization distances to other supposed Gruiformes. However, it was not until the work of Paton et al. (2004) and Fain and Houde (2004, 2006) that the correct placement of buttonquails within the shorebirds (order Charadriiformes) was documented on the basis of phylogenetic analysis of multiple genetic loci. Using 12S ribosomal DNA sequences, Houde et al. (1997) were the first to present molecular genetic evidence of gruiform polyphyly, although apparently they were not convinced by it. However, on the basis of numerous additional sequence data, it has been shown decisively that the traditionally recognized Gruiformes consist of five to seven unrelated clades (Fain and Houde 2004, Ericson et al. 2006, Hackett et al. 2008).

Fain and Houde (2004) proposed that Neoaves are divisible into two clades, Metaves and Coronaves, although it has been suggested from the start that Metaves may be paraphyletic (Fain and Houde 2004, Ericson et al. 2006, Hackett et al. 2008). Sunbittern, kagu, and mesites all group within Metaves but all the other lineages of "Gruiformes" group either with a collection of waterbirds or landbirds within Coronaves. This division has been upheld by the combined analysis of as many as 30 independent loci (Ericson et al. 2006, Hackett et al. 2008), but is dependent on the inclusion of one or two specific loci in the analyses. One locus, i.e., mitochondrial DNA, contradicts the strict monophyly of Coronaves (Morgan-Richards et al. 2008), but phylogeny reconstruction based on mitochondrial DNA is complicated by the fact that few families have been studied, the sequences are heavily saturated (with back mutations) at deep levels of divergence, and they are plagued by strong base composition bias.

The kagu and sunbittern are one another's closest relatives. It had been proposed (Cracraft 2001) that they and the recently extinct adzebills (family Aptornithidae) from New Zealand constitute a distinct Gondwanan lineage. However, sunbittern and kagu are believed to have diverged from one another long after the break-up of Gondwanaland and the adzebills are in fact members of the Grues (Houde et al. 1997, Houde 2009). The seriemas and bustards represent distinct lineages within neoavian waterbirds.

== Phylogeny ==
- Gruiformes
  - - Psophiidae – trumpeters (3 species)
    - - Aramidae – limpkin
      - Gruidae – cranes (15 species)
  - - Rallidae – rails, crakes and coots (152 species)
    - - Heliornithidae – finfoots (3 species)
      - Sarothruridae – flufftails (15 species)

Phylogeny of the extant Gruiformes.

Gruiformes

- Family †Songziidae Hou, 1990
  - Genus †Songzia Hou, 1990
- Suborder Grui
  - Superfamily Gruoidea Vigors, 1825
    - Family †Geranoididae Wetmore, 1933
    - Family †Parvigruidae Mayr, 2005
      - Genus †Parvigrus Mayr, 2005
      - Genus †Rupelrallus Fischer, 1997
    - Family Aramidae Bonaparte, 1854 (limpkin)
      - Genus †Badistornis Wetmore, 1940
      - Genus Aramus Vieillot, 1816 [Courlili, Courliri Buffon, 1781; Notherodius Wagler, 1827] (limpkins)
    - Family Psophiidae Bonaparte, 1831 (trumpeters)
      - Genus Psophia Linnaeus, 1758
    - Family †Eogruidae Wetmore, 1934
      - Genus †Sonogrus Kuročkin, 1981
      - Genus †Eogrus Wetmore, 1932 [Progrus Bendukidze, 1971]
      - Subfamily †Ergilornithinae
        - Genus †Ergilornis Kozlova, 1960
        - Genus †Amphipelargus Lydekker, 1891
        - Genus †Urmiornis Mecquenem, 1908
    - Family Gruidae (cranes)
      - Genus †Camusia Seguí, 2002
      - Subfamily Balearicinae Brasil, 1913
        - Genus †Aramornis Wetmore, 1926
        - Genus †Geranopsis Lydekker, 1871
        - Genus †Eobalearica Gureev, 1949
        - Genus Balearica Brisson, 1760 [Geranarchus Gloger, 1842] (crowned cranes)
      - Subfamily Gruinae Vigors, 1825
        - Genus †"Grus" conferta Miller & Sibley, 1942 [Olson & Rasmussen, 2001]
        - Genus †"Probalearica" mongolica Kurochkin, 1985
        - Genus †Palaeogrus Portis, 1885 [Palaeogrus Salvadori, 1884 nomen nudum]
        - Genus Antigone (Linnaeus, 1758)
        - Genus Leucogeranus (Pallas, 1773)
        - Genus Grus Brisson, 1760 non Moehring, 1758 [Anthropoides Vieillot, 1816; Bugeranus Gloger, 1841; Megalornis Gray, 1841; Leucogeranus Bonaparte, 1855; Mathewsena Iredale, 1914; Mathewsia Iredale, 1911; Limnogeranus Sharpe, 1893; Laomedontia Reichenbach, 1852; Philorchemon Gloger, 1842; Scops Gray, 1840 non Moehring, 1758 non Bruennich, 1772 npn Savigny, 1809] (cranes)
- Suborder Ralli
  - Family †Aptornithidae (adzebills)
    - Genus †Aptornis Owen, 1844
  - Family †Nesotrochidae Stervander, Chen, Feng & Mayr, 2025 (West Indian cave-rails)
    - Genus †Nesotrochis Wetmore, 1918
  - Family Sarothruridae (flufftails)
    - Genus Mentocrex Peters, 1933 (wood rails)
    - Genus Sarothrura Heine, 1890 non Hasselt, 1823 [Corethrura Reichenbach, 1849 non Hope, 1843 non Gray, 1846; Daseioura Penhallurick, 2003] (flufftails)
  - Family Heliornithidae Gray, 1841 (finfoots and sungrebe)
    - Genus Heliopais Sharpe, 1893 (Asian/masked finfoots)
    - Genus Podica Lesson, 1831 [Rhigelura Wagler, 1832; Podoa Bonaparte, 1857 non Illiger, 1811] (African finfoots)
    - Genus Heliornis Bonnaterre, 1791 [Podoa Illiger, 1811 non Bonaparte, 1857; Plotoides Brookes, 1830; Podia Swainson, 1837] (sungrebe, American finfoot)
  - Family Rallidae (crakes, moorhens, gallinules, and rails)
    - Genus †Aletornis Marsh, 1872 [Protogrus]
    - Genus †Australlus Worthy & Boles, 2011
    - Genus †Baselrallus De Pietri & Mayr, 2014
    - Genus †Belgirallus Mayr & Smith, 2001
    - Genus †Capellirallus Falla, 1954 (snipe-billed rail)
    - Genus †Creccoides Shufeldt, 1892
    - Genus †Eocrex Wetmore, 1931
    - Genus †Euryonotus Mercerat, 1897
    - Genus †Fulicaletornis Lambrecht, 1933
    - Genus †Hovacrex Brodkorb, 1965 (Hova gallinule)
    - Genus †Ibidopsis Lydekker, 1891
    - Genus †Latipons Harrison & Walker, 1979
    - Genus †Miofulica Lambrecht, 1933
    - Genus †Miorallus Lambrecht, 1933
    - Genus †Nesophalaris Brodkorb & Dawson, 1962
    - Genus †Palaeoaramides Lambrecht, 1933
    - Genus †Palaeorallus Wetmore, 1931
    - Genus †Paraortygometra Lambrecht, 1933
    - Genus †Parvirallus Harrison & Walker, 1979
    - Genus †Pastushkinia Zelenkov, 2013
    - Genus †Quercyrallus Lambrecht, 1933
    - Genus †Rallicrex Lambrecht, 1933
    - Genus †Rhenanorallus Mayr, 2010
    - Genus †Vitirallus Worthy, 2004 (Viti Levu rails)
    - Genus †Wanshuina Hou, 1994
    - Genus †Youngornis Yeh, 1981
    - Genus †Rallidae gen. et sp. indet. [Fulica podagrica (partim)] (Barbados rail)
    - Genus †Rallidae gen. et sp. indet. (Easter Island rail)
    - Genus †Rallidae gen. et sp. indet. (Fernando de Noronha rail)
    - Genus †Rallidae gen. et sp. indet. (Tahitian "goose")
    - Genus †Rallidae gen. et sp. indet. (Bokaak "bustard")
    - Genus †Rallidae gen. et sp. indet. ('Amsterdam Island' rail)
    - Genus Rougetius Bonaparte, 1856 (Rouget's Rails)
    - Subfamily Rallinae Rafinesque, 1815
      - Genus †Pleistorallus Worthy, 1997 (Fleming's rails)
      - Genus Anurolimnas Sharpe, 1893 (Chestnut-headed Crakes)
      - Genus Biensis (Madagascan Rails)
      - Genus Rallicula Schlegel, 1871 [Corethruropsis Salvadori, 1876] (forest-rails)
      - Genus Rallus Linnaeus, 1758 [†Epirallus Miller, 1942]
      - Genus †Aphanapteryx von Frauenfeld, 1868 [Pezocrex Hachisuka, 1953] (Mauritius/Red rails)
      - Genus †Erythromachus Milne-Edwards, 1873 (Rodriquez rails)
      - Genus Dryolimnas Sharpe, 1893
      - Genus Crex Bechstein, 1803 [Crecopsis Sharpe, 1893] (greater crakes)
      - Genus Lewinia Gray, 1855 [Aramidopsis Sharpe, 1893; Donacias Heine & Reichenow, 1890; Hyporallus Iredale & Mathews, 1926]
      - Genus Canirallus Bonaparte, 1856 (grey-throated rail)
      - Genus Gymnocrex Salvadori, 1875 (bare-faced rails)
      - Genus Gallirallus Lafresnaye, 1841 [Tricholimnas Sharpe, 1893; Nesoclopeus Peters, 1932; Cabalus Hutton, 1874; Habropteryx Stresemann, 1932; Eulabeornis Gould, 1844; †Diaphorapteryx Forbes, 1893; Hypotaenidia Reichenbach, 1853; Sylvestrornis Mathews, 1928]
    - Subfamily Gallinulinae Gray, 1840
      - Tribe Pardirallini Livezey, 1998 [Aramidinae] (Wood-rails & allies)
        - Genus Pardirallus Bonaparte, 1856 [Ortygonax Heine, 1890]
        - Genus Mustelirallus Bonaparte, 1858 [Neocrex Sclater & Salvin, 1869; Cyanolimnas Barbour & Peters, 1927]
        - Genus Amaurolimnas Sharpe 1893 (Rufous rails; Uniform crakes)
        - Genus Aramides Pucheran, 1845
      - Tribe Gallinulini Gray, 1840 [Fulicarinae (Nitzsch, 1820) sensu Livezey, 1998]
        - Genus Tribonyx Du Bus de Gisignies, 1840 [Brachyptrallus Lafresnaye, 1840; Microtribonyx Sharpe, 1893] (native-hens)
        - Genus Porzana Vieillot, 1816 [Limnobaenus Sundevall, 1872; Phalaridion Kaup, 1829; Porzanoidea Mathews, 1912; Porzanoides Condon, 1975; Rallites Pucheran, 1845; Schoenocrex Roberts, 1922; Porphyriops Pucheran, 1845]
        - Genus Paragallinula Sangster, García-R & Trewick, 2015 (Lesser Moorhen)
        - Genus Gallinula Brisson, 1760 [Hydrogallina Lacépède, 1799; Stagnicola Brehm, 1831; Porphyriornis Allen, 1892 Pareudiastes Hartlaub & Finsch, 1871 Edithornis]
        - Genus Fulica Linnaeus, 1758 [†Palaeolimnas Forbes, 1893]
    - Subfamily Porphyrioninae Reichenbach, 1849
      - Tribe Porphyrionini Reichenbach, 1849 (Purple gallinules & swamphens)
        - Genus †Aphanocrex Wetmore, 1963 (St. Helena swamphens)
        - Genus Porphyrio Brisson, 1760 [Notornis Owen, 1848]
      - Tribe Himantornithini Bonaparte, 1856 (Bush-hens & Waterhens)
        - Genus Himantornis Hartlaub, 1855 (Nkulenga rails)
        - Genus Megacrex D'Albertis & Salvadori, 1879 (New Guinea Flightless Rails)
        - Genus Aenigmatolimnas (Striped Crakes)
        - Genus Gallicrex Blyth, 1852 [Gallinulopha Bonaparte, 1854; Hypnodes Reichenbach, 1853] (Watercocks)
        - Genus Amaurornis Reichenbach, 1853 [Erythra Reichenbach, 1853; Pisynolimnas Heine & Reichenow, 1890; Poliolimnas Sharpe, 1893] (Bush-hen)
      - Tribe Zaporniini Des Murs, 1860 (Old world crakes)
        - Genus Rallina Gray, 1846 [Euryzona Gray, 1855; Tomirdus Mathews, 1912] (chestnut-rails)
        - Genus Zapornia Stephens, 1824 [Limnocorax Peters, 1854; Limnobaenus; Corethrura Grey, 1846]
      - Tribe Laterallini Tif, 2014 (New world crakes)
        - Genus Micropygia Bonaparte, 1856 (Ocellated Crakes)
        - Genus Rufirallus (russet-crowned crake)
        - Genus Laterallus Gray, 1855 (ruddy crakes)
        - Genus Coturnicops Gray, 1855 (barred-backed crakes)
        - Genus Hapalocrex (Yellow-breasted Crakes)
        - Genus Limnocrex
        - Genus Mundia Bourne, Ashmole & Simmons, 2003 (Ascension Island Crakes)
        - Genus Creciscus Cabanis, 1857 [Atlantisia Lowe, 1923] (blackish crakes)

When considered to be monophyletic, it was assumed that Gruiformes was among the more ancient of avian lineages. The divergence of "gruiforms" among "Metaves" and "Coronaves" is proposed to be the first divergence among Neoaves, far predating the Cretaceous–Paleogene extinction event c. 66 mya (Houde 2009). No unequivocal basal gruiforms are known from the fossil record. However, there are several genera that are not unequivocally assignable to the known families and that may occupy a more basal position:

- Propelargus (Late Eocene/Early Oligocene of Quercy, France) – cariamid or idornithid
- Rupelrallus (Early Oligocene of Germany) – rallid? parvigruid?
- Badistornis (Brule Middle Oligocene of Shannon County, Missouri) – aramid?
- Probalearica (Late Oligocene? – Middle Pliocene of Florida, France?, Moldavia and Mongolia) – gruid? A nomen dubium?
- "Gruiformes" gen. et sp. indet. MNZ S42623 (Bathans Early/Middle Miocene of Otago, New Zealand) – Aptornithidae?
- Aramornis (Sheep Creek Middle Miocene of Snake Creek Quarries, U.S.) – gruid? aramid?
- Euryonotus (Pleistocene of Argentina) – rallid?

Other even more enigmatic fossil birds and five living families are occasionally suggested to belong into this order, such as the proposed Late Cretaceous family Laornithidae and the following taxa:

- Family †Gastornithidae (diatrymas) (fossil)
- Family †Messelornithidae (Messel-birds)
- Family †Salmilidae (fossil) – distinct order (Cariamiformes)
- Family †Geranoididae (fossil) – distinct order (Cariamiformes); however, Mayr (2016) argued they might be members of Gruiformes, specifically stem group representatives of the Gruoidea.
- Family †Bathornithidae (fossil) – distinct order (Cariamiformes)
- Family †Idiornithidae (fossil) – distinct order (Cariamiformes)
- Family †Phorusrhacidae (terror birds) (fossil) – distinct order (Cariamiformes)
- Family Cariamidae (seriemas) – Neoavian landbirds – distinct order (Cariamiformes)
- Family Otididae (bustards) – Neoavian waterbirds – distinct order
- Family Eurypygidae (sunbittern) – prospective "Metaves" – new order Eurypygiformes together with kagu
- Family Rhynochetidae (kagu) – prospective "Metaves" – new order Eurypygiformes together with sunbittern
- Family Mesitornithidae (mesites, roatelos, monias) prospective "Metaves" – distinct order
- Family Turnicidae (buttonquails) moved to already existing order Charadriiformes together with plains wanderer
- Family Pedionomidae (plains wanderer) moved to already existing order Charadriiformes together with buttonquails
- Horezmavis (Bissekty Late Cretaceous of Kyzyl Kum, Uzbekistan)
- Telmatornis (Navesink Late Cretaceous?)
- Amitabha (Bridger middle Eocene of Forbidden City, Wyoming) – rallid?
- Eobalearica (Ferghana Late? Eocene of Ferghana, Uzbekistan) – gruid?
- "Phasianus" alfhildae (Washakie B Late Eocene of Haystack Butte, U.S.)
- Talantatos (Late Eocene of Paris Bain, France)
- Telecrex (Irdin Manha Late Eocene of Chimney Butte, China) – rallid?
- Neornithes incerta sedis (Late Paleocene/Early Eocene of Ouled Abdoun Basin, Morocco)
- Aminornis (Deseado Early Oligocene of Rio Deseado, Argentina) – aramid?
- Loncornis (Deseado Early Oligocene of Rio Deseado, Argentina) – aramid?
- Riacama (Deseado Early Oligocene of Argentina)
- Smiliornis (Deseado Early Oligocene of Argentina)
- Pseudolarus (Deseado Early Oligocene – Miocene of Argentina) – gruiform?
- Gnotornis (Brule Late Oligocene of Shannon County, Missouri) – aramid?
- Anisolornis (Santa Cruz Middle Miocene of Karaihen, Argentina) – aramid?
- Occitaniavis – cariamid or idiornithid, includes Geranopsis elatus

== See also ==
- List of Gruiformes by population
