= Bailey's shrew =

Conservation status
- Least Concern (IUCN 3.1)

Scientific classification
- Kingdom: Animalia
- Phylum: Chordata
- Class: Mammalia
- Order: Eulipotyphla
- Family: Soricidae
- Genus: Crocidura
- Species: C. baileyi

Binomial name
- Crocidura baileyi Osgood, 1936
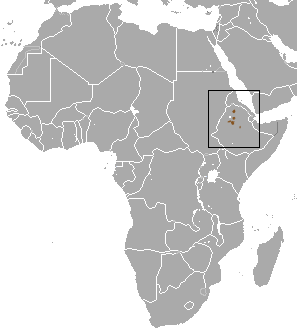
- Bailey's shrew range

Species of mammal

Bailey's shrew (Crocidura baileyi) is a species of mammal in the family Soricidae. The name honours American naturalist and museum director Alfred Marshall Bailey. It is endemic to Ethiopia. Its natural habitat is subtropical or tropical high-elevation grassland.
