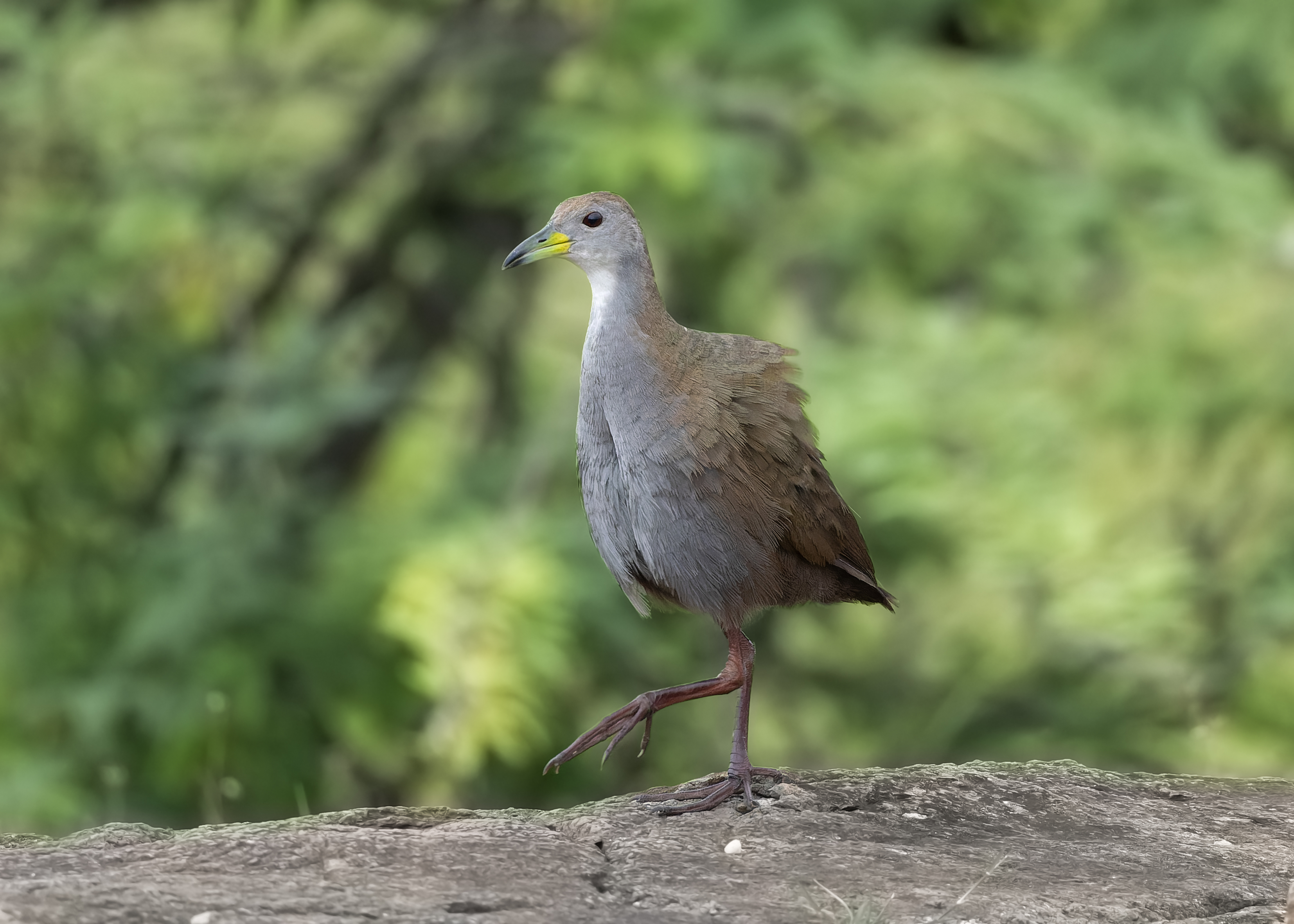
- In Bhigwan, Maharashtra, India

Conservation status
- Least Concern (IUCN 3.1)

Scientific classification
- Kingdom: Animalia
- Phylum: Chordata
- Class: Aves
- Order: Gruiformes
- Family: Rallidae
- Genus: Zapornia
- Species: Z. akool

Binomial name
- Zapornia akool (Sykes, 1832)

Synonyms
- Amaurornis akool (Sykes, 1832)

= Brown crake =

Species of bird

The brown crake (Zapornia akool), or brown bush-hen, is a waterbird in the rail and crake family (Rallidae) found in South Asia. The species name, akool, is of uncertain origin. It may come from Hindu mythology, or it may be a derivation of the Sinhalese word kukkula, which is used for both moorhen and watercock.

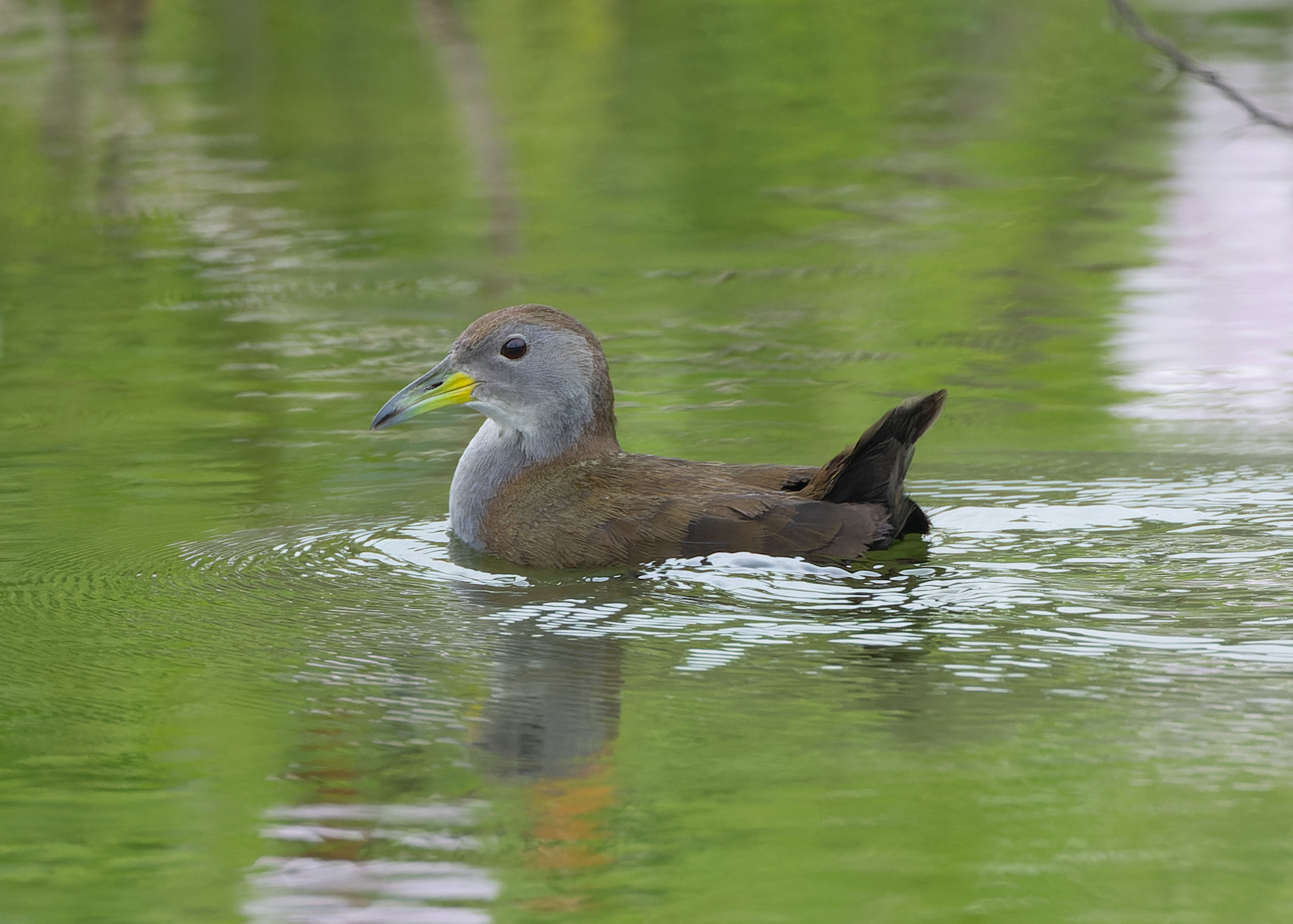
Zapornia akool swimming in Bhigwan, Maharashtra, India.
