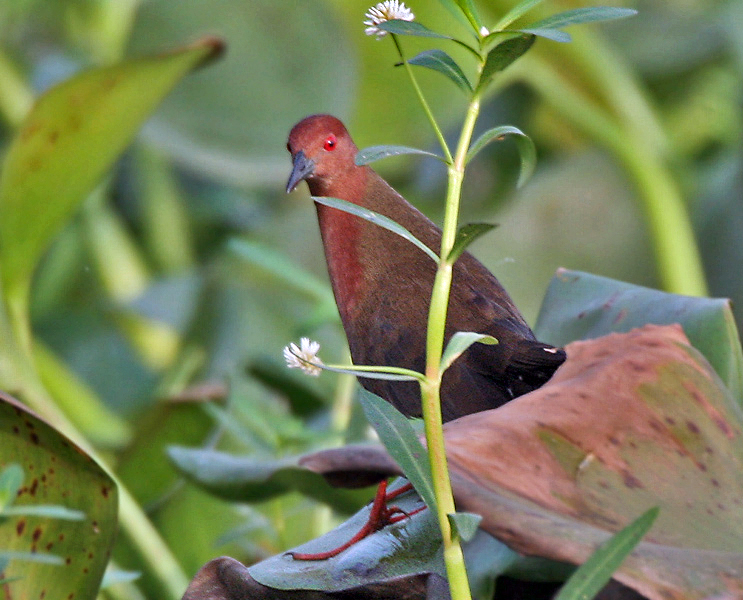
- In Kolkata, West Bengal, India

Conservation status
- Least Concern (IUCN 3.1)

Scientific classification
- Kingdom: Animalia
- Phylum: Chordata
- Class: Aves
- Order: Gruiformes
- Family: Rallidae
- Genus: Zapornia
- Species: Z. fusca

Binomial name
- Zapornia fusca (Linnaeus, 1766)

Synonyms
- Rallus fuscus Linnaeus, 1766; Porzana fusca

= Ruddy-breasted crake =

Species of bird

ruddy-breasted crake (Zapornia fusca) Call - Recorded from Koottanad Kerala India

The ruddy-breasted crake (Zapornia fusca), or ruddy crake, is a waterbird in the rail and crake family Rallidae, formerly included in the genus Porzana.

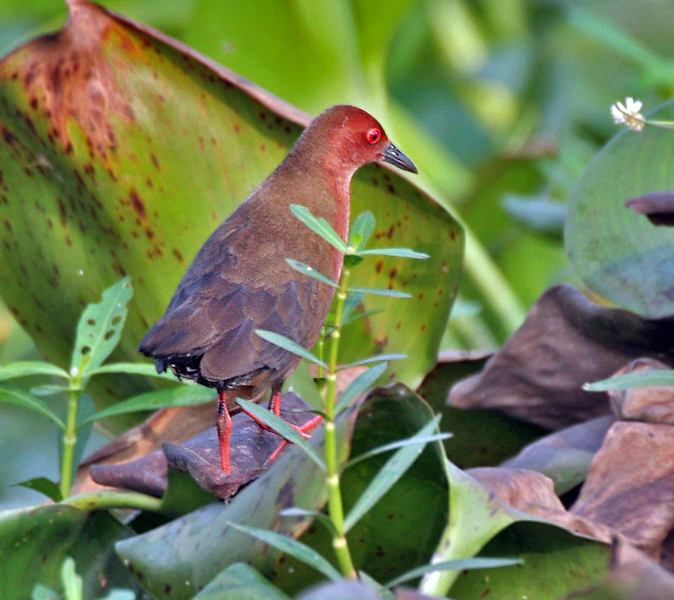
In Kolkata, West Bengal, India

Its breeding habitat is swamps and similar wet areas across South Asia from the Indian subcontinent east to south China, Japan and Indonesia. It has been recorded as a vagrant from the Australian territory of Christmas Island. It is mainly a permanent resident throughout its range, but some northern populations migrate further south in winter.

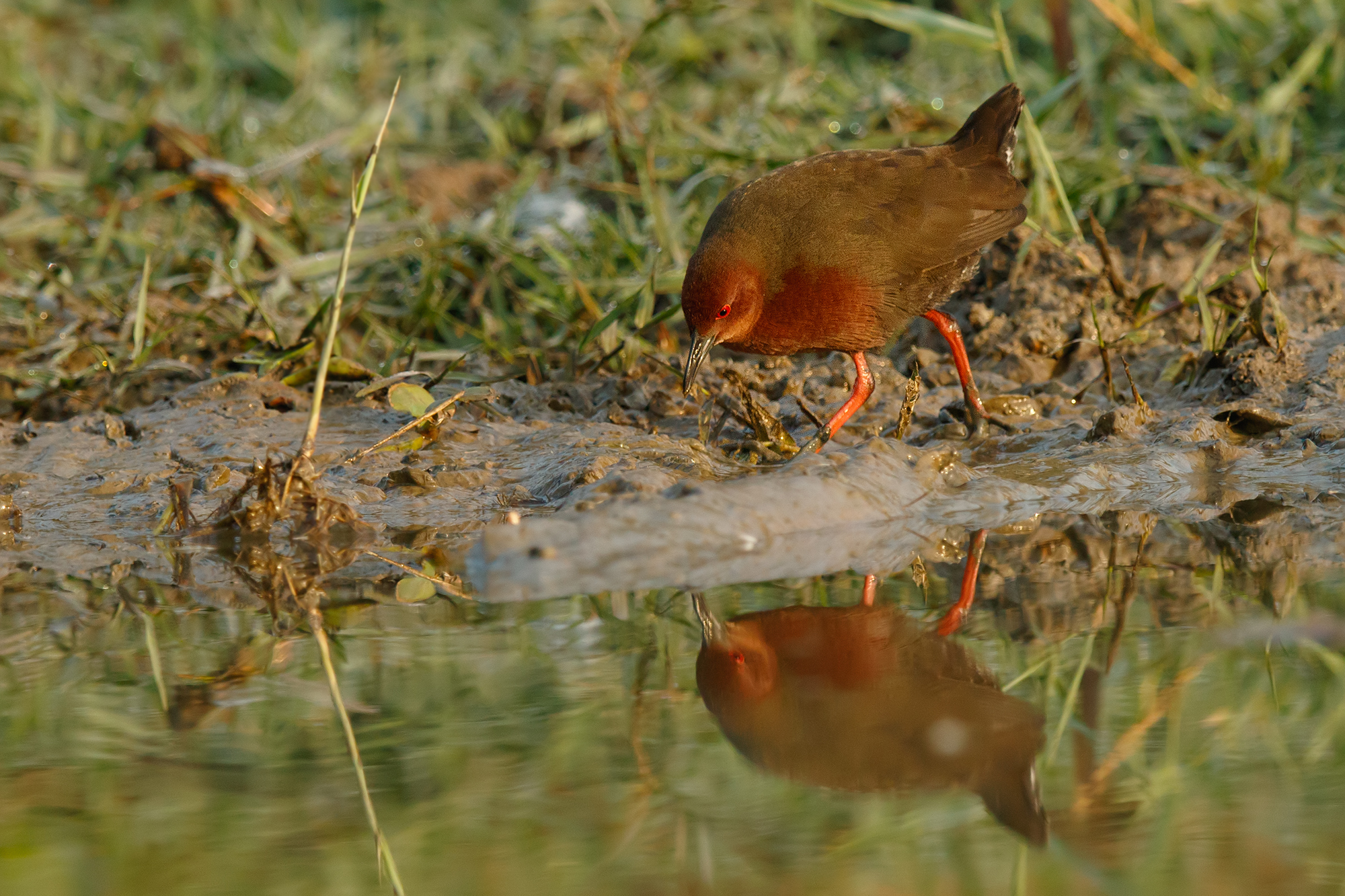
Ruddy-breasted Crake in Manglajodi, Odisha

This crake nests in a dry location on the ground in marsh vegetation, laying 6-9 eggs.

The ruddy-breasted crake is about 22–23 cm long. The body is flattened laterally to allow easier passage through the reeds or undergrowth. It has long toes and a short tail. The back is pale brown, the head and underparts chestnut, and with white barring on the flanks and undertail. The bill is yellowish, and the eyes, legs, and feet are red.

The sexes are similar, but juveniles are dark brown with some white spotting.

These birds probe in mud or shallow water and also pick up food by sight. They forage for shoots, berries and insects, as well as large snails, which they eat by using their bills to peck through the hard shell.

Ruddy-breasted crakes are territorial, but are quite secretive, hiding amongst grassy shrubs and bushes when disturbed.
