= Alfred Marshall Bailey =

North American ornithologist

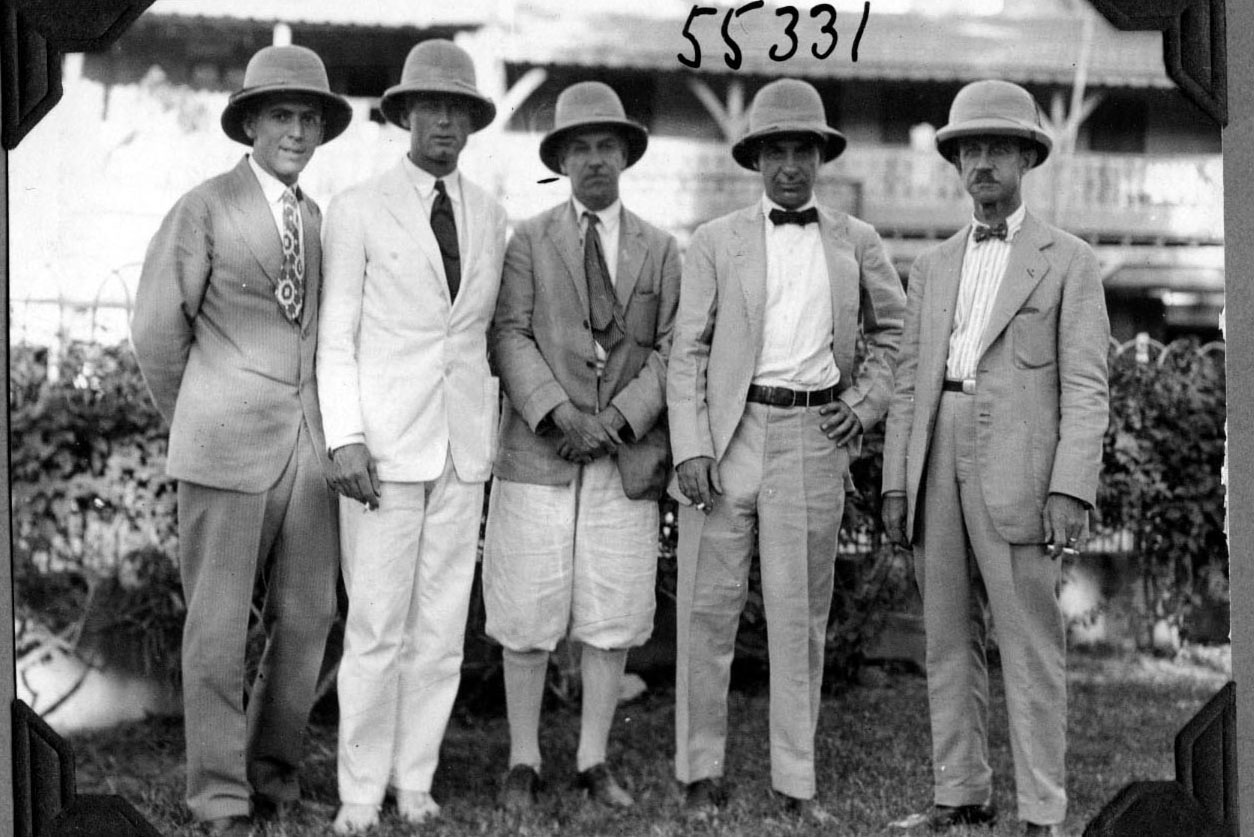
Alfred Marshall Bailey (far left) in 1927. Abyssinian Expedition.

Alfred Marshall Bailey (February 18, 1894 – February 25, 1978) was an American ornithologist who was associated with the Denver Museum of Natural History (now the Denver Museum of Nature and Science) in Colorado for most of his working life.

== Early years ==
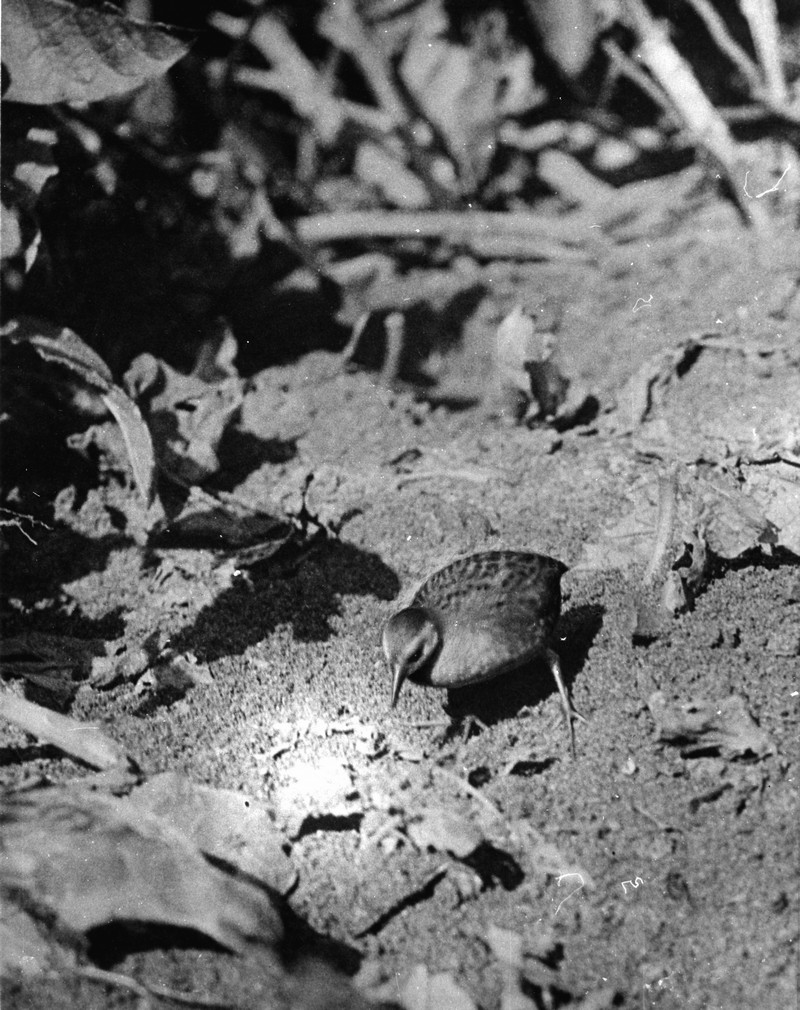
1913 photo by Bailey of the now extinct Laysan rail

Bailey was born in Iowa City, Iowa, where he went to school and then attended the University of Iowa. While a student there he participated in a three-month scientific expedition to Laysan, one of the Northwestern Hawaiian Islands.

== Career ==
After graduation in 1916, Bailey served as curator of birds and mammals at the Louisiana State Museum in New Orleans (1916–1919). From 1919 to 1921 he was involved in surveying south-eastern Alaska for the Bureau of Biological Survey (later to become the United States Fish and Wildlife Service), followed by a curatorial stint at the Denver Museum (1921–1926). From 1926 to 1927 he was on the staff of the Field Museum of Natural History in Chicago, during which period he took part in an expedition to the Semien Mountains of Ethiopia. From 1927 to 1936 he was Director of the Chicago Academy of Sciences.

=== Denver Museum ===
Bailey returned to the Denver Museum as Director in 1936, a position he served in for over thirty years, eventually retiring in 1969 at the age of 75. He was a proponent of fieldwork, over the years leading or taking part in several further expeditions to various parts of the world, including the Arctic, Siberia, Mexico, Pacific islands, and New Zealand's subantarctic Campbell Island. He was also a popularizer of science and a skilled photographer, producing the Denver "Museum Pictorial" series of booklets, and contributing articles to magazines such as National Geographic and Natural History.

== Honours ==
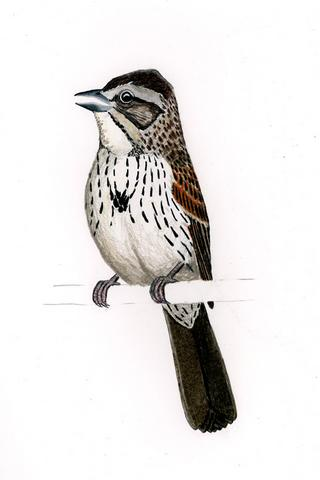
Sierra Madre sparrow (Xenospiza baileyi)

Formal recognition of Bailey's achievements include:

- 1941 – Fellowship of the American Ornithologists' Union
- 1944 – Doctor of Science, Norwich University
- 1954 – Doctor of Public Service, University of Denver
- 1961 – Malcolm Glenn Wyer Award for distinguished service in adult education
- 1967 – Regis College Civis Princeps Award

Bailey died in Denver at the age of 84. He is honoured in the scientific name of the Sierra Madre sparrow (Xenospiza baileyi), collected by him in Mexico and described by Outram Bangs in 1931, as well as in the name of Bailey's shrew (Crocidura baileyi) of which he collected the type specimen in Ethiopia, to which it is endemic. He is commemorated in the name of the Denver Museum's Alfred M. Bailey Library & Archives and also the Alfred M. Bailey Bird Nesting Area in Summit County, Colorado.

== Publications ==
Among some 200 publications authored or coauthored by Bailey are:

- Bailey, Alfred (1926–1927). Chicago Daily News Abyssinian Expedition. Field Museum of Natural History.
- 1948 – Birds of arctic Alaska. Popular Series 8, Colorado Museum of Natural History
- 1950 – Nature photography with miniature cameras. Museum Pictorial 1, Denver Museum of Natural History.
- 1952 – Laysan and black-footed albatrosses. Museum Pictorial 6, Denver Museum of Natural History.
- 1953 – The Red Crossbills of Colorado. Museum Pictorial 9, Denver Museum of Natural History. (With R. J. Niedrach and A. Lang Baily).
- 1954 – Canton Island. Museum Pictorial 10, Denver Museum of Natural History. (With R. C. Murphy and R. J. Niedrach).
- 1955 – Birds of New Zealand. Museum Pictorial 11, Denver Museum of Natural History.
- 1956 – Birds of Midway and Laysan Island. Museum Pictorial 12, Denver Museum of Natural History
- 1962 – Subantarctic Campbell Island. Proceedings 10, Denver Museum of Natural History. (With J. H. Sorensen).
- 1965 – Birds of Colorado. (2 vols). Denver Museum of Natural History. (With R. J. Niedrach).
- 1971 – Field Work of a Museum Naturalist: 1919–1922, Alaska-Southeast, Alaska-Far North. Museum Pictorial 22, Denver Museum of Natural History
