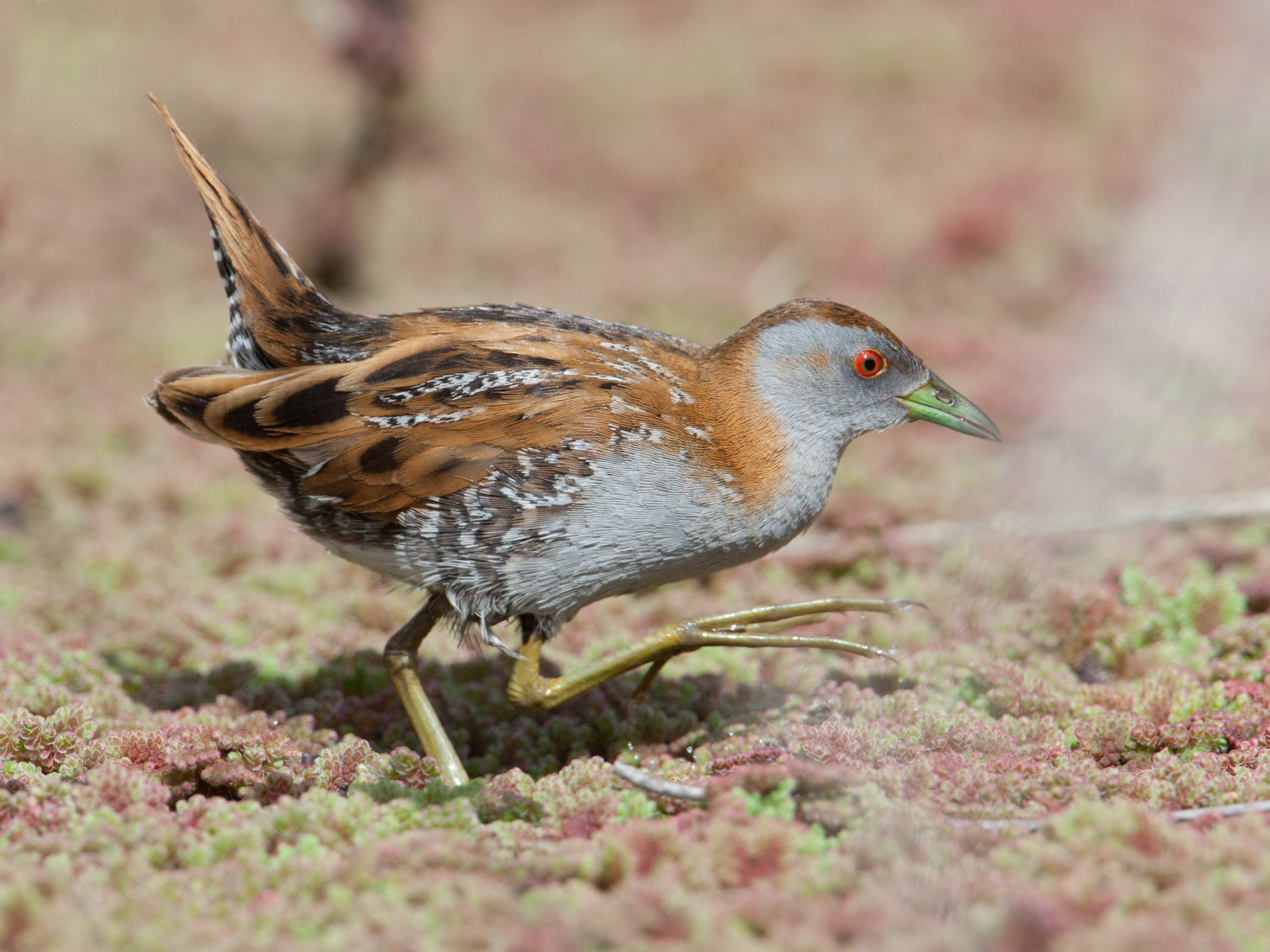
- Baillon's crake, Zapornia pusilla

Scientific classification
- Kingdom: Animalia
- Phylum: Chordata
- Class: Aves
- Order: Gruiformes
- Family: Rallidae
- Genus: Zapornia; Leach, 1816

Type species
- Gallinula minuta Montagu, 1813

Species
- 10 living, and see text

Synonyms
- Aphanolimnas Sharpe, 1892; Aphanolymnas (lapsus); Corethrura G.R.Gray, 1846 (non Hope, 1843: preoccupied) (but see below); Kittlitzia Hartlaub, 1891 (non Hartert, 1891: preoccupied); Limnobaenus Sundevall, 1873; Limnocorax Peters, 1854; Nesophylax Murphy, 1924; Palugalla Balatzki, 2011; Pennula Dole, 1878; Phalaridion Kaup, 1829; Porzanoidea Mathews, 1912; Porzanula Frohawk, 1892; Rallites Pucheran, 1845; Schoenocrex Roberts, 1922; Schoenoscrex (lapsus)

= Zapornia =

Genus of birds

Zapornia is a recently revalidated genus of birds in the rail family Rallidae; it was included in Porzana for much of the late 20th century. These smallish to tiny rails are found across most of the world, but are entirely absent from the Americas except as wind-blown stray birds (which are regularly encountered on the Atlantic coasts however). A number of species, and probably an even larger number of prehistorically extinct ones, are known only from small Pacific islands; several of these lost the ability to fly in the absence of terrestrial predators. They are somewhat less aquatic than Porzana proper, inhabiting the edges of wetlands, reedbelts, but also drier grass- and shrubland and in some cases open forest.

They are medium brown to blackish above, at least from the neck backwards but usually also on the top of the head, uniformly coloured or with some rather inconspicuous (unlike the boldly spotted Porzana proper) pattern of some blackish and/or whitish spots on the wings and back and/or a grey stripe above the eyes. The lower parts, from the bill to the legs, have grey plumage in most species - ranging from pale to almost black -, but are light ruddy-brown in a few. Between legs and tail, the plumage is brown to black, and in many species features more or less conspicuous whitish barring as in many other genera of rails (including Porzana proper). Some species (in particular small-island ones) appear uniformly drab brown or blackish-grey, with little discernible pattern when not seen up close. The eyes are usually red to chestnut-brown; the bill is short and straight by rail standards, greenish-yellow in most species, but bright yellow or blackish in a few. The legs have a greenish to reddish colouration even in the otherwise quite uniformly dusky species, and in some species are bright red

== Taxonomy and systematics ==
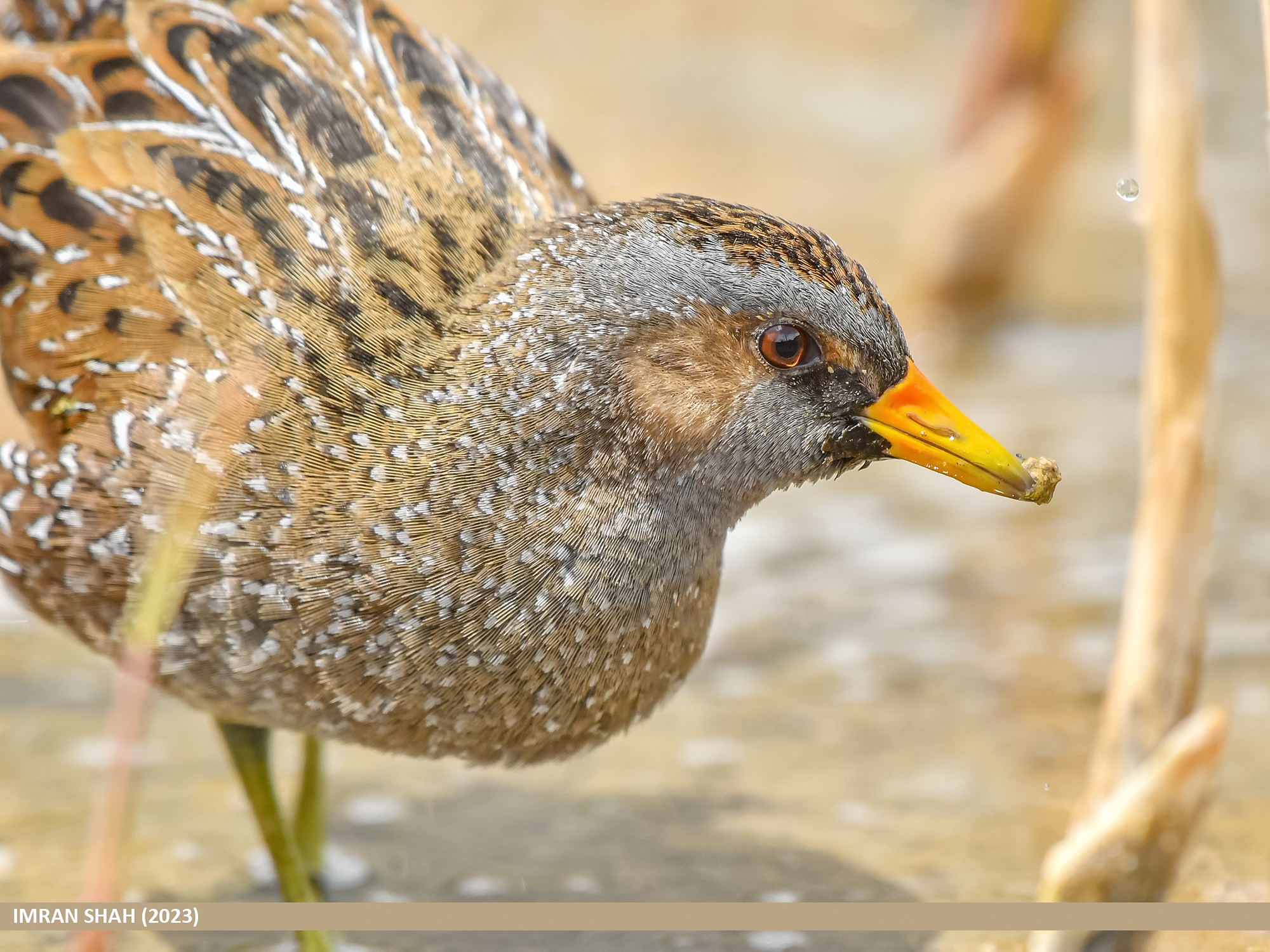
Zapornia crakes were traditionally included in the Spotted crake's genus Porzana, but within their subfamily they are not closely related at all

The genus Zapornia was introduced in 1816 by the English zoologist William Elford Leach in a catalogue of animals in the British Museum. He included a single species, the little crake, which is therefore the type species. The genus name is a near-anagram of the French ornithologist Louis-Pierre Vieillot's genus Porzana.

However, Leach's proposal was not widely adopted. During the 1840s Zapornia was used as a "wastebin taxon" for newly-discovered small rails from all over the world, few of which actually belong to today's Zapornia clade; in 1880, even the Slender-billed flufftail was placed here, which eventually turned out to be no rail (family Rallidae) at all, but rather an aberrant crake-like member of the flufftail family Sarothruridae. Subsequently, Leach's genus was generally synonymized with Porzana, assuming that species such as the Little and Baillon's crake were merely diminutive representatives of that genus. From the late 19th to the mid-20th century, any newly-discovered Zapornia crakes were either assigned to new and usually monotypic genera, or – increasingly often – lumped with their presumed relatives in Porzana. In his 1973 review of rail systematics, Storrs Olson noted that the mutual delimitation of the (loosely-circumscribed) Porzana and Amaurornis was "[o]ne of the most difficult problems in rail taxonomy" and found no way to resolve it to his satisfaction. He concluded that the two genera were polyphyletic with regard to each other, and recommended including the numerous small segregate genera of Pacific island crakes in Porphyria, and the African crakes sometimes separated as Limnocorax in Amaurornis, until a satisfying solution for the delimitation of the two larger genera could be proposed.

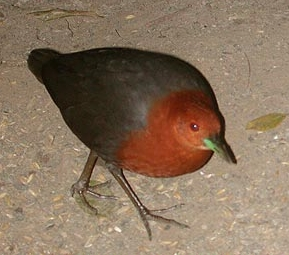
The Red-necked crake (Rallina tricolor) is among the closest living relatives of Zapornia

The first cladistic analyses, using morphological data, found it almost impossible to resolve any phylogenetic structure in Porzana and similar genera, but indicated that the entire group was closely related to Amaurornis bush-hen and the Laterallus crakes, as well as to coots (Fulica) and moorhen (Gallinula). Molecular phylogenetic studies starting in 2002 revealed that Porzana proper was a well-distinct lineage within the entire aforementioned group, to which the subfamily name Himanthornithinae was applied as it also included the singular Nkulengu rail of genus Himantornis, a highly aberrant tropical rainforest species that was long considered to be the most "primitive" living rail. However, molecular data places not only the Nkulengu rail within the subfamily containing Porzana and its allies, but also the huge swamphen (Porphyrio) which morphological analysis had resolved as another one of the most ancient extant lineages of rails (although Olson in 1973 had correctly allied them with the moorhen and Porphyrio). Unlike the other rail subfamily, Rallinae, which includes mostly mid-sized amphibious species, the Himanthornithinae unite both very large and very small rails, as well as decidedly aquatic and strongly terrestrial lineages; it is thus unsurprising that the morphological data could not resolve such an adaptive radiation to satisfaction.

As for the Zapornia crakes, they were found to be well distinct from Porzana, leading to the reinstatement of the old genus. In addition, some species traditionally placed in Amaurornis were found to actually belong in Zapornia, confirming Olson's 1973 suspicions. Surprisingly (except from a biogeographical perspective), the closest living relatives of Zapornia were found to be a group of South Asian crakes of genus Rallina, whose range is essentially surrounded by that of Zapornia. Rallina crakes are adapted to a more terrestrial habitat and thus differ more strongly from Zapornia in anatomy than might be expected given their close relationship; also, Rallina as traditionally circumscribed included a number of species which – similar to the Slender-billed flufftail initially being placed in Zapornia – actually belonged to the flufftail family and are nowadays separated as genus Rallicula. The morphology of Rallina is thus strongly convergent with the unrelated Rallicula flufftails, as well as strongly divergent from its actual closest relatives in Zapornia, causing studies which only utilize morphological data to fail recovering their true relationships.

== Species ==
The genus contains the following extant species:

Image	Common name	Scientific name	Distribution
	Black crake	Zapornia flavirostra Formerly in Amaurornis, Limnocorax or Porzana	Sub-Saharan Africa
	Ruddy-breasted crake	Zapornia fusca Formerly in Amaurornis or Porzana	South, East, and Southeast Asia
	Band-bellied crake	Zapornia paykullii Formerly in Amaurornis or Porzana	Breeds in northeastern Asia, winters in Southeast Asia
	Brown crake	Zapornia akool Formerly in Amaurornis or Porzana	South Asia
	Little crake	Zapornia parva Formerly in Porzana	Breeds from Central Europe to western Asia, winters in northern Africa and Southwest Asia
	Baillon's crake	Zapornia pusilla Formerly in Porzana	Resident in southern and eastern Africa, Madagascar, parts of Indonesia, Australia, and New Zealand; also breeds across temperate Eurasia and winters in South and Southeast Asia to southern Japan
	Black-tailed crake	Zapornia bicolor Formerly in Amaurornis or Porzana	Northern inland of Southeast Asia
	Sakalava rail	Zapornia olivieri Formerly in Amaurornis or Porzana	Western Madagascar
	Spotless crake	Zapornia tabuensis Formerly in Porzana	Philippines, New Guinea and Australia, across southern Pacific Ocean to Marquesas Islands and New Zealand
	Henderson crake	Zapornia atra Formerly in Nesophylax or Porzana	Henderson Island, southeastern Polynesia

Due to the uncertain relationships of the extinct species (see below), the internal phylogeny of Zapornia is not well resolved. Several clades can be distinguished with some certainty, however, and recognized as subgenera. Sometimes they are even elevated to full genus level, but given the conflicting data about the basal radiation of Zapornia, this remains conjectural for the time being. In particular the African endemics Black crake and Sakalava rail are the source of much uncertainty; they were considered closely related, even a superspecies, and allied with the Black-tailed crake when these three were still included in Amaurornis. This assumption was not based on quantitative analyses however, but on the similar appearance of Sakalava rail and Black-tailed crake and the fact that the Sakalava rail occurs on the western coast of Madagascar while the Black crake is found on the African mainland across the Mozambique Channel. Altogether however, the Sakalava rail remains little-known, and consequently has rarely been included in modern studies.

The Black crake, meanwhile, was usually found in molecular phylogenetic analyses to be sister to the remaining species of Zapornia as circumscribed here, but not always robustly so; one early analysis of a limited amount of mtDNA data, however, robustly allied it with the Brown crake. There have been few analyses including all of Black, Black-tailed and Brown crakes as well as the Sakalava rail, and the situation is further confounded by the discovery that due to a sequencing laboratory error the first published full mitochondrial genome of the Brown crake (GenBank KJ192198/NC_023982) was actually Common moorhen mtDNA, possibly with some contamination from the White-breasted waterhen, causing unfounded doubts about the Brown crake's inclusion in Zapornia. The Black crake would constitute subgenus Limnocorax, but whether this lineage is sister to the other living Zapornia (and thus the foremost candidate for splitting off the present genus) and/or includes the Brown crake requires further study.

The Ruddy-breasted and Band-bellied crakes, on the other hand, were never considered anything but sister species with almost parapatric distribution; this is supported by all molecular phylogenetic studies including those two species, but their placement with regard to the Black Rail lineage is uncertain; Ruddy-breasted and Band-bellied crakes may also represent an ancient lineage of Zapornia – perhaps even older than Limnocorax – and warrant recognition as subgenus (or even genus) Limnobaenus. Before the establishment of Limnobaenus, the Ruddy-breasted crake (under its junior synonym Rallus rubiginosus) had already been illustrated as type species of a genus Corethrura by George Robert Gray in 1846; this name, confusingly, was at the same time considered by Ludwig Reichenbach for the typical flufftails but formally established for these only some years later, leading to its invalidity and eventual replacement by the current name Sarothrura. Further adding to the confusion, in the 1855 edition of his species catalogue, Gray subsumed his Corethrura in Rallina, with the Red-legged crake (R. fasciata) as type species. However, even before Gray, Frederick William Hope had established Corethrura as a genus of lophopid planthoppers, and thus Gray's name was invalid too.

Likewise, a close relationship between the Little and Baillon's crakes has been suggested by most if not all authors from an early date onwards, and is well supported by the molecular data too. As this group contains the genus' type species, it would be subgenus Zapornia, but as it contains at least some if not most of the extinct members of the genus, its circumscription is not fully resolved. Much of this uncertainty derives from the fact that a comprehensive study including the entire core group of Zapornia, including the recently extinct species (to the extent they could be sampled for ancient DNA) has only been done once as of 2023, and the assessment relies on the limited molecular data available in 2002. While separating the Little crake in (sub)genus Palugalla has been proposed, almost all subsequent authors preferred to retain all the core-group species in Zapornia. However, the Henderson and Spotless crakes (and presumably some extinct species) stand apart from the Little and Baillon's crakes, and their clade might also include the Black-tailed crake and indeed the Sakalava rail, maybe even the Limnobaenus species. If this group includes the extinct Hawaiian rail, the subgenus name Pennula would apply if the Limnobaenus lineage is not included. The proposed monotypic genera Aphanolimnas and Nesophylax would probably be included here (and Aphanolimnas would be the name of this group if split from Zapornia and if Pennula is affiliated with Limnobaenus and excluded from it), while Porzanula, established for the now-extinct Laysan rail, is quite confidently a recent derivative of Baillon's crake's ancestors, and would warrant synonymization with Zapornia no matter how this is circumscribed.

The Brown crake has been variously assigned to the Limnocorax or Zapornia sensu lato clades; as mentioned above, the bulk of its published mtDNA data is erroneous. Intriguingly, one study combining morphological and DNA data found the Isabelline bush-hen – one of the species generally retained in Amaurornis today – to be closely allied to the Brown crake, and consequently also warranting inclusion in Zapornia. This is not supported by the limited datasets analyzing correctly-sequenced mtDNA however, and may be due to morphological convergence.

=== Recent extinctions ===
As mentioned above, a number of recently extinct Pacific island rails are also assigned to Zapornia nowadays:

Image	Common name	Scientific name	Distribution
	Laysan rail	Zapornia palmeri Formerly in Porzana or Porzanula	Laysan (and introduced to Midway), Northwestern Hawaiian Islands, northern Polynesia; extinct mid-late 1944
	Hawaiian rail	Zapornia sandwichensis Formerly in Pennula or Porzana	Big Island of Hawaii, northeastern Polynesia; extinct ~1890
	Kosrae crake	Zapornia monasa Formerly in Aphanolimnas or Porzana	Kosrae and possibly Ponapé, southern Micronesia; extinct mid-19th century
	Tahiti crake	Zapornia nigra Formerly in Nesophylax or Porzana	Tahiti, central Polynesia; extinct ~1800

The specimen used to describe the Tahiti crake has long been lost, quite likely even before it arrived at a museum, and thus the species' affiliations and even its very existence remain conjectural until new material evidence is found. One original painting by Georg Forster is presumed to document its former existence, but this has often been dismissed as depicting a Spotless or even Henderson crake. If the Tahiti crake was indeed a distinct species, the specimen shown in the painting was part of a collection which also included (as per Johann Reinhold Forster's notes) Spotless crakes from Tahiti and Tonga, causing subsequent authors who had no access to the specimens to treat them all as a single species.

The other three extinct species are known from numerous (Laysan rail) or very few (the other two) specimens. In the case of the Hawaiian rail, colour differences among these specimen caused them to be assigned to two species, but more likely they are simply juvenile and adult birds of a single species. What limited ancient DNA has been recovered from them allies the Laysan rail robustly with Baillon's and Little crakes (i.e. subgenus Zapornia even in the most narrow circumscription) and the other two with the Spotless and Henderson crakes – which, if correct, would cause the (sub)genus Pennula to refer to all of them if they are not included in Zapornia. Morphologically however, the Kosrae crake seems closer to the Black crake (though with considerable uncertainty) while the Hawaiian rail is so similar to the Limnobaenus lineage that it might arguably be included in that subgenus (which would cause Aphanolimnas to apply to the Spotless/Henderson/Kosrae crake group, if that is separated from Zapornia sensu stricto).

=== Prehistoric extinctions ===
In addition, a number of prehistorically extinct rails – most if not all flightless – known from subfossils found on oceanic islands have been placed into Porzana. Their former range is not anywhere close to the present-day range of Porzana proper (nor much closer to the known fossil record of the genus), but within or closely adjacent to the range of Zapornia as attested by living and historically known species. Consequently, it is more likely that most of them are actually Zapornia:

- "Porzana" astrictocarpus – St. Helena crake (but see below)
- "Porzana" keplerorum – Small Maui crake
- "Porzana" menehune – Liliput crake (but see below)
- "Porzana" ralphorum – Great Oʻahu crake (but see below)
- "Porzana" rua – Mangaia crake
- "Porzana" severnsi – Great Maui crake (but see below)
- "Porzana" ziegleri – Small Oʻahu crake (but see below)
- "Porzana" sp. – Aiwa Levu crake
- "Porzana" sp. – Easter Island crake
- "Porzana" sp. – Great Big Island crake
- "Porzana" sp. – Great Kauaʻi crake
- "Porzana" sp. – Huahine crake – probably subspecies of Z. tabuensis
- "Porzana" sp. – Lesser Mangaia crake – possibly subspecies of Z. tabuensis
- "Porzana" sp. – Malakula crake
- "Porzana" sp. – Marquesas crake (Nuku Hiva, Ua Huka; up to 2 species)
- "Porzana" sp. – Marianas crake (Aguijan, Guam, Rota, Tinian; up to 4 species)
- "Porzana" sp. – Medium Kauaʻi crake
- "Porzana" sp. – Medium Maui crake
- "Porzana" sp. – Medium O‘ahu crake – possibly same as "P." ralphorum or "P." ziegleri
- "Porzana" sp. – Small Big Island crake
- "Porzana" sp. – Ua Huka crake

The St. Helena crake has traditionally been considered an insular offshoot of ancestral Baillon's crakes – basically the Laysan rail's equivalent from almost exactly the other side of the world – and is officially placed in Zapornia by several authorities today. However, even though no molecular data are available for it as of 2023, it has been included in several analyses of morphological and combined morphological-molecular datasets, which strongly suggest it is closer Zapornia than to Porzana in the modern sense, but without actually being part of Zapornia. Instead, it is more likely part of an Atlantic island radiation of Laterallus (American crakes), which may also include the Inaccessible Island rail (formerly in Atlantisia) and the Ascension crake (at first included in Atlantisia but more recently separated as monotypic genus Mundia), and perhaps forms a clade within Laterallus with the Black rail, Dot-winged, and Galapagos crakes.

Of the Pacific island "Porzana" that have been cladistically studied in a combined morphological-molecular analysis, the Great and Small Maui crakes are not only most likely to belong into Zapornia, but actually seem to be close relatives or even sister species within the group that also includes the Laysan rail and Baillon's crake. Ancient DNA was also recovered successfully from both species, and gave a different picture: The Small Maui crake, while being part of the core Zapornia, seems more closely related to the Spotless crake than to Baillon's crake. The Great Maui crake, however, could not be placed confidently in the analysis. Neither the raw DNA sequence data, not details regarding analytic methods, nor any results have been published except a brief summary, so no further conclusions can be drawn for the time being. However, regarding the Great Maui crake, the analyses took place at a time when Porzana was still treated sensu lato, Zapornia was not yet revalidated, and Rallina was not yet revealed as sister group of Zapornia but believed to be so distantly related as to be irrelevant for phylogenetic analyses of "Porzana". Consequently, while the Small Maui crake is very likely a Zapornia under all but the most extreme "splitter" taxonomies, the Great Maui crake probably belongs to a different branch of Zapornia, or represents a distinct lineage of tribe Zapornini or even subfamily Himanthornithinae.

The extremely tiny Liliput crake from Molokaʻi directly to the west of Maui, by contrast, turns out close to Laterallus in the combined analysis, but without obvious affiliations to any particular group of species in that genus. It might be part of a radiation that includes Laterallus as well as Rufirallus and the Ocellated crake from South America, and given that Laterallus as traditionally circumscribed is probably paraphyletic it might thus even belong into an expanded Rufiralllus. Since a purely morphological cladistic analysis could not assign it (or any other prehistoric Hawaiian "Porzana", for that matter) to any particular lineage within Himanthornithinae, the Liliput crake's apparent similarity to tribe Laterallini might, on the other hand, simply be chance convergence.

The Great and Small Oʻahu crakes did not turn up anywhere near Zapornia (nor Porzana) in the morphological-molecular analysis, but robustly fell within the other rail subfamily Rallinae. Therein they resolved in tribe Rallini as well-distinct lineages within a radiation around Gallirallus. The smaller species fell within Hypotaenidia (which nowadays contains the bulk of the Pacific island rails formerly included in Gallirallus), while the larger one turned out more less closely related, in a badly-resolved radiation of mid-sized to large and very often flightless species comprising numerous small genera. Remarkably, the same phylogenetic situation also occurred on the Chatham Islands on the opposite end of the Pacific Ocean; there, however, the more ancient lineage (Chatham rail) evolved to diminutive size, while the Hypotaenidia species (Dieffenbach's rail) became more robust than its volant ancestors.

Both Great Big Island crake and Small Big Island crake are known from very few subfossil remains; they resemble the Hawaiian rail but are about 10% larger/smaller in linear dimensions of their bones, which is well outside the known range of Hawaiian rail size variation. Ancient DNA was successfully extracted from the remains, which suggested a close relationship with the Hawaiian rail, the Spotless crake, and the Small Maui crake; as with the Maui rails, no data or detailed information were published. Until more individuals of the extinct rails of the Big Island of Hawaiʻi are found, the exact relationships and even the distinctness of the two unnamed species remain elusive.
