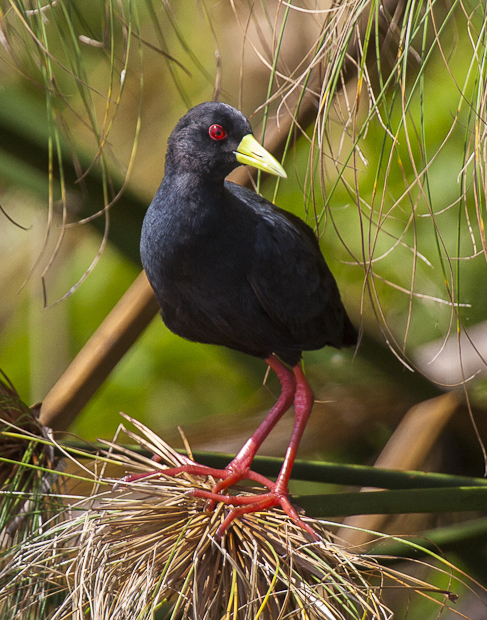

Conservation status
- Least Concern (IUCN 3.1)

Scientific classification
- Kingdom: Animalia
- Phylum: Chordata
- Class: Aves
- Order: Gruiformes
- Family: Rallidae
- Genus: Zapornia
- Species: Z. flavirostra

Binomial name
- Zapornia flavirostra (Swainson, 1837)

Synonyms
- Zapornia flavirostris Porzana flavirostra Porzana flavirostris Amaurornis flavirostra Amaurornis flavirostris Limnocorax flavirostra Limnocorax flavirostris

= Black crake =

Species of bird

The black crake (Zapornia flavirostra) is a waterbird in the rail and crake family, Rallidae. It breeds in most of sub-Saharan Africa except in very arid areas. It undertakes some seasonal movements in those parts of its range which are subject to drought. No subspecies have been described. It appears that the oldest available name for this species is actually Rallus niger J. F. Gmelin, 1788, but Swainson believed that the earlier name was unidentifiable, and his own has since become well embedded in the literature.

== Description ==
The adult black crake is 19–23 cm (7.5–9.1 in) long with a short tail and long toes. As its name implies, the adult has mainly black plumage, with a brown olive tone on the wings and upperparts which is rarely detectable in the field. The eye is red, the bill is yellow (hence the flavirostra of the binomial name), and the legs and feet are red, duller when not breeding.

The sexes are similar, but the male is slightly larger. Most males, but only 10% of females, have a hooked upper mandible. The immature bird has brown upperparts and a dark grey head and underparts. Its bill is greenish yellow, and its feet and legs are dull red. The downy chicks are black, as with all rails.

The main call of the black crake is a duet, starting with a throaty chattering krrrok-kraaaa. The response is a dove-like cooing coo-crr-COO.

== Behaviour ==
=== Habitat and status ===
The habitat of this common to abundant species is freshwater marshes of all types, as long as there is some vegetation to provide cover. Many rails are very secretive, but the black crake is often seen out in the open. It has benefited from human activity in the form of deforestation, and is rarely hunted because of its unpalatable flesh.

=== Breeding ===
The black crake is extremely aggressive when breeding and will attack birds of many species, but especially other rails. It will attack and kill rails of species as large as itself.

The nest is a deep, neat bowl made from wetland plants and built by both sexes in marsh vegetation or on the ground in a dry location. The nest is also sometimes constructed up to 3 m (9.8 ft) high in a bush.

The two to six, usually three, eggs are cream or white, and spotted with brown or chestnut. Both parents, sometimes assisted by the young from previous broods, incubate for 13–19 days to hatching. The precocial chicks leave the nest in 1–3 days, but are fed by parents and helpers for several weeks. They can fly by 5–6 weeks, and are independent at 6–12 weeks.

=== Feeding ===
The black crake is diurnal, and this confiding bird will feed close to humans and often in the open. It eats a wide range of invertebrates, small fish, frogs and seeds. It will take the eggs of birds and scavenge on carcasses. It will forage on the ground or climb reeds to find prey including flying insects.

This species will perch on hippopotamuses and warthogs and remove parasites.
