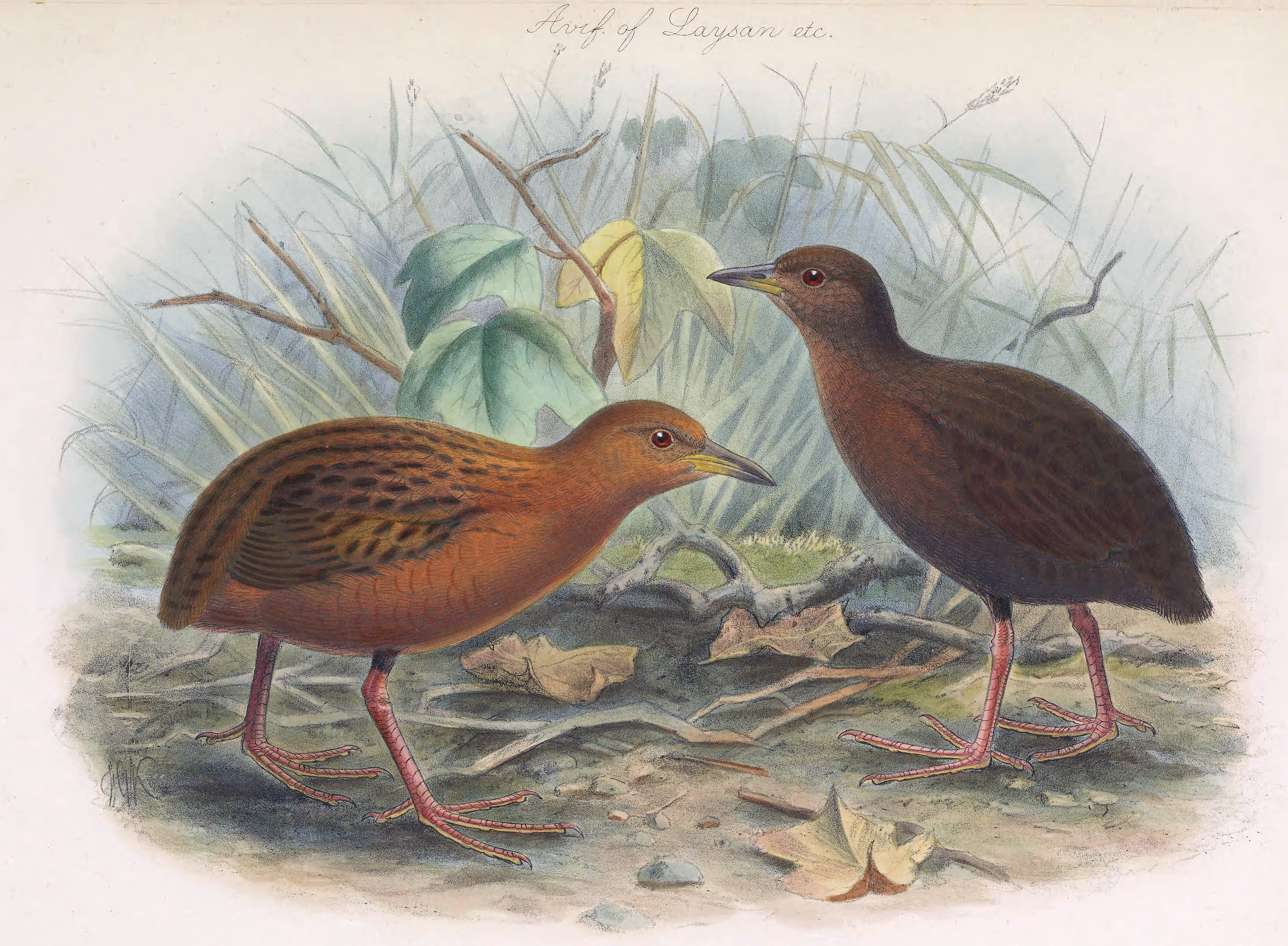
- Light and dark form

Conservation status
- Extinct (c.1884) (IUCN 3.1)

- Presumed Extinct (c.1884) (NatureServe)

Scientific classification
- Kingdom: Animalia
- Phylum: Chordata
- Class: Aves
- Order: Gruiformes
- Family: Rallidae
- Genus: Zapornia
- Species: †Z. sandwichensis

Binomial name
- †Zapornia sandwichensis (Gmelin, 1789)

Synonyms
- Rallus sandwichensis Gmelin, 1789; Rallus obscurus Gmelin, 1789; Pennula millei (lapsus) Dole, 1878; Pennula millsi; Pennula wilsoni Finsch, 1898; Pennula ecaudata King; Porzana sandwichensis

= Hawaiian rail =

Extinct species of bird

The Hawaiian rail (Zapornia sandwichensis), Hawaiian spotted rail, or Hawaiian crake is an extinct species of diminutive rail that lived on Big Island of Hawaiʻi. In Hawaiian, the common name for this species is moho, which it shares with the extinct Laysan Rail.

== Taxonomy ==
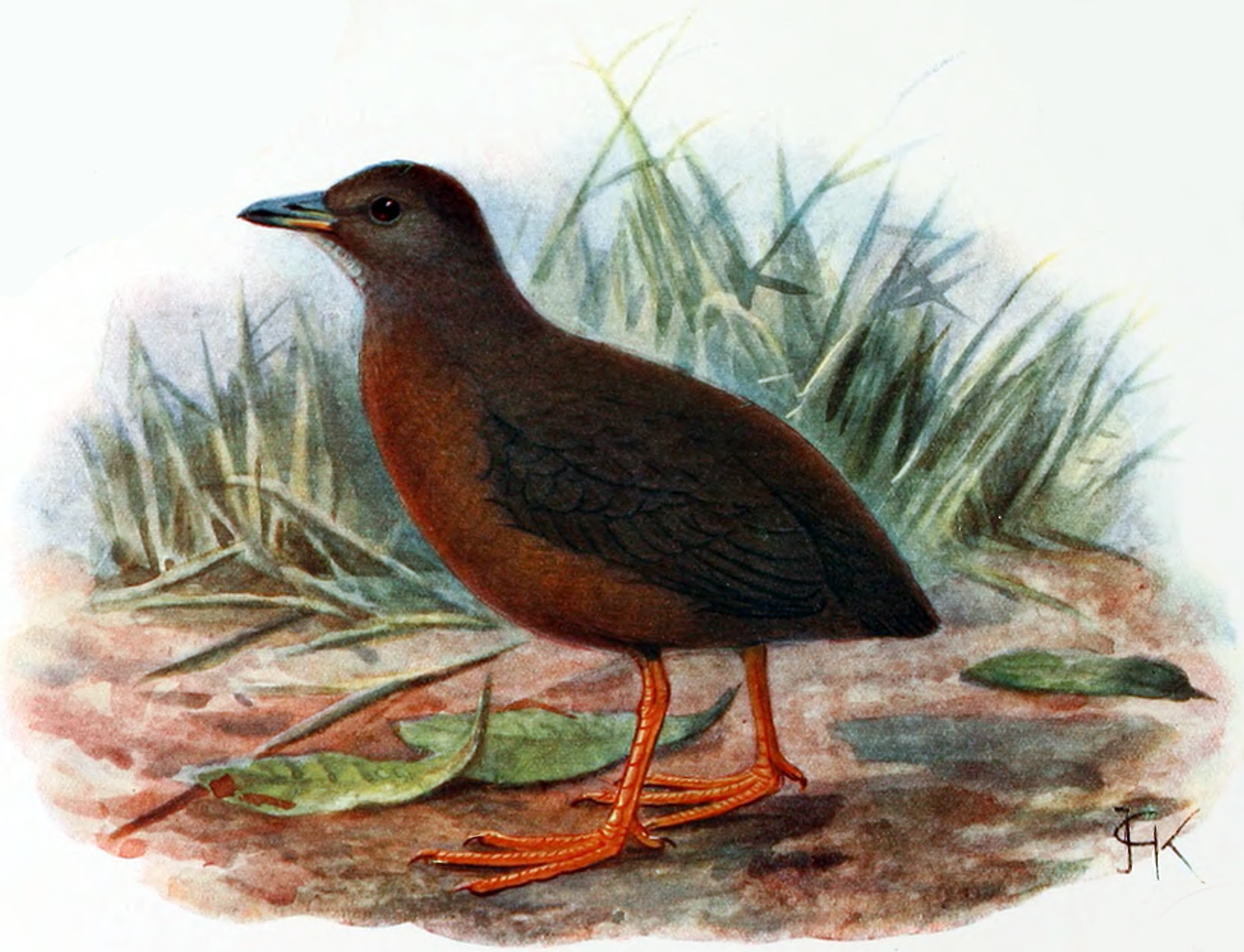
Dark individual

Considerable confusion has been created by the existence of two distinct forms. While it cannot be completely excluded that early specimens were collected on another island, only Oʻahu and Kauaʻi seem possible given the history of the specimens' collection, and only on the latter island is a similar-sized species now known to have once existed. However, the bones from Kauaʻi are in the upper size range of those found of sandwichensis, while the specimens of the lighter form are all of smaller birds.

This bird was only the size of a Laysan rail; it may have been the bird named iao or ʻiao, which would place its extinction at a relatively recent date. Also, there are some bones of a third species, approximately 15% larger than Z. sandwichensis, found near Kailua-Kona.

The generally accepted theory is that the lighter birds represent immatures, and certainly only such specimens have been described as young birds (the Hanover specimen is labeled as "juvenile"), but since the exact collection localities are not known with sufficient detail, only DNA analysis could resolve this question, particularly since the recovered bone material can also be expected to yield analyzable DNA fragments.

At any rate, both light and dark birds are today treated as a single species, with five of the junior synonyms referring to the dark form. However, Rallus obscurus is something of a mystery as it is generally assumed that at the time of Gmelin's writing, the species was only known from light birds (which were described as sandwichensis on the preceding page of Gmelin's work), but he seems to have seen a specimen of his obscurus at the Leverian Museum.

=== Etymology ===
The native name for the bird was moho, said to refer to a small "bird that crows in the grass". The name iao or ʻiao was claimed to refer to a moho-like but smaller bird; it is not clear whether this bird was the distinctive lighter form or the extinct unnamed small rail (see below). The bird is referenced in the old Hawaiian proverb ʻAʻohe mea nāna e hoʻopuhili, he moho no ka lā makani which means roughly "nothing can blow him off course, he is like a moho in the wind"; it was used to indicate admiration for an undaunted or determined person (as the bird was unable to fly, it was not affected by the wind). This is not to be confused with the taxonomical name Moho, which are the ʻōʻō; also from Hawaiʻi and extinct, but completely unrelated birds.

== Description ==
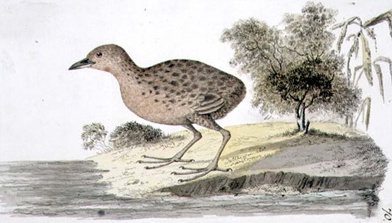
Specimen painted by William Ellis while accompanying Captain James Cook on his third voyage (1776–78)

The first collections were of individuals of the lighter form, of which today 5 specimens seem to exist: in the Naturalis in Leiden (one: RMNH 87450), in the American Museum of Natural History and New York City (1)). Of the dark form, several additional individuals are present in collections in Cambridge (Museum of Natural History, 1), London (Natural History Museum, 1), Vienna, New York City (1) and Honolulu (Bishop Museum, 2). One 1778 painting by William Ellis (plate 70) depicts a light bird, possibly the Leiden specimen (which was apparently collected in late January/early February, 1779), and in more recent times, subfossil bones have also been recovered.

== Habitat ==
Turnaround video of specimen RMNH 87450 at Naturalis Biodiversity Center

It was a flightless bird that was apparently found in shrubland and secondary growth on abandoned fields and in times of danger had the habit of hiding in Polynesian rat burrows. Specimens are known or assumed to be from an area which roughly corresponds to the middle elevations of today's Puna district around the present settlement of Mountain View, below the primary rainforest.

== Extinction ==
Specimens of the light form were collected in 1778 on the third Cook expedition; the dark form was supposedly not found at that time (but see above). Apparently, all or at least most specimens of the latter were procured over a short period around 1860 by James D. Mills, the last one in 1864. The last reliable sight record was in 1884, with a doubtful one in 1893; a dedicated search in 1887 failed to find the bird, but as it was rather cryptic, this cannot be taken as unequivocal proof that it was completely extinct by then.

As neither the small Indian mongoose nor mosquitoes (which transmit fowlpox and avian malaria, both exceptionally lethal to Hawaiian endemic birds) were present on Big Island until 1883 and the 1890s, respectively, this species' extinction was probably caused by introduced European & Polynesian rats, cats and possibly dogs. Hunting, sometimes is assumed to have played a major part, but probably was not significant, as the bird was protected by a kapu, which prohibited hunting except by aliʻi until 1819. After that, the few specimens that were collected suggest it was not extensively hunted even after the kapu were abolished.
