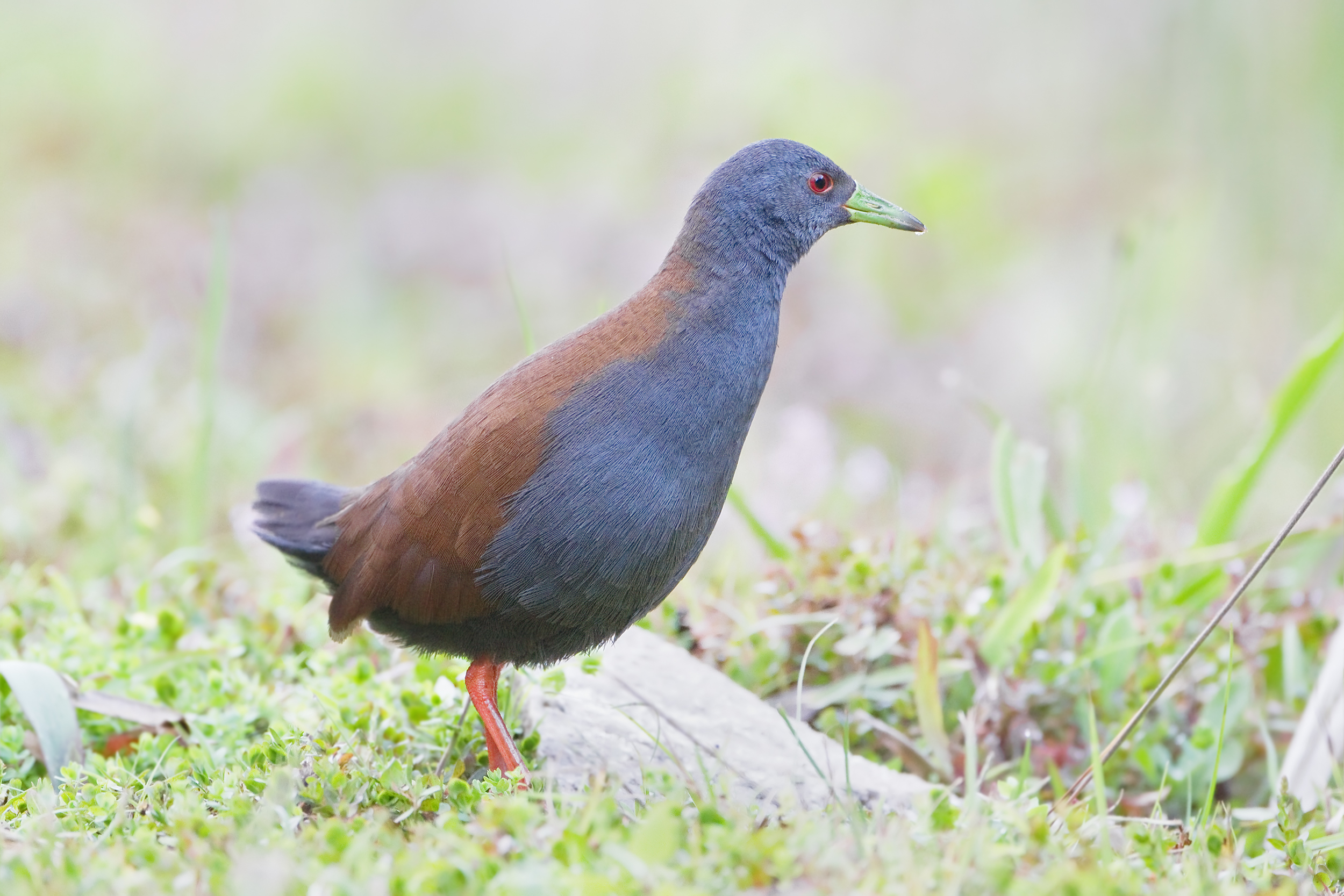

Conservation status
- Least Concern (IUCN 3.1)

Scientific classification
- Kingdom: Animalia
- Phylum: Chordata
- Class: Aves
- Order: Gruiformes
- Family: Rallidae
- Genus: Zapornia
- Species: Z. bicolor

Binomial name
- Zapornia bicolor (Walden, 1872)

Synonyms
- Amaurornis bicolor Porzana bicolor

= Black-tailed crake =

Species of bird

The black-tailed crake (Zapornia bicolor) is a species of bird in the family Rallidae. It is found in Bangladesh, Bhutan, China, India, Laos, Myanmar, Nepal, Thailand and Vietnam.

== Description ==
It is slate-gray with a chestnut brown back. Its eyes are red. Its slender legs are pinkish-red.

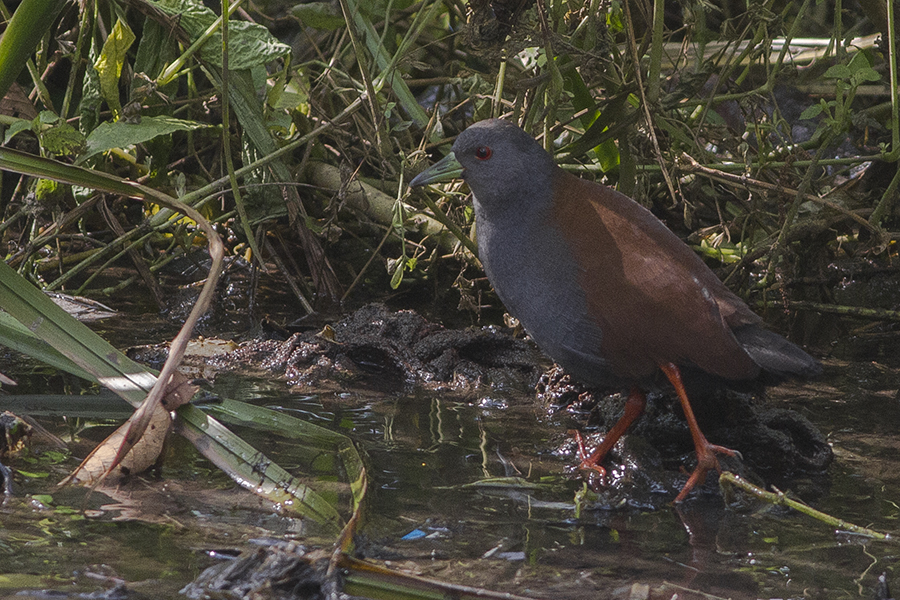
From Khangchendzonga Biosphere Reserve, West Sikkim, India.

Its natural habitat is subtropical or tropical moist montane forests.

== Diet ==
It is omnivorous, eating a wide range of foods including invertebrates, insects (particularly parasites off of large animals), fish, frogs, seeds of aquatic plants, bird eggs, worms, mollusks, grass, and berries.
