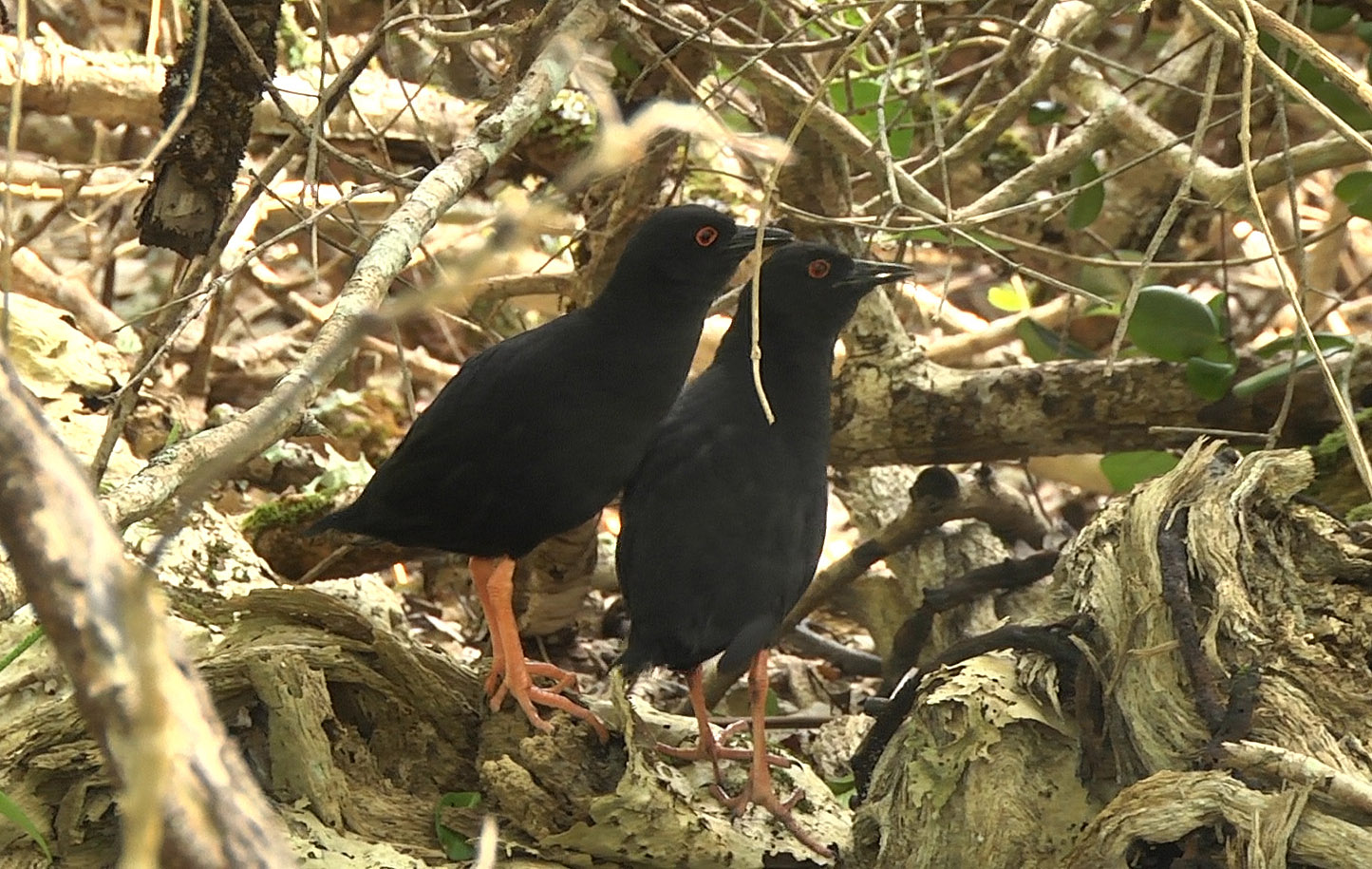

Conservation status
- Vulnerable (IUCN 3.1)

Scientific classification
- Kingdom: Animalia
- Phylum: Chordata
- Class: Aves
- Order: Gruiformes
- Family: Rallidae
- Genus: Zapornia
- Species: Z. atra

Binomial name
- Zapornia atra (North, 1908)

Synonyms
- Nesophylax ater Porzana atra

= Henderson crake =

Species of bird

The Henderson crake or red-eyed crake (Zapornia atra), also Henderson Island crake or Henderson Island rail, is a species of flightless bird in the family Rallidae. It is endemic to Henderson Island in the southeast Pacific Ocean. Its natural habitat is dense to open forest.

== Habitat and ecology ==
The species is found in dense to open forest throughout the island plateau, both in forest dominated by Pisonia and Pisonia/Xylosma, and in Timonius thicket, also occurring in Pandanus–Thespesia–Argusia embayment forests and coconut groves on the beaches. It is omnivorous and appears to be an opportunistic feeder, taking advantage of seasonal increases in prey. It forages in the leaf-litter, gleaning items—such as skink Emoia cyanura eggs—from the undersides of fallen leaves, large nematodes, beetles, moths, spiders, dead caterpillars, land snails and small insects. The breeding season is long, extending from late July to mid February (double broods are not uncommon) and clutch-size is 2–3. Helpers may provide extraparental care, such as defending eggs and chicks from crabs and rats. Based on a small sample, adult annual survival is at least 43%, and reproductive success is a minimum of 0.95 chicks surviving to one month old per pair, per annum.

The population of the species was severely affected by a failed rodent eradication campaign on Henderson in 2011, but had returned to pre-eradication levels by 2015. As of 2022, the population of this species is estimated to be 5,600 mature individuals (range: 3,800 – 8,400), roughly equivalent to 8,500 individuals in total.
