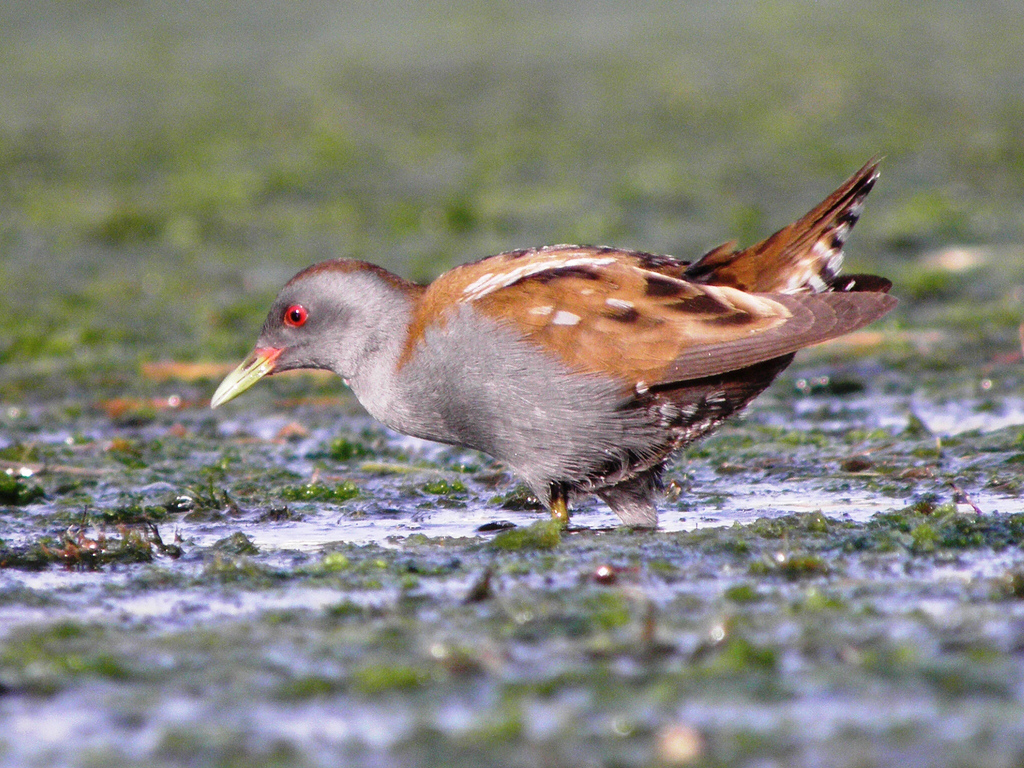

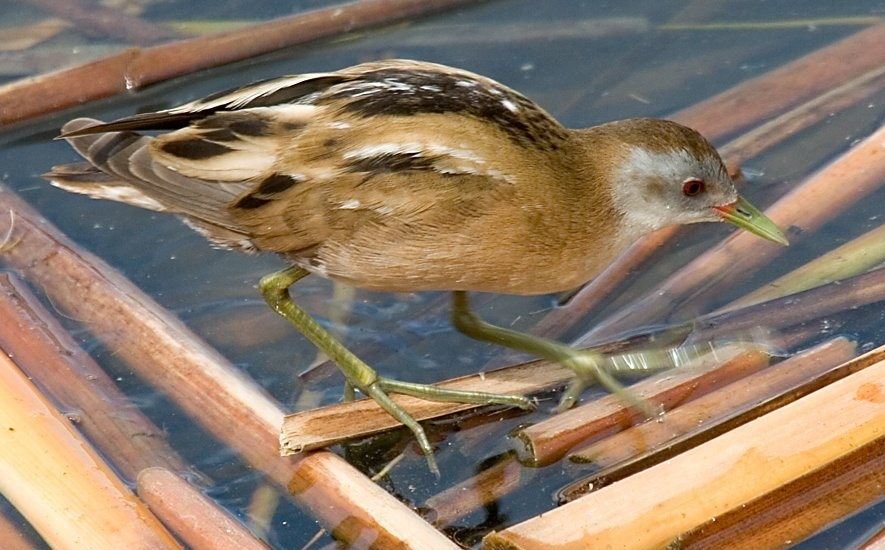
- Male above, female below

Conservation status
- Least Concern (IUCN 3.1)

Scientific classification
- Kingdom: Animalia
- Phylum: Chordata
- Class: Aves
- Order: Gruiformes
- Family: Rallidae
- Genus: Zapornia
- Species: Z. parva

Binomial name
- Zapornia parva (Scopoli, 1769)
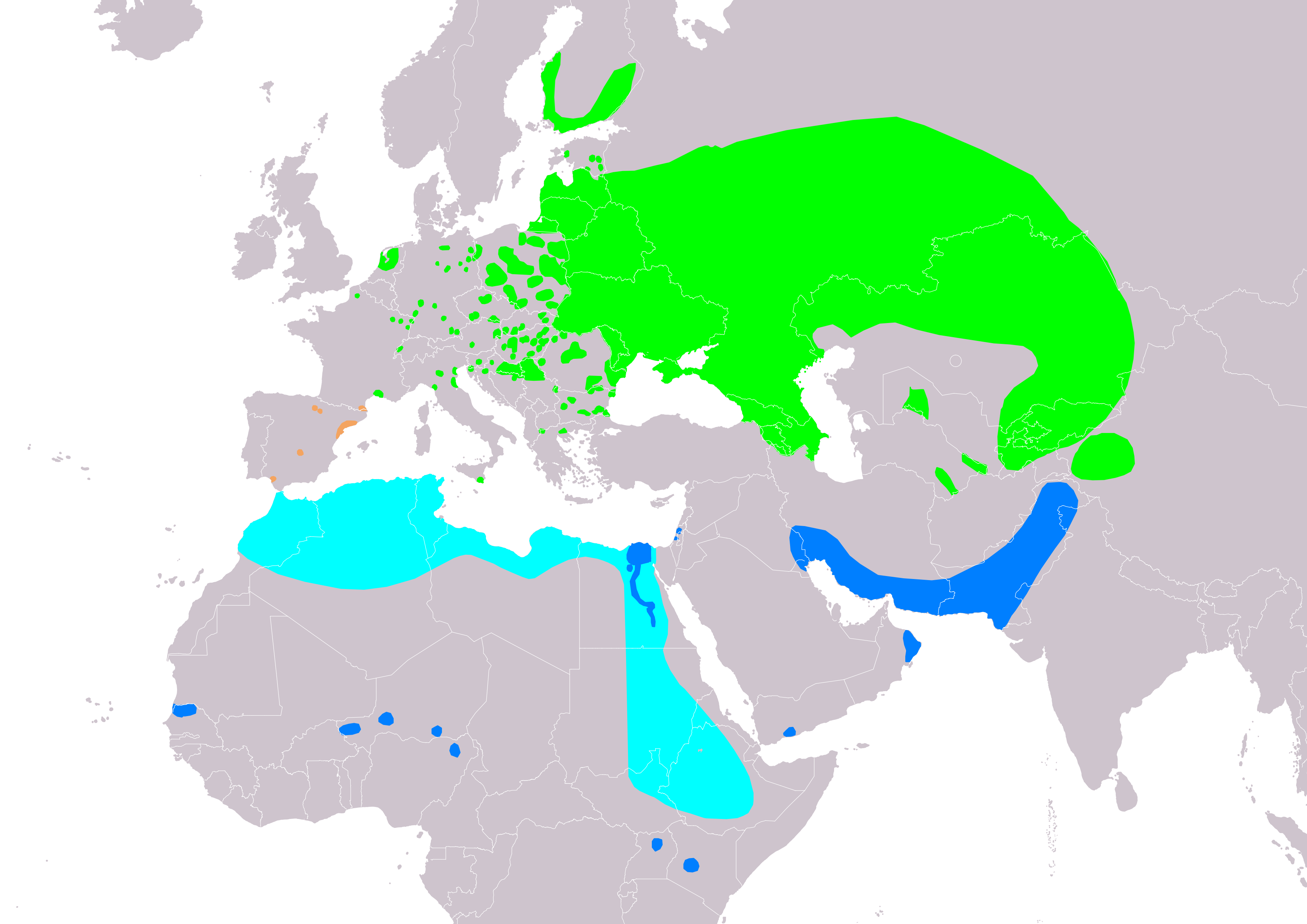
- Range of the little crake Breeding Passage Non-breeding Extant (seasonality uncertain)

Synonyms
- Gallinula minuta Montagu, 1813; Porzana parva (Scopoli, 1769); Rallus parvus Scopoli, 1769

= Little crake =

Species of bird

Porzana parva

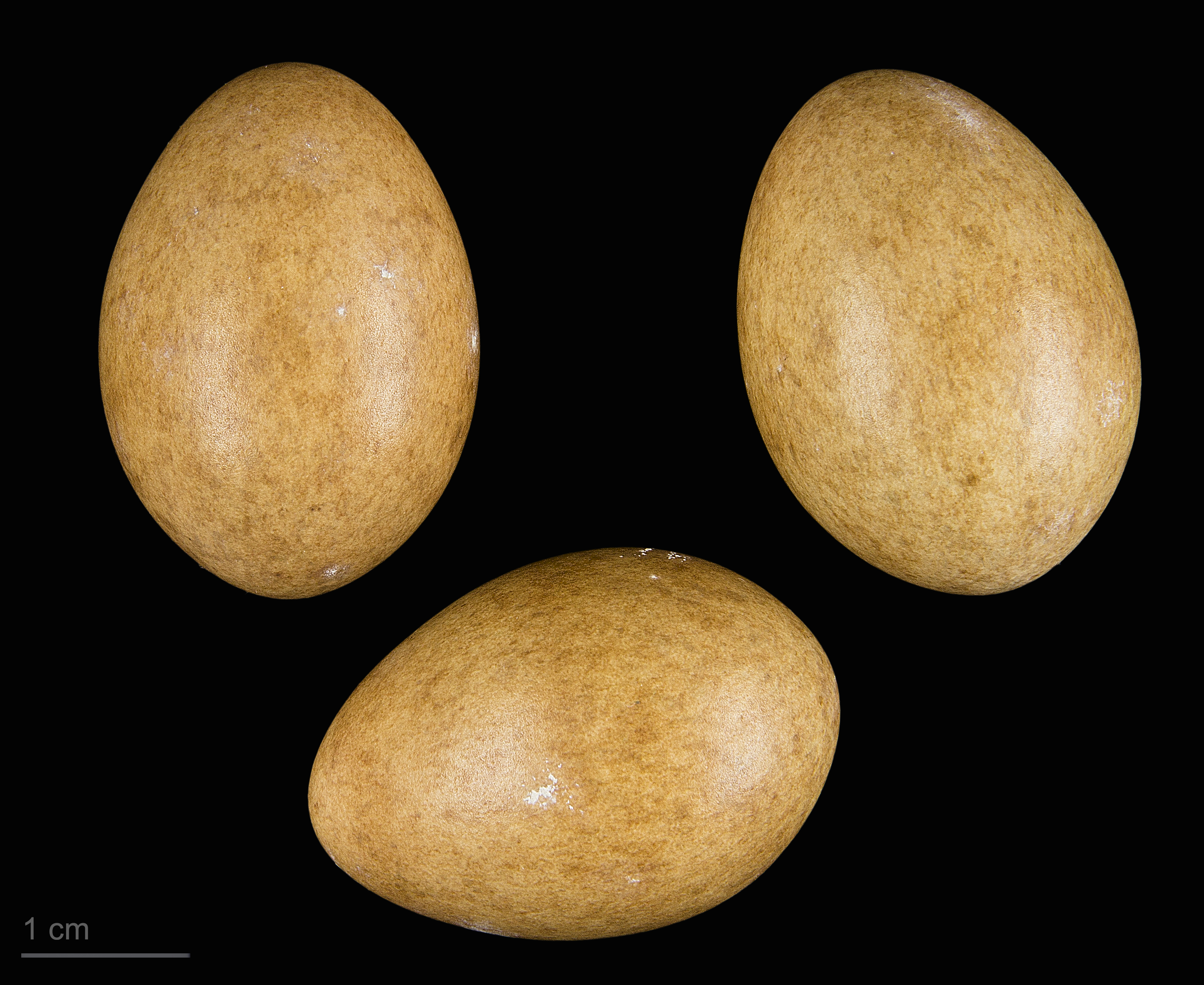
Eggs of little crake

The little crake (Zapornia parva) is a very small waterbird of the family Rallidae. parva is Latin for "small". This species was long included in the genus Porzana.

Its breeding habitat is reed beds in Europe, mainly in the east, and just into western Asia. This species is migratory, wintering in Africa.

At 17–19 cm (6.7–7.5 in) in length, they are slightly smaller than the spotted crake, from which they are readily distinguished by the lack of dark barring and white spots on the flanks. The little crake has a short straight bill, yellow with a red base. They have green legs with long toes, and a short tail which is barred black and white underneath. Unlike other Zapornia crakes, this species has strong sexual dimorphism: Adult males have mainly brown upperparts and blue-grey face and underparts. They resemble the sympatric Baillon's crake (Z. pusilla), which has strongly barred flanks and is a little smaller. Females have buff underparts, and are grey only on the face; they are more similar to the yellow-breasted crake (Z. flaviventer) of the American tropics. Immature little crakes are similar to the female but have a white face and breast. The downy chicks are black, as with all rails.

These birds probe with their bill in mud or shallow water, also picking up food by sight. They mainly eat insects and aquatic animals. Little crakes are very secretive in the breeding season, and are then mostly heard rather than seen. They can be easier to see on migration. They are then noisy birds, with a yapping kua call. They nest in a dry location in reed vegetation, laying 4–7 eggs.

The little crake is one of the species to which the Agreement on the Conservation of African-Eurasian Migratory Waterbirds (AEWA) applies.
