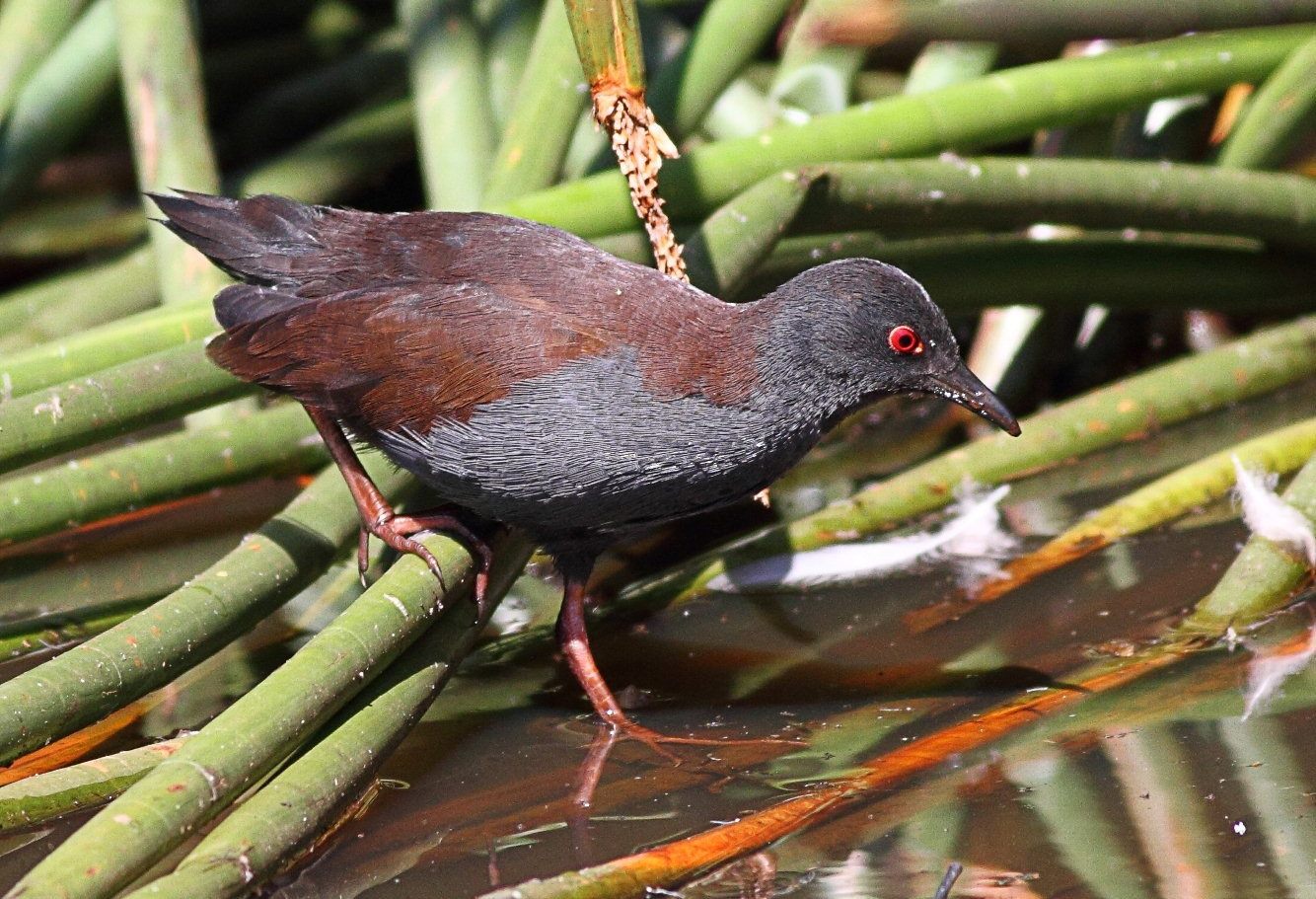

Conservation status
- Least Concern (IUCN 3.1)

Scientific classification
- Kingdom: Animalia
- Phylum: Chordata
- Class: Aves
- Order: Gruiformes
- Family: Rallidae
- Genus: Zapornia
- Species: Z. tabuensis

Binomial name
- Zapornia tabuensis (Gmelin, JF, 1789)

Synonyms
- Porzana tabuensis

= Spotless crake =

Species of bird

The spotless crake (Zapornia tabuensis) is a species of bird in the rail family, Rallidae. It is widely distributed species occurring from the Philippines, New Guinea, Australia, New Zealand across the southern Pacific Ocean to the Marquesas Islands to the south east along the Tuamotus island chain to Pitcairn Oeno island.

== Taxonomy ==
The spotless crake was formally described in 1789 by the German naturalist Johann Friedrich Gmelin in his revised and expanded edition of Carl Linnaeus's Systema Naturae. He placed it with the other crakes and rails in the genus Rallus and coined the binomial name Rallus tabuensis. Gmelin's account is taken from that of the "Tabuan rail" that had been described in 1785 by the English ornithologist John Latham in his book A General Synopsis of Birds. Latham's description was probably based on a plate painted by the German naturalist Georg Forster who had accompanied the British explorer James Cook on his second voyage to the Pacific Ocean. The genus name is an anagram of the genus Porzana that was introduced by the French ornithologist Louis-Pierre Vieillot. The specific epithet tabuensis is from Tongatapu, Tonga, the type locality. The spotless crake was formerly placed in the genus Porzana but is assigned to the genus Zapornia that was introduced in 1816 by William Elford Leach. The species is monotypic: no subspecies are recognised.

== Description ==
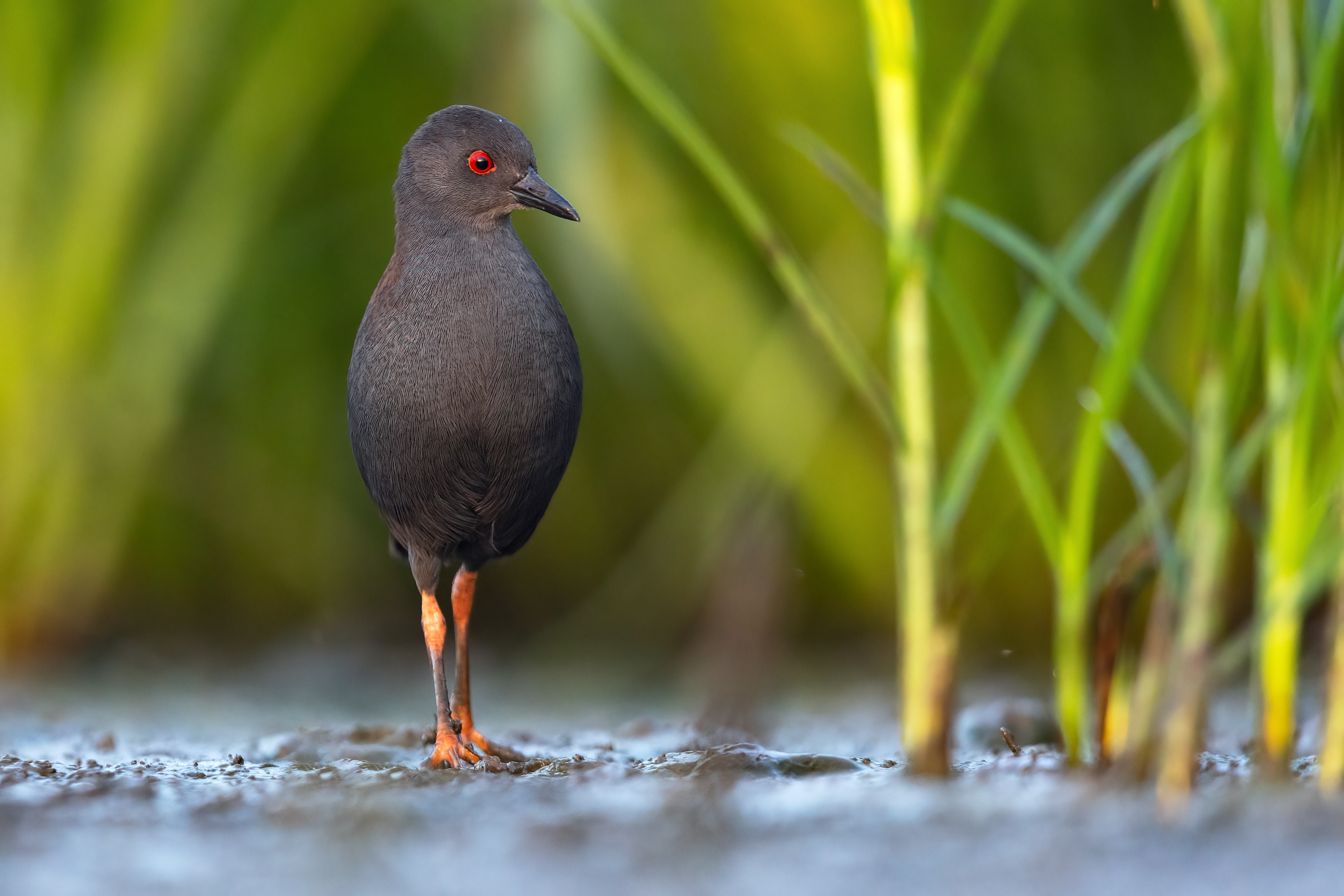
Pitt Town, Australia

As an adult the spotless crake can reach a length of 17 – 20 cm; a wingspan of 26 – 29 cm; and can weigh between 40 – 50g. The head, and neck of the spotless crake is a bluish–grey slate colour. Some also have an occasional light grey or whitish patch on the chin, which can extend down the throat. The back, the outer wings, and inner wings have a dark reddish–brown which then fades into a dark blackish – brown on the tail feathers. The underside of the spotless crake is also a bluish–grey which then transitions to a blackish–grey on the underside of the tail feathers. Its bill is black, and its eyes are a deep red which contrast sharply with the head. The legs and feet are a reddish–pink colour. Spotless crake lack any obvious sexual dimorphism, making it difficult to distinguish between male and female.

The juvenile is similar to the adult, but its colouring is duller over the whole body, and is paler and browner than the mature crake. Its chin and throat have a white patch on it. The back is a dull brown, and the head and underside is a dull grey–brown. The eyes are a brownish-orange which then begin to turn red as it matures. The colour of the legs and feet can vary from an olive–brown, brownish–grey, or a brownish–flesh colour which also turn red as it matures.

The spotless crake has a variety of calls, although little is known about the meaning of each. Originally, seven separate calls of the spotless crake were detected, including a bubbling sound, a sharp, high pitched 'pit-pit', a 'mook' sound which varies in loudness and pitch, and a loud 'purring' call. The high-pitched 'purr' sound is believed to be its song. This call is made up of a rapid series of notes which are roughly 25 per second, making it its loudest call. More calls were detected at the time but since then only four have been described.

== Distribution and habitat ==
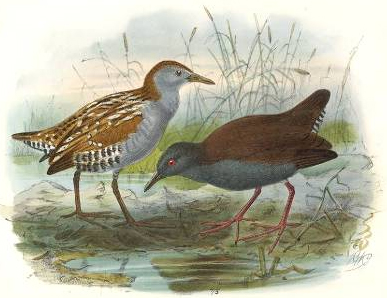
Spotless crake (right) with a Baillon's crake (left)

The spotless crake is widely distributed throughout the south pacific including the Philippines, Moluccas, New Guinea, Melanesia, Australia, Tasmania, Norfolk Island, and south-west Polynesia including New Zealand, as well as Indonesia.

In New Zealand, the spotless crake, also known as pūweto, is distributed throughout the mainland. Numbers are few in the South Island with only a handful of isolated communities on the west coast, east coast, and Southland, New Zealand. The distribution in the North Island is spread far wider, but there are still few communities. Most sightings of spotless crake tend to be near the top of the North Island. Nationally important sites include: Awarua-Waituna wetland complex in Southland, New Zealand, Great Barrier Island, Kermadec Islands, Lake Wairarapa, Poor Knights Islands, Tiritiri Matangi Island, and Whangamarino wetland in Waikato. Other than on the mainland the spotless crake has been found on many offshore islands including: 'Kermadec Islands, Manawatāwhi / Three Kings Islands, Poor Knights Island, and the Chatham Islands'. Fossils of the spotless crake from the Holocene period have also been found on the mainland, as well as the Chatham Islands. Because the spotless crake is rarely seen, it is hard to determine what the population size is, so currently population numbers are unknown in New Zealand.

It is believed that the reason spotless crake are rarely found in the South Island, New Zealand is due to the more dominant rail the marsh crake pushing the spotless crake out of suitable habitat, as the natural habitat of the two species are very similar. Another reason may be that spotless crakes are not as tolerant of the colder climates of the South Island, being mainly found in warmer coastal localities.

Spotless crakes are freshwater wetland birds. Their preferred habitat is wetland and swamp areas that contain dense vegetation in which to build their nests from. They can be found foraging on open muddy areas near dense vegetation, but when disturbed they retreat back into the vegetation. On some small offshore islands, where wetlands are sparse, they have been known to live and forage in dry forest. Although raupo tends to be the preferred habitat for spotless crake, they have also been found in swamp areas composed of flax (Phormium tenax), tussock sedge (Carex secta), and cabbage tree (Cordyline australis). If habitat is not ideal, they are also able to migrate locally, which other subspecies do elsewhere.

== Behaviour and ecology ==
=== Breeding ===
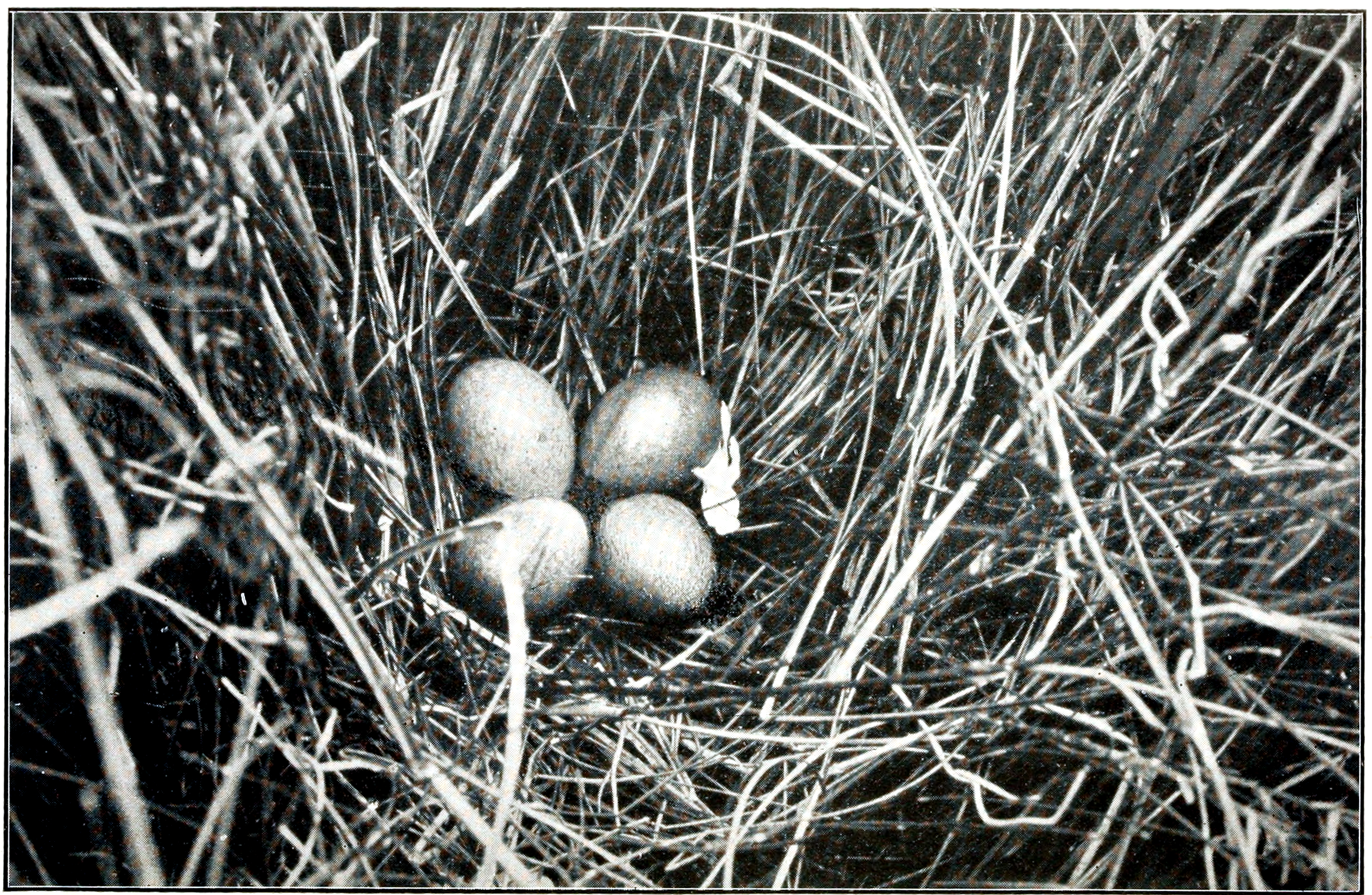
Eggs in a nest, Southwest Australia, 1913

Determining the sexual behaviour of spotless crake is difficult due to their shy nature and dense vegetation which restricts observations. Kaufmann observed the mating of spotless crakes at Pukepuke Lagoon where the male and female circled a patch of tussock sedge (C. secta) then stood on it. The female arched her body with the bill facing down. The male then mounted, while balancing with outstretched wings. Intromission only lasted a few seconds.

Nests are made up of interwoven grasses within patches of tussock sedge and raupo. They usually breed in large, dense, and tall stands of reeds, rushes, sedges, and grass tussocks. Their nests are found between 30 – 50 cm above the water, and are found to be in close proximity to other nest-like platforms. Eggs are laid from late August to the end of January, with a clutch size of between 2 and 5 eggs. The eggs are a 'dull creamy brown or pinkish with faint chestnut flecks'. Both the male and female incubate the eggs for between 20 – 22 days. It is believed there is evidence to suggest that clutch size increases as the season progresses; from 3 egg clutches in August and September to 5 egg clutches in December. Hadden found the same pattern in clutch size. After hatching, the chicks remain in the nest for up to four days, and have the ability to catch live prey from three days old. Chicks are then reared by both the male and female for 4 – 5 months.

=== Food and feeding ===
Spotless crake are omnivorous. Their diet consists of seeds, fruits, shoots of grasses, leaves of aquatic plants, adult and larval insects, mollusks, crustaceans, spiders, carrion, worms, beetles, and other insects.

== Threats ==
Due to the introduction of mammalian predators, the spotless crake is vulnerable to predation. Predators include cats, dogs, mustelids, and rats. The major predator threat appear to be cats. Parents may feign injury to distract predators if they are present. Other threats to spotless crake are the clearance of habitat, such as swamp draining and clearing for agriculture which mainly took place when Europeans arrived. Water pollution and degradation of wetlands due to grazing are also major threats.

SE Queensland, Australia
