= Great Oʻahu crake =

Great Oʻahu rail Temporal range: Holocene

Conservation status
- Extinct (11th century?)

Scientific classification
- Kingdom: Animalia
- Phylum: Chordata
- Class: Aves
- Order: Gruiformes
- Family: Rallidae
- Genus: Porzana
- Species: †P. ralphorum

Binomial name
- †Porzana ralphorum Olson & James, 1991
- Island of Oʻahu.

Extinct species of bird

The great Oʻahu rail or great Oʻahu crake ("Porzana" ralphorum) is an extinct bird species from Oʻahu, Hawaiʻi. The holotype (USNM collection number 426114) is a right tarsometatarsus found in a flooded sinkhole on the ʻEwa Plain near Barbers Point, the southwestern tip of Oʻahu.

It was known as the medium-large Oahu rail or medium flightless rail until its formal description, to distinguish it from the other flightless rail species which was endemic on Oʻahu until after the arrival of humans. Previously it was placed in the "wastebin genus" Porzana. Its scientific name honour C. John and Carol Pearson Ralph, who provided housing and other support for the scientists who found and described the species.

== Description and systematics ==
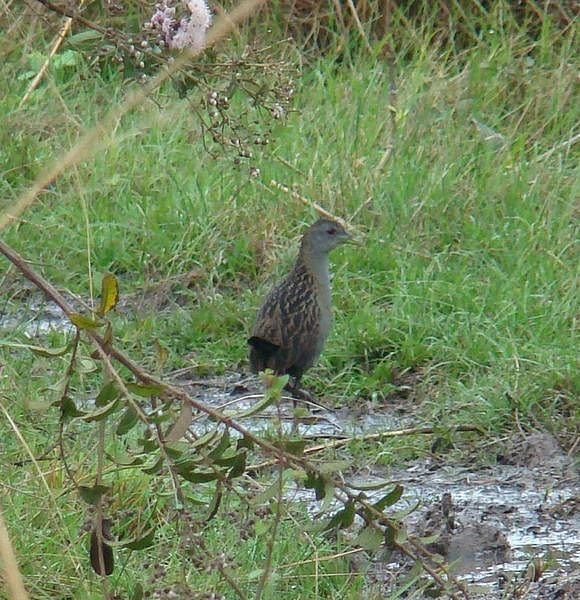
The great Oʻahu rail was similar to this Ash-throated crake in size and shape, but with shorter wings and possibly darker and/or duller plumage and a higher bill

The great Oʻahu rail was the larger of two species of rail found on the island of Oʻahu. Very little of its skeleton is known – a humerus, the upper and lower parts of the billtip, and a handful of legbones, none of which except the holotype tarsometatarsus is complete – no distal humerus and proximal tibiotarsus is documented as of 2023. Even so, since rail skeletons are notoriously similar in general proportions, and most rails have rather similar habitat and habits, even the few bones allow for considerable insight when "P." ralphorum is compared to other Rallidae: In life, it must have been roughly the size of an ash-throated crake or half again as large as the Hawaiian rail, about 20–25 cm (8–10 in) altogether, with a rather high and almost perfectly straight beak some 2 cm (slightly less than 1 inch) long, and weighing roughly 110 grams (almost 4 oz). It was flightless due to its small wings – the entire arm, from fingertips to shoulder joint, was only about 6 cm (some 2 in) long, with the single known humerus about 10% larger in all dimensions than in the Great Maui crake which was similarly sized and also flightless. The legs, on the other hand, were possibly slightly less well-developed as in the Maui species, with the holotype tarsometatarsus measuring 35.7 mm.

The species' plumage is unattested, but most likely it had a brownish-greyish cryptic coloration – possibly almost blackish overall, or distinctly paler and greyer from the face downwards –, perhaps with some blackish or whitish spotting on the upperside and maybe a grey stripe over the eye – and probably with some extent of lighter vertical barring on the belly and maybe all the way to the neck, as is common among its putative relatives.

At the time of its description, the great Oʻahu rail was placed in genus Porzana, which at that time was already suspected to be a polyphyletic assemblage of rails which consisted of at least 2 different lineages. Morphological cladistic analyses were conducted for the species, but the results are not consistent, and as of 2023 are not corroborated with DNA sequence data either. In 1998 it was analyzed in a combined group together with the other extinct Hawaiian rails in a morphology-based analysis. This analysis could only place it with certainty within a group which roughly corresponds to subfamily Himanthornithinae as it is circumscribed today; as later analyses revealed that the Hawaiian rails are almost certainly not a monophyletic group, it is unsurprising that the chimeric combined pseudo-"taxon" could not be placed more certainly. In the absence of meaningful quantitative data, authors generally held the great Oʻahu rail to be part of a radiation of "crakes", possibly even monophyletic, within the part of "Porzana" nowadays recognized as a well-distinct himanthornithine genus Zapornia, as these were the only rails known from that part of the world.

No ancient DNA was successfully recovered from "P." ralphorum as of 2023, but in 2021 it was included in a study which utilized DNA sequence data from living rails to create a well-supported framework aiding placement of prehistoric species for which no molecular data was available. Here, the species unexpectedly wound up far away from Porzana. Though with much uncertainly due to the limited material available, it resolved as sister species to the weka (Gallirallus australis), the type and perhaps only remaining living species of genus Gallirallus, a former "wastebin taxon" much like "Porzana", but from the other extant rail subfamily Rallinae, and containing somewhat larger and longer-billed species.

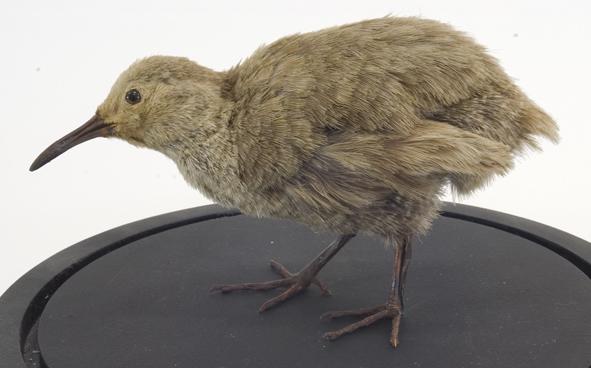
A specimen of the Chatham rail – possibly a close relative of "Porzana" ralphorum from the opposite end of Polynesia

Molecular data of the "Gallirallus" group suggests that the main Pacific radiation – essentially the ralline equivalent to the himantornithine Zapornia – indeed forms a distinct genus Hypotaenidia, as proposed times and again by numerous authors. The weka and Hypotaenidia are part of a badly resolved group of mainly Melanesian taxa including an extremely high amount of flightless island endemics, many of which (unlike those in Zapornia) still extant today. Possibly, "P." ralphorum was the most far-flung Pacific member of an evolutionary grade in tribe Rallini, containing mostly mid-sized to large strong- to long-billed rallines such as weka, Calayan rail, Chatham rail, Chestnut rail, Invisible rail, Hawkins's rail, New Caledonian rail, Snipe-rail and possibly the Fiji rail. Perhaps, even the Mascarenes rails – Rodrigues rail and the Red rail of Mauritius, both flightless and extinct – were part of this successive branching-off of species that became sedentary on islands from a volant population situated on the lands separating the southern Pacific and Indian Oceans, ultimately giving rise to Hypotaenidia which expanded across Polynesia to Wake Island and possibly beyond. Even if the Mascarene rails are not part of this group, the Chatham rail with its diminished size and highly autapomorphic morphological adaptations, which until the late 19th century was found on remote Chatham Islands in the Southeast Pacific near New Zealand, proves that this radiation could disperse some 5.000 km from its probable Sahul origin and evolve into a flightless island rail barely half again as large as the great Oʻahu rail, and just as short-legged.

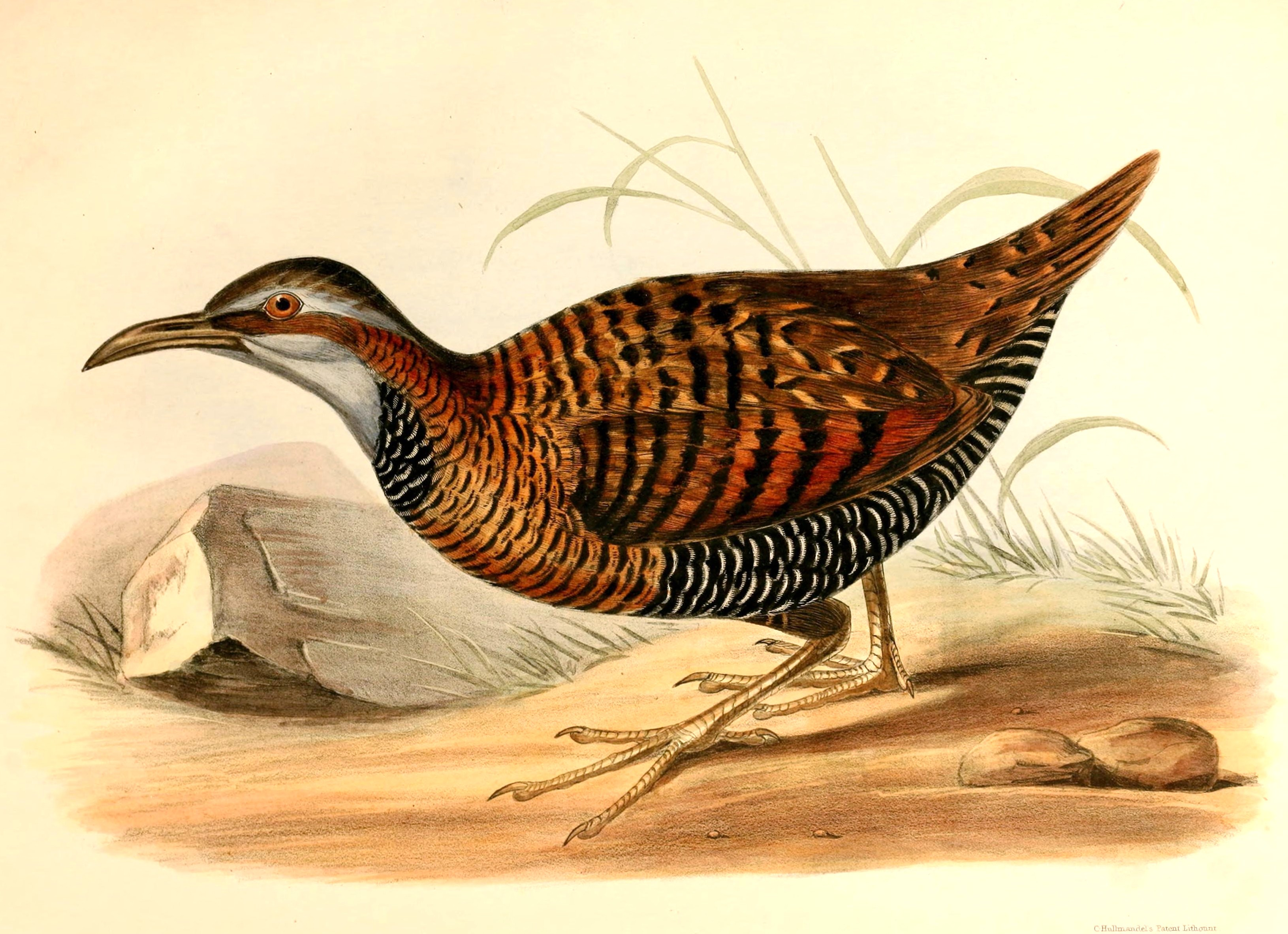
Dieffenbach's rail and the Chatham rail represent a case of competitive exclusion similar to the rails of Oʻahu

If the great Oʻahu rail is indeed part of the "Gallirallus" rather than the "Porzana" radiation, its apparent similarity to the Zapornia crakes is due to convergent evolution; conversely, should molecular and/or additional morphological data confirm it to belong to tribe Zapornini (or at least some other Himantornithidae) after all, it must be somehow convergent to the "Gallirallus" rallines. Some differences to the Great Maui crake were noted in the recovered bones, but their phylogenetic significance is unstudied. Only the species' humerus is presently usable for analyses related to the evolution of flightlessness; in "P." ralphorum, this bone diverged unusually strongly from that of volant Zapornia crakes – even though the wings of the great Oʻahu rail were less reduced in size than usual for flightless Zapornia – and in several details it was more similar to the humeri of the flightless "gallirallines" basal to Hypotaenidia. This has not been studied in a modern phylogenetic context accounting for the polyphyly of "Porzana" and "Gallirallus", however. At any rate, the great Oʻahu rail is highly unlikely to belong to genus Porzana as it is understood today. An interesting aspect of the proposed "galliralline" origin of "P." ralphorum is that in this scenario, its smaller relative with which it shared its habitat would also be a "galliralline" convergent with "Porzana" crakes, but representing a more recent arrival to Oʻahu, and most likely a true Hypotaenidia, hitherto unknown for the Hawaiian Islands and unexpected because the genus is unattested from the Line Islands eastwards. Such a double colonization by close relatives – a basal "galliralline" followed by a typical Hypotaenidia, both subsequently becoming flightless – was demonstrated for the Chatham Islands, where the more ancient lineage (the Chatham rail) evolved to smaller size, while the later arrival (Dieffenbach's rail) became more robust than its volant ancestors; on Oʻahu, it would have been the other way around.

== Ecology and extinction ==
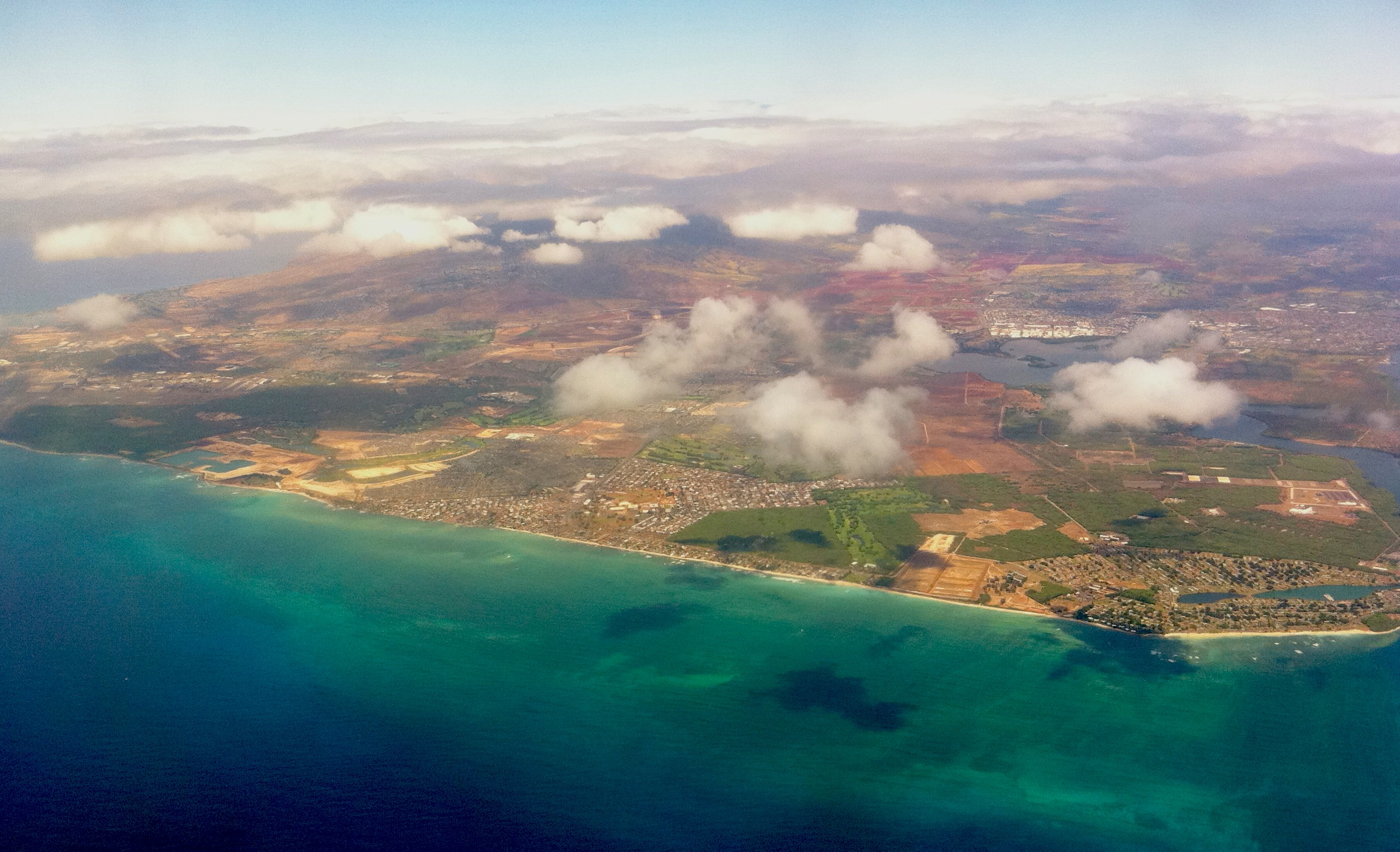
Aerial view of ʻEwa Plain, Barbers Point is just outside the central left border

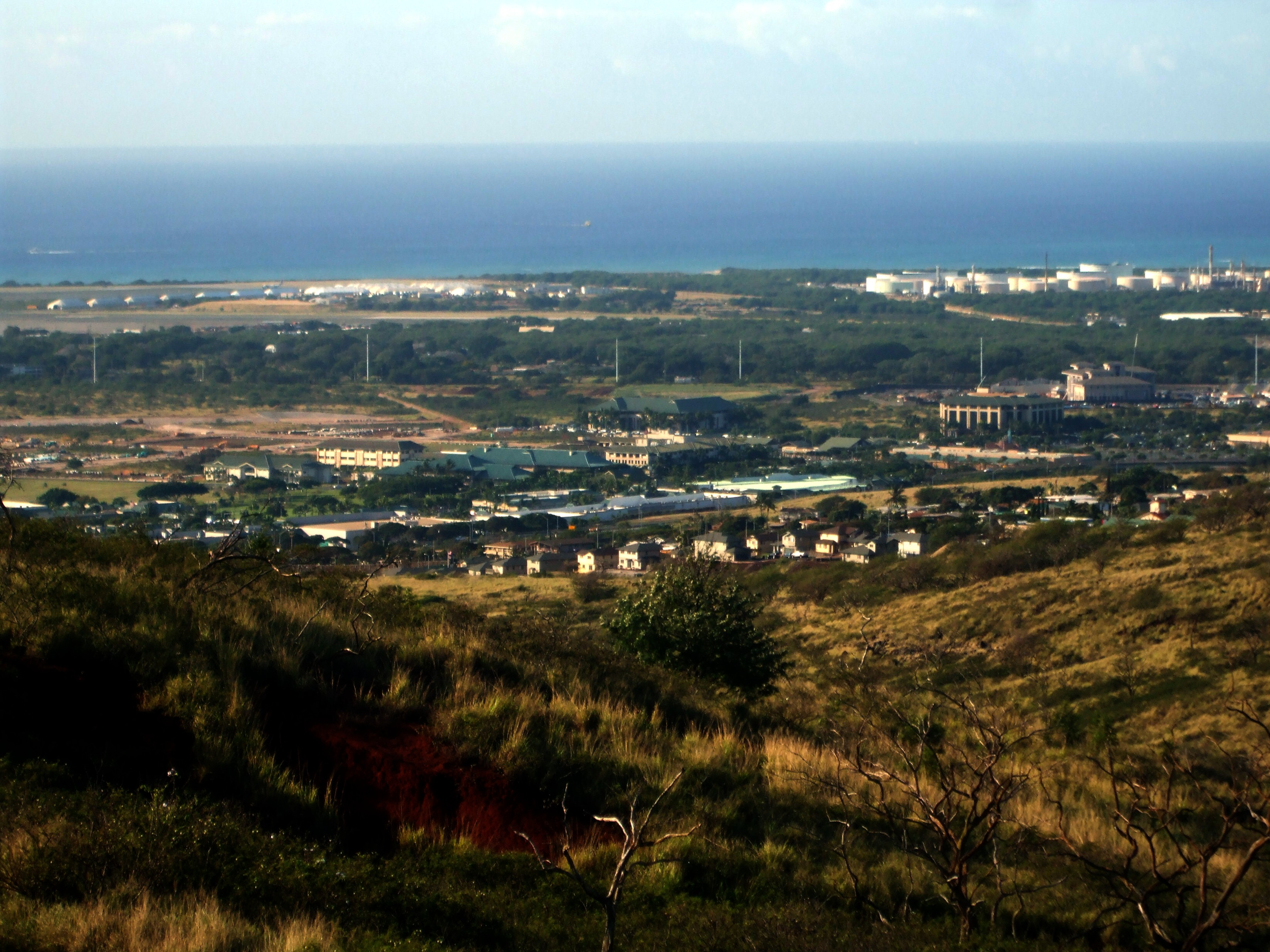
Seaward view overlooking western ʻEwa Plain – the forest here dates to modern times

The great Oʻahu rail's ecology is mostly conjectural, but not likely to have differed much from the still-extant, slightly smaller, and probably fairly closely related Henderson crake. It was almost certainly omnivorous, feeding mostly on invertebrates, seeds, and perhaps fruit, bird eggs, and carrion. The shape of the fossil premaxilla and mandible suggests that its bill was moderately wide, fairly high, and essentially uncurved. Notably, the premaxillary symphysis was shorter than in the Great Maui crake, and the mandibular symphysis was extremely short by rail standards in general – compared to the similar-sized Great Maui crake which presumably ate similar-sized food, the Oʻahu species had a larger, wider, but less robustly built bill, with unusually tenuous symphyses that made the billtips and mandibular rami more flexible, and consequently better suited for picking up, handling and swallowing soft and fairly large items than for pecking and probing. Given its habitat (see below), the great Oʻahu rail's diet thus probably included a comparatively high amount of tree fruit, and/or soft-bodied forest invertebrates such as moths.

While mammalian predators were absent on Oʻahu before humans arrived, several native birds are likely to have preyed on "P." ralphorum. The pueo owl still inhabits the island today, while Great and Lesser frigatebirds roam the offshore waters and occasionally venture overland to forage for small land animals; all these species would have posed a threat to an unwary great Oʻahu rail. More dangerous would have been the large Buteo hawk related to the Hawaiian hawk and – especially during nesting – the High-billed and Robust crows, all three are also extinct today. While Robust crows – slightly larger than the ʻalalā which today only survives in captivity – seem to have had just a small population on Oʻahu or might even have been mere occasional visitors, the High-billed crow's remains are numerous in the ʻEwa Plain sinkholes, and this huge species with its massive and robust bill would have easily subdued any great Oʻahu rail it managed to catch – that is, if its diet, which is unknown, was indeed as varied as in its living relatives, and not, for example, restricted to palm-nuts and other hard-shelled fruit. The Buteo hawk, meanwhile, is abundantly attested from the Ulupaʻu Crater deposits, but only from Pleistocene layers over 120,000 years old; it is entirely absent from the younger deposits at ʻEwa Plain, for reasons unknown. In addition, Oʻahu probably held a resident population of the mime harrier, which resembled a sparrowhawk in wing anatomy and likely hunted small birds in the shrubbery; while it was specialized for feeding on songbirds like Hawaiian honeycreepers, it was perfectly capable of preying at least on juvenile great Maui rails too. Finally, the Oʻahu stilt-owl, which could hunt equally well on the wing and on foot, was a small member of its genus Grallistrix, perhaps a bit larger than a Desert owl. Technically, it could tackle a half-grown great Oʻahu crake, or an adult it surprised while asleep – but it may not have found it easy to subdue a full-grown and alert adult "P." ralphorum: similar-sized owls generally eat prey weighing around 50 g (about 2 oz), and do not usually attack animals the presumed weight of an adult great Oʻahu crake.

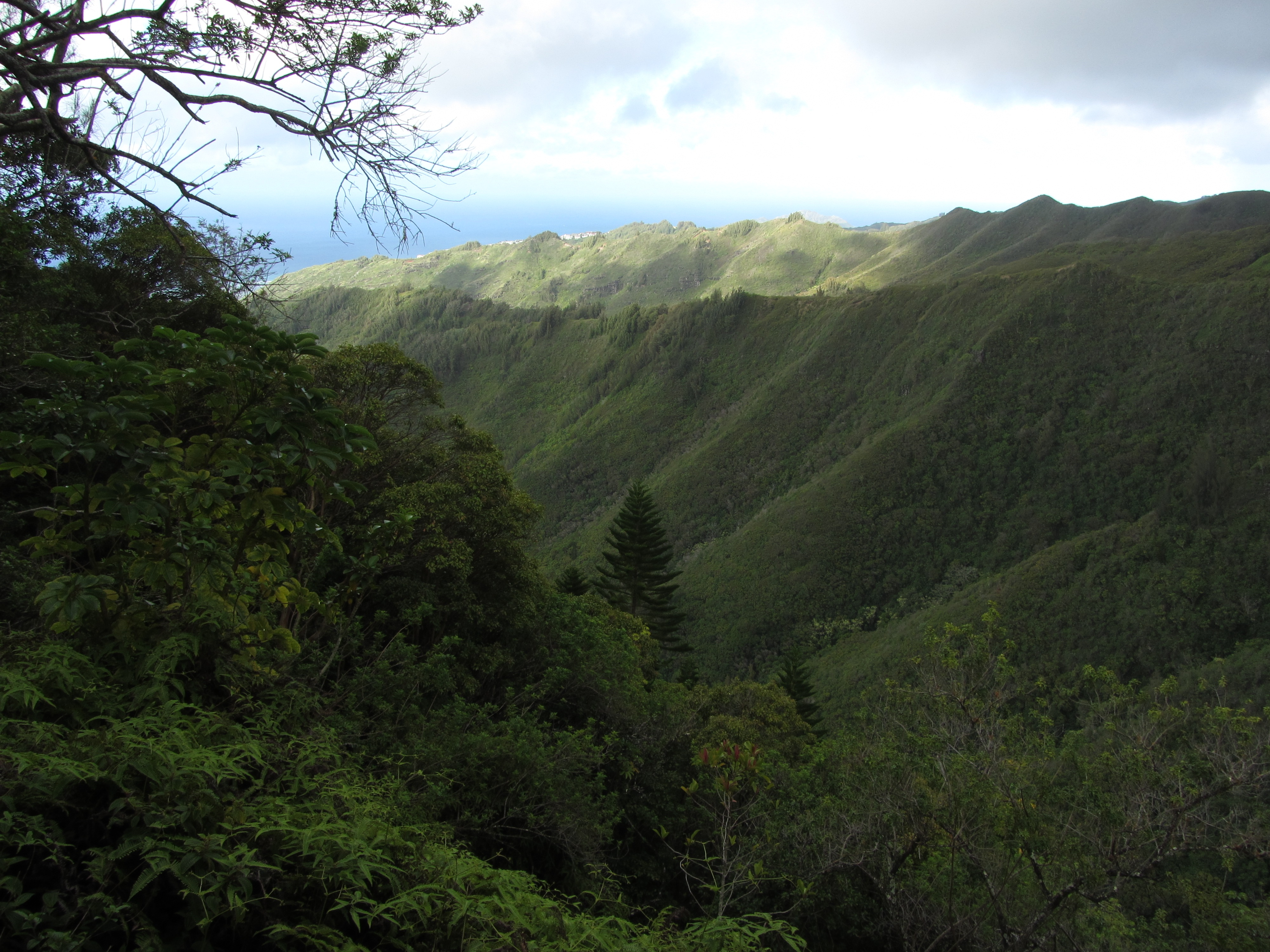
Honolulu Volcanics range between Kuliʻouʻou and Mōkapu Peninsula – note closed-canopy forest

Other than from several of the sinkholes at Barbers Point, great Oʻahu rail specimens are known from the ancient Polynesian Niu shelter – possibly from an individual eaten by humans – at Kuliʻouʻou in East Honolulu on the central southern coast of Oʻahu, as well as Ulupaʻu Crater which forms a promontory of the Mōkapu Peninsula north of the island's southeastern tip; some of the remains date from the period after humans arrived on Oʻahu. No studies of prehistoric bird remains from northern Oʻahu or its uplands have been published as of 2023; while it is nearly certain that the species once ranged all over Oʻahu's lowlands – Barbers Point being well distant from the other two sites, which in turn are connected only by a narrow strip of ground running around the Honolulu Volcanics mountain range – the extent to which it also utilized the densely forested upland habitat is, as of 2023, not known at all.

Studies of pollen deposited in ʻEwa Plain sediments before human settlement attested to a woodland ecosystem dominated by ʻaʻaliʻi hopbush, the singular legume Kanaloa kahoolawensis or a close and nowadays extinct relative, and loulu palms, with abundant Amaranthaceae (probably mostly ʻāheahea goosefoot) in the undergrowth suggesting a considerable amount of gaps in the canopy. Around 1000 CE, this abruptly changes; the woody species all but disappear from the pollen record, while ʻāheahea and Poaceae grasses become markedly more plentiful, indicating a habitat change towards grassland. Around the same time, the previously rarely deposited Polynesian rat bones start turning up in larger numbers in the ʻEwa Plain sinkholes. Human settlement on the ʻEwa Plain, meanwhile, was marginal until the deforestation was completed, indicating the loss of trees was caused by the rats eating their seeds, fruit, buds and bark rather than by logging. Native landbirds disappear coincident with the forest; the lack of cover would have exposed the rails to their predators, and predation by the rats is not unlikely to have made a major impact on many species, especially flightless ones such as the Oʻahu rails. Hunting by humans probably did take place occasionally, but given the low population density of the great Oʻahu rail even before humans arrived (as evidenced by the rarity of its remains), and the abrupt collapse of the species' core habitat (which probably happened not just on ʻEwa Plain, but across the entire lowlands of Oʻahu) preceding the expansion of human settlement across the island, the rail probably became extinct even before human hunters had an opportunity to significantly deplete its population.
