= Great Maui crake =

Conservation status
- Extinct (early-mid 2nd millennium) (IUCN 3.1)

Scientific classification
- Kingdom: Animalia
- Phylum: Chordata
- Class: Aves
- Order: Gruiformes
- Family: Rallidae
- Genus: Porzana
- Species: †P. severnsi

Binomial name
- †Porzana severnsi Olson & Helen F. James, 1991
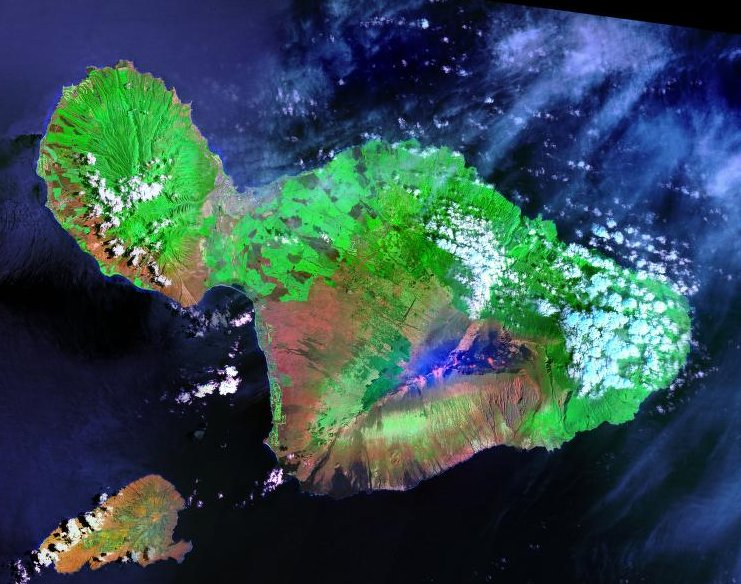
- Island of Maui (Landsat pseudocolor image); Great Maui crakes inhabited at least the southern third of the bigger eastern part of the island

Extinct species of bird

The great Maui crake or great Maui rail ("Porzana" severnsi) is an extinct bird species from Maui, Hawaiian Islands, known only from subfossil bones. The holotype (USNM collection numbers 378344 to 378363) are the bones of one almost-complete skeleton, found in Auwahi Cave on the lower southern slope of Haleakalā at 1,145 m AMSL. Its first remains, however, were recovered in 1972 and/or 1974 from lower Waihoi Valley further east and less than half as far uphill.

It was known as the larger Maui rail until its formal description, to distinguish it from the small Maui crake, the other flightless rail species which lived on Maui until after the arrival of humans. Traditionally placed in the "wastebin genus" Porzana, it almost certainly does not belong there, but while its placement in subfamily Himantornithinae is generally agreed upon, its precise affiliations are disputed. Its scientific name refers R. Michael Severns, in honour of his pioneering discoveries of lava caves with remains of extinct animals on Maui.

== Description and systematics ==
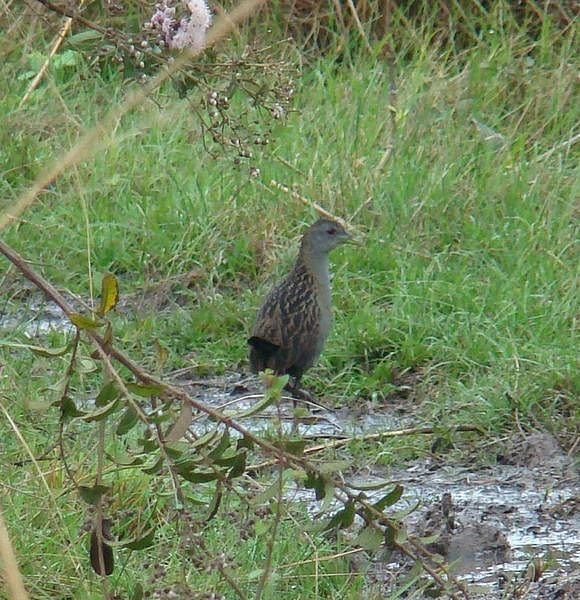
The great Maui crake was similar to this ash-throated crake in size and shape, but with much shorter wings and possibly darker and/or duller plumage

The great Maui crake was the larger of two species of rail found on the island of Maui. It was roughly the size of an ash-throated crake or half again as large as the Hawaiian rail, about 20-25 cm (8-10 in) altogether, with a fairly thin and almost straight beak some 2 cm (slightly less than 1 inch) long, and weighing roughly 100 grams (3.5 oz). The species' plumage is unattested, but most likely it had a brownish-greyish cryptic coloration – possibly almost blackish, or with some dark or pale spotting on the upperside – and perhaps with white-and-black vertical barring on the body between legs and tail like its probable relatives.

It was flightless due to its small wings – the entire arm, from fingertips to shoulder joint, was only about 5.5 cm (some 2 in) long, and the humerus was about 10% smaller in all dimensions than in the Great Oʻahu rail which was similarly-sized and also flightless. The legs, on the other hand, were at least as well-developed as in the Oʻahu species, with the tarsometatarsus measuring 36 mm on average. Compared to the related flightless rails, its forelimb- and chest-bones are notable for its high number of apomorphies related to the loss of flying ability. The sternum was notably more reduced than in the Laysan rail (Zapornia palmeri) and Henderson crake (Z. atra), and in the holotype, the sternum was even partially unossified despite the bird being fully grown, and had 6 large holes which would have prevented the development of anything but vestigial pectoral muscles. The scapula, too, had been altered more than in the Laysan rail, though the Henderson crake's scapula approached the condition seen in "P." severnsi; the coracoid, on the other hand, as usual for flightless rails of subfamily Himantornithinae, had no obvious changes. Notably, the carpometacarpus also resembled that of volant relatives except for its rather small size, while it is usually adapted to flightlessness in one way or another in the non-flying relatives. The humerus of the great Maui crake not only had an altogether larger number of features related to flightlessness than in related flightless species, but most remarkably a twisted head with a well-developed ventral knob, which is a combination not found among flightless Zapornia, as far as is known. Of all proposed relatives, only the Great Oʻahu rail had a humerus more radically adapted to the flightless state – but this little-known species might not belong to the himanthornithine subfamily.

At the time of its description, the great Maui crake was placed in genus Porzana, which at that time was already suspected to be a polyphyletic assemblage of rails which consisted of at least 2 different lineages. Cladistic analyses were conducted for the species, but the results are not consistent: In 1998 it was analyzed in a combined group together with the other extinct Hawaiian rails in a morphology-based analysis. This analysis could only place it with certainty within a group which roughly corresponds to subfamily Himanthornithinae as it is circumscribed today; as later analyses revealed that the Hawaiian rails are almost certainly not a monophyletic group, it is unsurprising that the chimeric combined pseudo-"taxon" could not be placed more certainly. The morphological data were included in a 2021 study which also utilized DNA sequence data to create a well-supported framework aiding placement of prehistoric species for which no molecular data was available. Here, the great Maui crake was resolved as sister species to the small Maui crake ("P." keplerorum), and these two in turn as sisters to the Laysan rail (Zapornia palmeri), suggesting the Maui crakes are both also members of the revalidated genus Zapornia, which was long included in Porzana.

However, ancient DNA had successfully been isolated from both Maui crakes, and used in a molecular phylogenetic analysis; here, the Maui crakes did not turn up as sister species, but while the smaller species was indeed clearly part of the Zapornia clade, the relationships of "P." severnsi could not be determined with any amount of certainty. What seems clear is that it was not part of the lineage of the Spotless crake (Zapornia tabuensis) and its closest relatives; however, as of 2023 neither the raw DNA sequence data, nor details and results of the analytical methods beyond a brief summary in 2003 had been published. As the sister genus of Zapornia, Rallina, was at that time still believed to be a very distantly related lineage of rails, it is unlikely to have been included in the analysis, which also probably used only a few short snippets of DNA. Consequently, with limited data and probably lacking the proper outgroup to Zapornia, all that can be concluded from the molecular analysis is that "P." severnsi might have belonged to a different branch of Zapornia than the Spotless crake – in line with the 2021 study –, or it might have been a distinct lineage in tribe Zapornini, or – less likely – belonged to another tribe of Himanthornithinae. If this is true, the morphological similarities between the Maui crakes found in the 2021 analysis would represent convergent evolution, e.g. due to the limited ecosystem diversity on Maui enforcing similar adaptations in both species. In any case, placement in genus Porzana is almost certainly wrong, as this has turned out to be a lineage of Himatornithidae that is entirely unrelated to Zapornia.

== Ecology and extinction ==
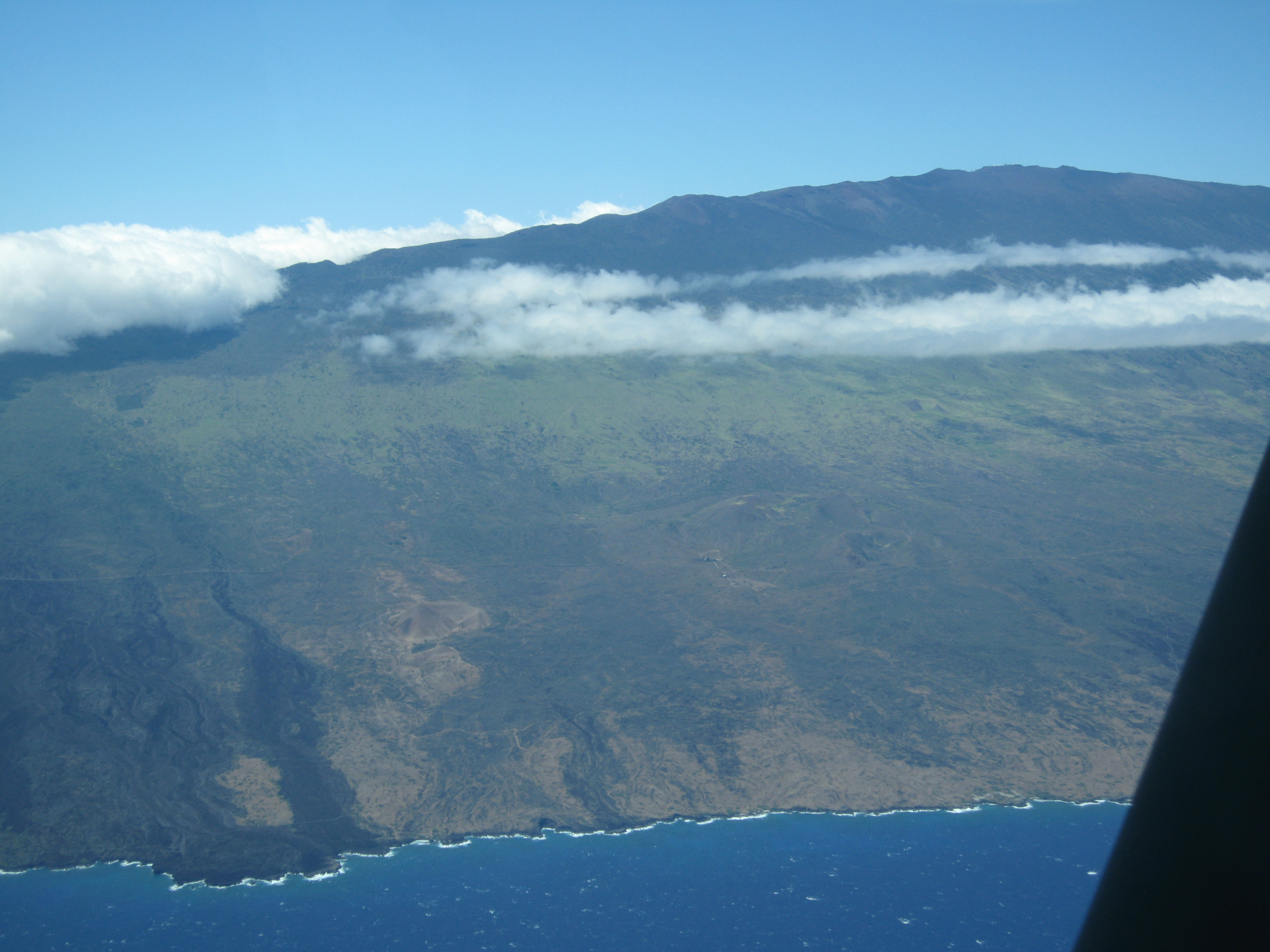
The drier western part of the great Maui crake's known range. The visible coastline is almost exactly adjacent to that in the image below. Many localities where remains of the species were found are in the upper left quarter of the photo.

Its ecology is mostly conjectural, but not likely to have differed much from the still-extant, slightly smaller, and probably fairly closely related Henderson crake. It was almost certainly omnivorous, feeding mostly on invertebrates, seeds, and perhaps occasionally fruit, bird eggs, and carrion. The shape of the fossil premaxilla and mandible suggests that its bill was moderately robust, of modest height, with only a slight curve at the very tip, and notably compressed laterally; while the premaxillary symphysis is quite short, the mandibular symphysis is a remarkably long and troughlike fusion of the mandibular rami – compared to the similar-sized Great Oʻahu crake which presumably ate similar-sized items, the Maui species was better able to extract food from small and narrow crevices, with the stiff and narrow mandible especially suited for open-mouthed probing. The great Maui crake's remains have so far been found only on the drier parts of Haleakalā, but below the almost desert-like upper slopes, in a region which even before human settlement and associated deforestation was mostly covered in shrubland and open koa/ʻōhiʻa lehua forest and at least seasonally arid.

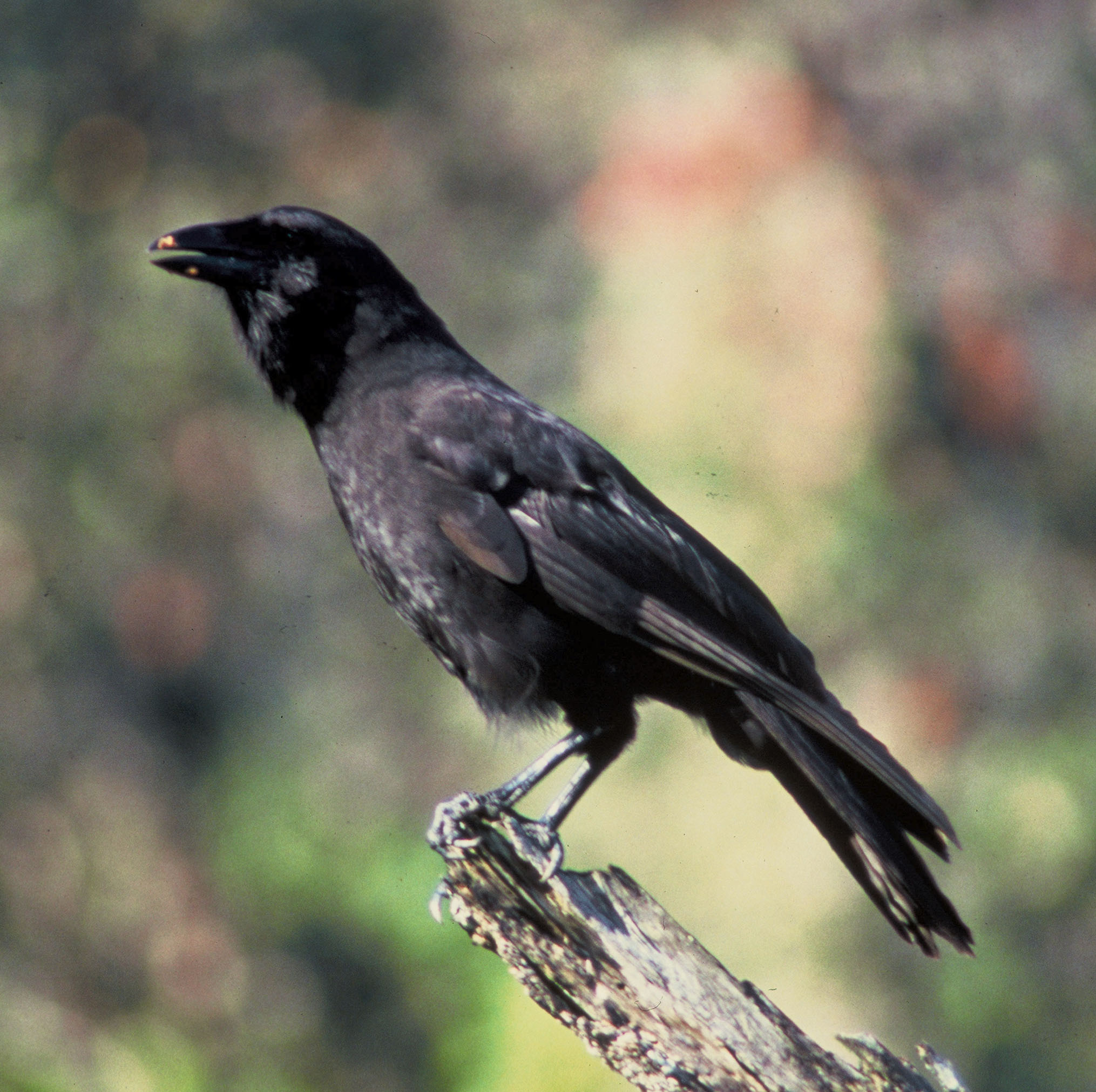
The Hawaiian crow or ʻalalā once inhabited Maui, and probably preyed on great Maui crakes occasionally. Today, it is extinct in the wild.

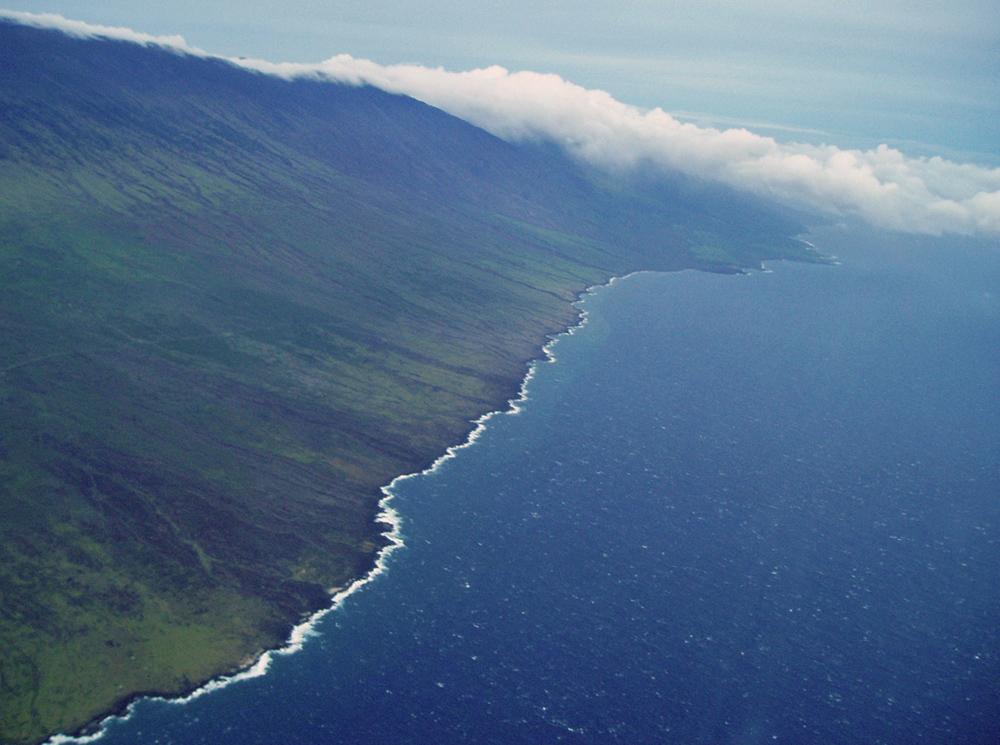
The more humid eastern part of the species' known range. Note rain clouds barely extending to the leeward side of Haleakalā. Lava tubes near the center of the photo have yielded additional remains of this rail.

Its flightlessness indicates that predation pressure was not overly strong; at any rate, mammalian predators were absent on Maui before humans arrived. Of the animals that might have preyed on "P." severnsi, the pueo owl still inhabits the island today, while Great and Lesser frigatebirds roam the offshore waters and occasionally venture overland to forage for small land animals; all these species would have posed a threat to an unwary great Maui crake. More dangerous would have been the Hawaiian hawk and – especially during nesting – the ʻalalā and Robust crows, which are not found on Maui today. The ʻalalā crow persisted at least to the initial stages of humans settlement, and is attested for this island by subfossil remains, while the Robust crow and the hawk are not, so either their breeding population on Maui was small, or they only ever occurred there as vagrants: prehistoric hawk remains are rare on all islands which formerly made up Maui Nui, while on Oʻahu to the northwest and the Big Island to the southeast they are much more numerous. The Robust crow, meanwhile, was abundant on Molokaʻi near Maui and was also found in Oʻahu deposits further away, proving that it had the capability to reach Maui too. In addition, Maui probably was visited by vagrant individuals, or even held a resident population, of the mime harrier, which resembled a sparrowhawk in wing anatomy and probably hunted small birds in the shrubbery; while it was specialized for feeding on songbirds like Hawaiian honeycreepers, it was perfectly capable of preying at least on juvenile great Maui rails too. Finally, the Maui stilt-owl, which could hunt equally well on the wing and on foot, was the smallest member of its genus Grallistrix, roughly the size of a Desert owl. Technically, it could tackle a half-grown great Maui crake, or an adult it surprised while asleep – but it probably was only barely capable of subdueing a full-grown and alert adult "P." severnsi: similar-sized owls generally eat prey weighing less than 50 g (about 2 oz), and rarely ever attack animals the presumed weight of an adult great Maui crake. In this regard, the different abundances of the two Maui crakes among the remains of Maui's prehistoric birds are notable – usually, of two coexisting and closely related species with similar habits, the smaller species is expected to be more numerous (as was the case with the extinct rails on Oʻahu), but among Maui crakes it seems to have been the other way around. Possibly, the stilt-owl preyed extensively on the smaller rail and largely avoided the larger one, and/or the larger rail was unusually fecund, with a clutch size of around 6 eggs as is typical for volant Zapornia and Rallina, and unlike the 2-3 eggs attested for the flightless and island-dwelling Laysan rail and Henderson crake. What is clear is that the stilt-owl was found in the very same deposits that yielded material of the great Maui crake, and that some ecological factor or parameter must have differed strongly between the two rail species.

Other than in Auwahi Cave, remains of this species have also been found in several other lava caves on the southern slope of Haleakalā, as well as in the Lower Waihoi Valley Cave about halfway between Hana and Kīpahulu near the eastern tip of the island, i.e. basically all across the southern part of today's Hana district. It ranged from sea level at least halfway up Haleakalā, and possibly as high as 1,860 m above sea level. Whether it inhabited other parts of Maui – such as the tropical rainforest on the northeastern slope of Haleakalā –, or whether it was restricted to the semi-arid woodland habitat where its remains were found, is not yet known; as of 2023 no deposits elsewhere on Maui have been studied. Before human settlement, and to some extent even today, similar habitat to where the great Maui crake's remains were found extended to the western side of Haleakalā, and all the way to the West Maui Mountains which form the island's western end.

Before humans arrived, at least on eastern Maui the great Maui crake was apparently far more plentiful than its smaller relative; it is attested by abundant remains whereas considerably less "P." keplerorum material was recovered. While no "P." severnsi were found in a cultural context such as a village hearth or midden yet, it is very likely that the great Maui crake was eaten by Polynesian settlers, especially after the giant flightless moa-nalo ducks had been hunted to extinction. It may have also been predated by Polynesian rats that were introduced by those settlers. In addition, the region where its remains were discovered is one of the most long-standing areas of dryland taro cultivation on Maui, and was extensively deforested starting about 1400 CE, which possibly decreased the carrying capacity for any remaining rails and certainly increased opportunities for people to hunt them. By November 26 1778, when Maui was discovered by Europeans, the species was apparently entirely extinct already.
