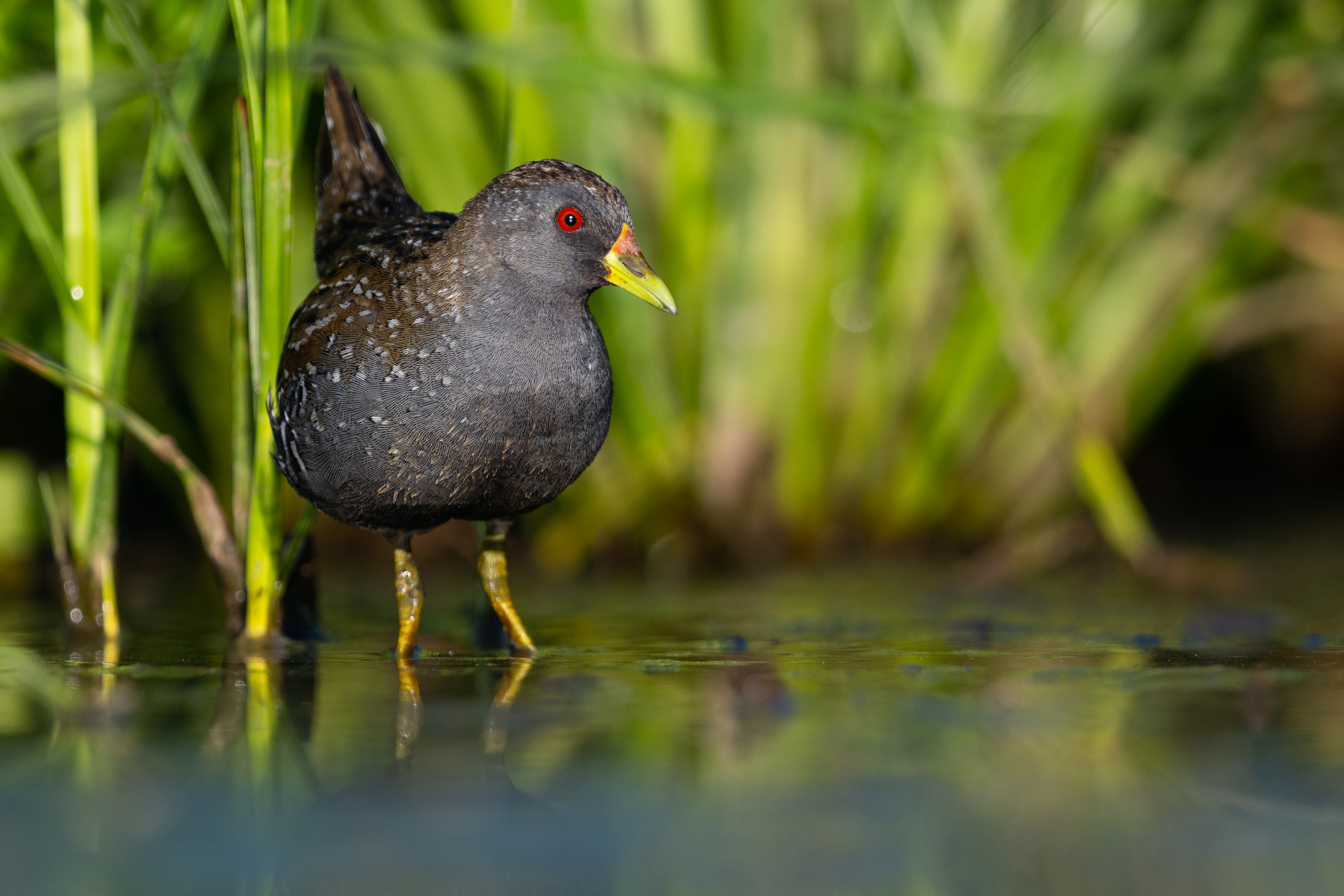
- In New South Wales, Australia

Conservation status
- Least Concern (IUCN 3.1)

Scientific classification
- Kingdom: Animalia
- Phylum: Chordata
- Class: Aves
- Order: Gruiformes
- Family: Rallidae
- Genus: Porzana
- Species: P. fluminea

Binomial name
- Porzana fluminea Gould, 1843

= Australian crake =

Species of bird

The Australian crake (Porzana fluminea), also known as Australian spotted crake, or spotted crake is a species of bird in the family Rallidae. It is the only species of Australian crake in the genus Porzana.

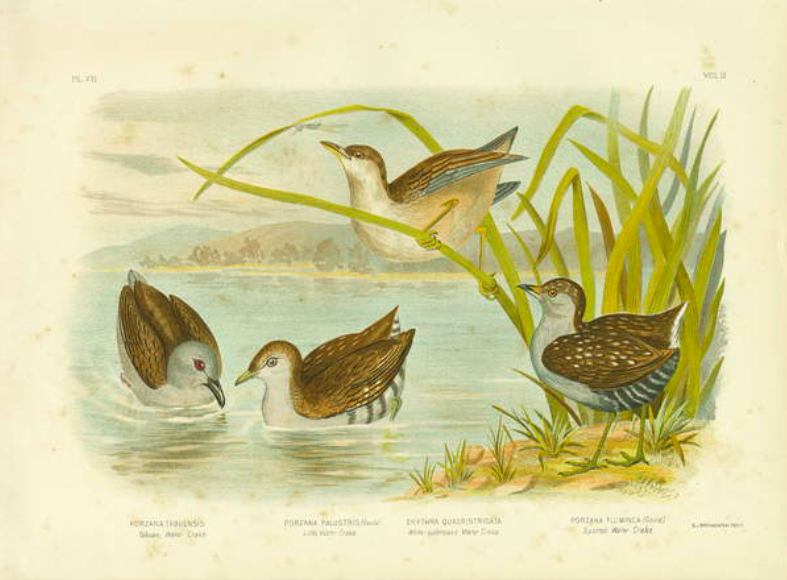
Australian crake (far right). 1891 lithograph by Gracius Broinowski.

== Taxonomy ==
The Australian crake was formally described in 1843 by the English ornithologist John Gould and given the binomial name Porzana fluminea. He specified the type locality as New South Wales. The specific epithet is from Latin flumineus meaning "riverine" (from flumen meaning "river"). The species is monotypic: no subspecies are recognised.

== Description ==
The Australian crake measures 19–23 cm (7.5–9.1 in) in length, weighs 55–70 g (1.9–2.5 oz) and has a wingspan of 27–33 cm (11–13 in). It is similar in appearance and behaviour to Baillon's crake (Porzana pusilla), but the Australian crake is stockier and darker overall and lacks the distinctive barred undertail of the Baillon's crake (Porzana pusilla). The Australian crake has a sooty face with steel-blue/dark grey breast, belly and throat. Brown upperparts, including the crown, are streaked black and white, with barred black and white flanks. Shorter undertail coverts are black and longer undertail coverts are white, forming a distinctive upside down V when tail is cocked. The outermost primaries have a distinctly white leading edge that is visible during flight. The bill is yellow-green with red base to upper mandible and measures 1.8–2.1 cm (0.71–0.83 in). Legs and feet are also yellow-green and the iris is red. While Gould asserted in The Birds of Australia (Gould) that "the sexes present so little difference in colour, that they are only to be distinguished by dissection", it can be noted that the female is slightly smaller and paler than male with a brown stripe across upper lores and more defined white spots on breast and neck. Immature birds are paler again with white fringed plumage on belly and breast appearing like muted barring. Juveniles are similar to adults but lack the steel-blue/dark grey plumage and instead have brown and white speckled underparts, as well as a brown iris and no red on bill. Chicks have very plumulaceous black feathers with a deep green hue and a distinctive, red blaze to base of upper mandible.

== Distribution and habitat ==
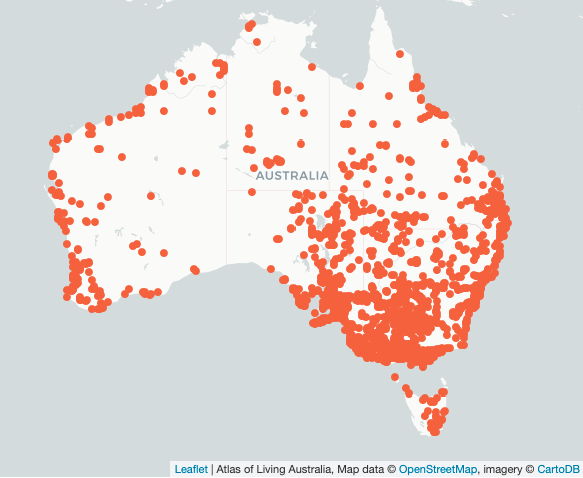
Australian crake distribution.

Endemic to Australia, the Australian crake can be found throughout southeast and Western Australia. It is less common in Tasmania and tropical areas of northern Australia. The Australian crake lives in both coastal and inland habitats in freshwater, brackish, marine and terrestrial environments where it prefers densely vegetated areas of marshes, swamps, estuaries and saltmarshes that support lignum, chenopods, rushes and sedges. Distribution and movement is dependent on water conditions, so following periods of high rainfall, range can extend inland to areas like Alice Springs/Mparntwe.

== Behaviour and ecology ==
=== Food and feeding ===
Foraging often occurs in pairs, family groups and sometimes, when food is abundant, in large groups of up to 100 individuals. Densely vegetated areas amongst reeds, on mudflats or in shallow water (below 5 cm in depth) are favoured, where a variety of foods are enjoyed including; aquatic plants, algae, seeds, molluscs, crustaceans, spiders, tadpoles and insects, both adult and larval, in orders including Dermaptera, Orthoptera, Coleoptera, Diptera, Lepidoptera and Hymenoptera. These birds forage by probing the ground, wading and swimming, submerging their heads underwater and knocking larger food items against the ground by the water's edge.

=== Breeding ===
Breeding occurs between August–February. Nests are often over or beside water 2–50 cm (0.79–19.69 in) above waterline within reeds, rushes, grasses and low shrubs. Additional nesting materials of rushes or grasses are laid over the nest in an inverted dome shape, and foliage is often flattened in an approach-ramp or stage leading up to the nest. Nests of individual mating pairs are often found together, with as many as 30 individual nests in a group. Clutches are of 3-6 eggs that are pale brown with dark brown, red-brown and black spots. The eggs are incubated by both parents. The young are precocial and nidifugous. Both sexes accompany the young.

== Conservation ==
Although the Australian crake is listed as Least Concern, habitat loss, invasive and feral animals, agriculture and livestock grazing and climate change are threats to this species and the conservation of wetlands is fundamental to the survival of this species.
