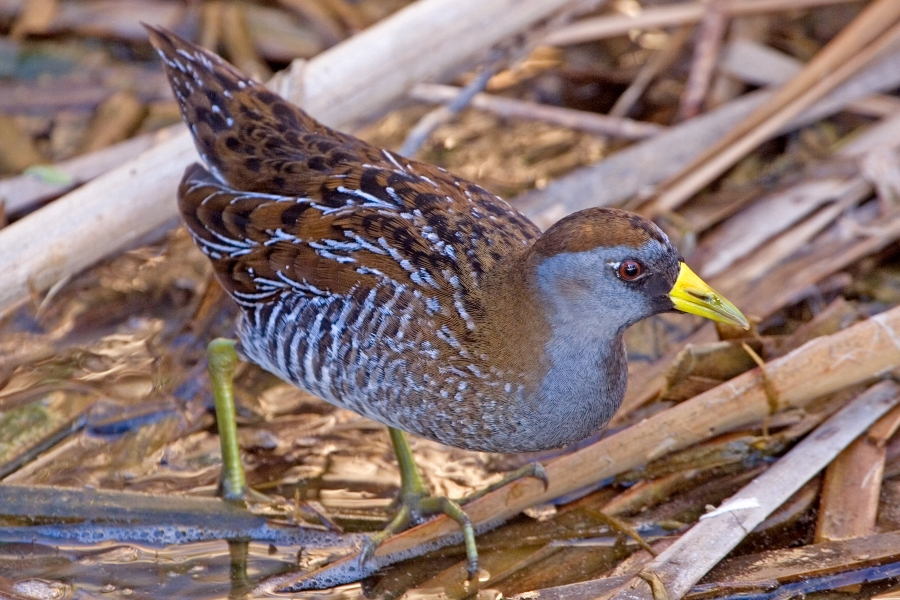

Conservation status
- Least Concern (IUCN 3.1)

Scientific classification
- Kingdom: Animalia
- Phylum: Chordata
- Class: Aves
- Order: Gruiformes
- Family: Rallidae
- Genus: Porzana
- Species: P. carolina

Binomial name
- Porzana carolina (Linnaeus, 1758)
- Breeding Migration Resident Nonbreeding

Synonyms
- Rallus carolinus Linnaeus, 1758

Audio
- Whinny call recorded in Minnesota

= Sora (bird) =

Species of bird

The sora, sora rail or Carolina crake (Porzana carolina) is a small waterbird of the rail family Rallidae, sometimes also referred to as the sora rail or sora crake, that occurs throughout much of North America. The genus name Porzana is derived from Venetian terms for small rails, and the specific carolina refers to the Carolina Colony. The common name "Sora" is probably derived from a Native American language.

They migrate to the southern United States and northern South America. The sora is a very rare vagrant to western Europe, where it can be confused with spotted crake. However, the latter species always has spotting on the breast, a streaked crown stripe, and a different wing pattern.

Soras forage while walking or swimming. They are omnivores, eating seeds, insects and snails. Although soras are more often heard than seen, they are sometimes seen walking near open water. They are fairly common, despite a decrease in suitable habitat in recent times. The call is a slow whistled ker-whee, or a descending whinny.

== Taxonomy ==
The sora was formally described by the Swedish naturalist Carl Linnaeus in 1758 in the tenth edition of his Systema Naturae. He placed it with the rails in the genus Rallus and coined the binomial name Rallus carolinus. Linnaeus based his description on the "little American water hen" that George Edwards had described and illustrated in 1750 from a specimen collected near the Hudson Bay. Linnaeus also cited Mark Catesby who had described the "soree" in his The Natural History of Carolina, Florida and the Bahama Islands. The sora is now placed in the genus Porzana that was erected in 1816 by the French ornithologist Louis-Pierre Vieillot. The genus name is derived from Venetian terms for small rails, the specific epithet refers to the Carolina Colony. The common name "Sora" is probably derived from a Native American language. The species in monotypic: no subspecies are recognised.

== Description ==
Adult soras are 19–30 cm (7.5–11.8 in) long, with dark-marked brown upperparts, a blue-grey face and underparts, and black and white barring on the flanks. They have a short thick yellow bill, with black markings on the face at the base of the bill and on the throat. Sexes are similar, but young soras lack the black facial markings and have a whitish face and buff breast. They weigh about 49–112 g (1.7–4.0 oz) and have a wingspan of 35–40 cm. Soras have two common calls: a loud, squeaking "whinny" that decelerates and descends in pitch, often used to advertise territories; and a softer, ascending "ker-wee" or "sor-ah". The latter call is sometimes presented as a possible origin for the species' common name.

== Distribution and habitat ==
The sora is common across North America, naturally occurring in 49 US states (the exception being Hawaii), all 10 Canadian provinces and two Canadian territories. Outside of the US and Canada, the species is found throughout Central America, the Caribbean, and northern South America. The species has been recorded as a vagrant in Iceland, Great Britain, Portugal, and at Lake Titicaca.

Soras breed from Nova Scotia northwest to southern Yukon and Northwest Territories, south to California, Arizona, and New Mexico and northeast to Pennsylvania and New England. Sora wintering grounds include the Caribbean, northern portions of South America, including Ecuador, Colombia, and Venezuela, north through Central America and Mexico to southern California in the West and coastal regions of the Southeast. From southern Kansas south to northern and eastern Texas and east through the inland areas of the southeastern United States, soras are typically only observed during migration in the spring and fall. In a few areas of the western United States, including central California and areas of Arizona and New Mexico, soras may occur year-round.

The size of an individual sora's home range varies. Sora brood-rearing home ranges in northwestern Iowa averaged 0.5 acres (0.20 ha). In Arizona, sora home range size varied from 1.5 acres (0.61 ha) in the early breeding season to over 2 acres (0.81 ha) in the postbreeding season. These seasonal differences in sora home range size were not significant (p>0.05).

Densities vary from to 12 soras/acre in Colorado to 0.47 pair/ha in Indiana. An average of 1.3 soras/ha responded to calls across sites in Colorado. A similar density of soras was found in southeastern Wisconsin. In Iowa, average density over two years and several marsh habitats was 1.3 pairs/ha. Landscape factors, such as marsh area, habitat edges within marshes, and the number of marshes in a region may influence soras.

Although soras occur in marshes of all sizes, they may occur at higher densities in intermediate-sized marshes. Soras were significantly (p≤0.01) positively related with total wetland area and perimeter area of surface water in east and central Maine and were significantly (p<0.05) positively related to area of wetlands in Saskatchewan. In Maine, soras used 10% of 2.5 acres (1.0 ha) wetlands, 40% to 50% of wetlands from 2.5–5 acres (1.0–2.0 ha) in size, and 20% of wetlands larger than 50 acres (20 ha). In western New York, soras were significantly (p=0.007) more abundant in marshes from 100 to 250 acres (40 to 101 ha) in size than in smaller (< 100 acres (40 ha)) or larger (250–380 acres (100–150 ha)) marshes. In addition, sora nests were detected more often in the 100–200 acres (40–81 ha) marshes.

Soras are commonly reported in plant communities dominated by cattails (Typha spp.), sedges (Carex spp.), bulrushes (Scirpus spp.), smartweeds (Polygonum spp.), rushes (Juncus spp.), rice cutgrass (Leersia oryzoides), and barnyard grasses (Echinochloa spp.).

Soras also seem to prefer edge habitats. Breeding sora density was significantly (p<0.001) correlated (r=0.62) with the perimeter:area ratio of northwestern Iowa marshes. The distance from the center of sora territories to a habitat edge was also significantly (p<0.005) less than from the center of Virginia rail territories. In Arizona, habitat edges were closer to sora heavy use areas than random sites.

Wetland dynamics at a large scale can affect soras. Indices of sora population at three "levels of response" were significantly (p<0.01) correlated (r≥0.70) with the number of ponds present in the prairie pothole region of North Dakota in May.

Outside of wetlands, soras are most often reported in cultivated areas during migration or in the postbreeding period. For instance, a sora was observed 3 mi (4.8 km) from marshland in a cultivated field in Iowa in the middle of August. A male sora was observed less than 1,000 ft (300 m) from a large wetland in a soybean (Glycine max) field in northwestern Iowa during the postbreeding period. From early June to mid-July, soras were observed on farms in Saskatchewan sown mainly with wheat (Triticum aestivum).

Soras have also been reported in flooded wooded areas. In western New York, soras occurred during the breeding season on a study site where 26% of the area was categorized as "flooded timber," and 5% was classed as "scrub/shrub marsh". In eastern and central Maine, an average of 2.1 soras was observed in wooded swamps per 100 hours of observation during the breeding season. On a nonbreeding (August–April) site in southwestern Arizona, soras were found to use a "mixed shrub community" more than expected based on its availability. Soras were observed at low abundances on a site with douglas-fir (Pseudotsuga menziesii), ponderosa pine (Pinus ponderosa), and trembling aspen (Populus tremuloides) in British Columbia.

Soras use areas with a wide range of water depths. They are often observed in water less than 1 ft (30 cm) deep, although the average water depth of sora heavy-use areas in Arizona was 20 in (51 cm). In northwestern Iowa, average water depth in sora territories was 15 in (38 cm), which was significantly (p<0.025) more shallow than water depths at random locations in the marsh. Sora nesting sites occurred in shallower water than random sites in western New York. Average water depths reported at nest sites range from 4 in (10 cm) for 4 sora nests in Colorado to nearly 10 in (25 cm) for sora nests in western New York. In areas of deep water, soras typically wade on mats of floating vegetation.

Water level fluctuations may result in nest abandonment. For example, at a site in Colorado where water level increased more than 8 in (20 cm), a sora nest with 7 eggs was abandoned. In Alberta, soras nested in more vegetation types during a drought year, most likely due to substantially reduced water levels in the vegetation used the previous year.

Soras use areas with shallower water in fall than in spring. Soras typically avoid open water. There is a significant (p≤0.05) negative relationship between area of open water and sora use of wetlands in Maine and sora relative abundance in Saskatchewan. In western New York, sora nesting sites had a lower percentage of open water than random sites, and in Arizona soras used open water areas less than their availability.

Sora nesting sites had larger percentage of emergent vegetation than random sites in marshes of western New York. Sora numbers in wetlands of northeastern North Dakota were significantly (p<0.05) positively correlated (r=0.45) with hectares of live emergent vegetation. In east and central Maine, wetlands used by soras had significantly (p=0.01) greater area of emergent vegetation than unused wetlands.

Density of emergent vegetation in sora habitat varies. Reported density of emergent vegetation ranges from an average of 121.9 stems/m^{2} in sora territories in northwestern Iowa to 333 stems/m^{2} on sites in northeastern Missouri used during fall migration. In western New York, cover was greater than 70% at 95% of sora nests. In addition, nesting sites had more horizontal cover at 20 inches (0.5 m) above water level than random sites. However, average stem density on sora territories was not significantly (p>0.05) different from random sites in northwestern Iowa.

Height of emergent vegetation in sora habitat also varies. It ranged from 8 to 11 in (20 to 28 cm) in the spring after a winter disturbance in northwestern Iowa to 84 in (210 cm) in areas heavily used by soras in Arizona. In marshes of western New York, average vegetation height at sora nesting sites was shorter than at random locations. However, the average height of emergent vegetation in sora territories in northeastern Iowa was not significantly (p>0.05) different from the height of vegetation in random plots.

In Arizona, both cover and height of vegetation used by soras varied with seasons. Conway suggested the differences likely reflected the varied diet of the sora. The availability of habitat in different seasons is another possible source of seasonal differences in sora habitat.

Extent of woody vegetation surrounding South Dakota wetlands was not significantly (p=0.6) associated with sora occurrence. However, in marshes of western New York, there was a significant (p=0.041) negative relationship between percent flooded timber on a site and sora relative abundance.

Soras may prefer some cover types. In Arizona, 65.3% of sora use was in southern cattail (Typha domingensis), although it accounted for only 16.5% of the vegetation. Bulrushes and a mixed-shrub community were also used more than their availability, while saltcedar (Tamarix chinensis) and arrowweed (Pluchea sericea) were avoided. A literature review notes sora avoidance of purple loosestrife (Lythrum salicaria)-dominated sites. In east and central Maine, wetlands used by soras had significantly (p=0.05) more ericaceous vegetation, such as leatherleaves (Chamaedaphne spp.), sweetgales (Myrica spp.), and laurels (Kalmia spp.). In marshes of northwestern Iowa, broadleaf arrowhead (Sagittaria latifolia) occurred in sora territories significantly (p<0.01) more often than at random sites. Johnson and Dinsmore imply that this likely results from both species preferring similar site conditions. In May and June in Wisconsin, soras were detected significantly (p<0.025) more often in cattail (Typha spp.) survey areas than in sedge areas. However, in southeastern Wisconsin during the breeding season, there was no significant (p=0.943) difference in sora densities between habitats composed predominantly of cattail, sedge, or bulrush. In addition, soras' use of glaucous cattail (Typha × glauca), broadfruit bur-reed (Sparganium eurycarpum), sedge, river bulrush (Schoenoplectus fluviatilis), and hardstem bulrush (S. acutus var. acutus) habitats in marshes of northwestern Iowa generally reflected availability of these habitats.

Seasonal differences in sora habitat use have been reported. In northeastern Missouri in spring, the likelihood of detecting sora in robust emergents, such as cattail (Typha spp.) and longroot smartweed (Polygonum amphibium var. emersum), was over 6 times that of detecting soras in these areas in fall. However, availability of habitats during various times of the year was not addressed. In a study performed in southeastern Missouri, plant species used by sora during spring and fall migration differed significantly (p=0.005). However, the author qualifies this finding with his observation of major seasonal differences in vegetation availability.

Temperature may also influence sora abundance. In Colorado, average April temperature was significantly (p<0.01) negatively correlated (r= -0.94) with sora abundance. On sites that had average April temperatures ≤ 42 °F (6 °C), soras were more abundant than the closely related Virginia rail (Rallus limicola), while on warmer sites the sora to Virginia rail ratio declined.

=== Migration ===
They migrate to the southern United States, the Caribbean, and northern South America. Sora is a very rare vagrant to western Europe, where it can be confused with spotted crake. However, the latter species always has spotting on the breast. a streaked crown stripe, and a different wing pattern.

Soras forage while walking or swimming. They are omnivores, eating seeds, insects and snails. Although soras are more often heard than seen, they are sometimes seen walking near open water. They are fairly common, despite a decrease in suitable habitat in recent times. The call is a slow whistled ker-whee, or a descending whinny. The use of call broadcasts greatly increases the chances of hearing a sora. Call broadcasts can also increase the chances of seeing a sora, as they will often investigate the source of the call.

Sora's northern migration occurs in spring, primarily in April and May. For instance, in east-central Kansas significantly (p<0.05) more soras were detected from 24 April to 7 May than the 2-week periods before or after. In southeast Missouri, soras were observed from 25 March to 6 May. Soras were first detected in April to early May in Colorado, Iowa, and Minnesota. In a summary of the first detections of soras in Minnesota, Manitoba, and Saskatchewan, all occurred in April.

Soras depart their breeding grounds as early as July and as late as October. Soras were observed returning to wintering grounds in Arizona as early as late July. Although local movements may obscure migration occurring in July, most migration occurred in August and September in Colorado. In northern Ohio, sora abundance was increased in late August and September by migrating individuals. In southeastern Missouri, soras were observed from 5 September to 27 October. Soras have been observed in Manitoba and Saskatchewan as late as October.

== Behavior and ecology ==
=== Breeding ===
Although sora nesting activities have been observed from late April through early August, the peak nesting period typically occurs from May to early July. In New York, nesting was initiated in late April. A nest search and literature review study of soras in Colorado reports a clutch initiated in early August. However, mean clutch initiation dates occurred in May and June in regions across the state. Studies from northern Ohio, North Dakota, and Alberta report nesting from May to July. In a review, sora nests with eggs were recorded from early May to early July in Indiana.

The sora's breeding habitat is marshes throughout much of North America. They nest in a well-concealed location in dense vegetation. Sora females begin construction of saucer-shaped nests on the ground or on a platform over shallow water at the start of egg laying. Clutch sizes typically range from 8 to 13 eggs, although clutch sizes of up to 16 have been reported. Both parents incubate the eggs. Incubation lasts approximately 19 days, although a wide range of incubation periods has been reported in the literature. Eggs hatch over a span of 2 to 13 days. Soras also appear to exhibit egg discrimination behavior, in which they will bury and refuse to incubate irregular eggs. Nestlings are precocial and are capable of walking and swimming short distances (< 3 ft (0.91 m)) by the end of their first day. Young soras are independent by about 4 weeks of age. Soras brood once per season. Some late broods may be second nesting attempts, but there is only one report in the literature of a second brood attempt after a successful nest. For information on breeding behavior of soras, see. For information on conspecific nest parasitism and egg discrimination in soras see.

Sora nest success rates vary across locations and years. In the literature addressing sora apparent nest success, the proportions of successful nests varied from 0.61 in Michigan to 0.833 in Minnesota. In western New York, the nest success rate of 6 sora nests was 0.43, and the daily nest success rate was 0.97. Using data from the Cornell Laboratory of Ornithology's nest record program, nesting success rate of soras in North America was estimated as 0.529 over a 28-day period (n=108). On a site in Alberta, 80.6% of eggs successfully hatched, while the following year only 59.6% of eggs hatched. The authors conclude that diminished water level interacting with predators and trampling by cattle resulted in decreased hatching success. During late summer, soras are flightless for a period during their post-nuptial molt.

=== Food and feeding ===
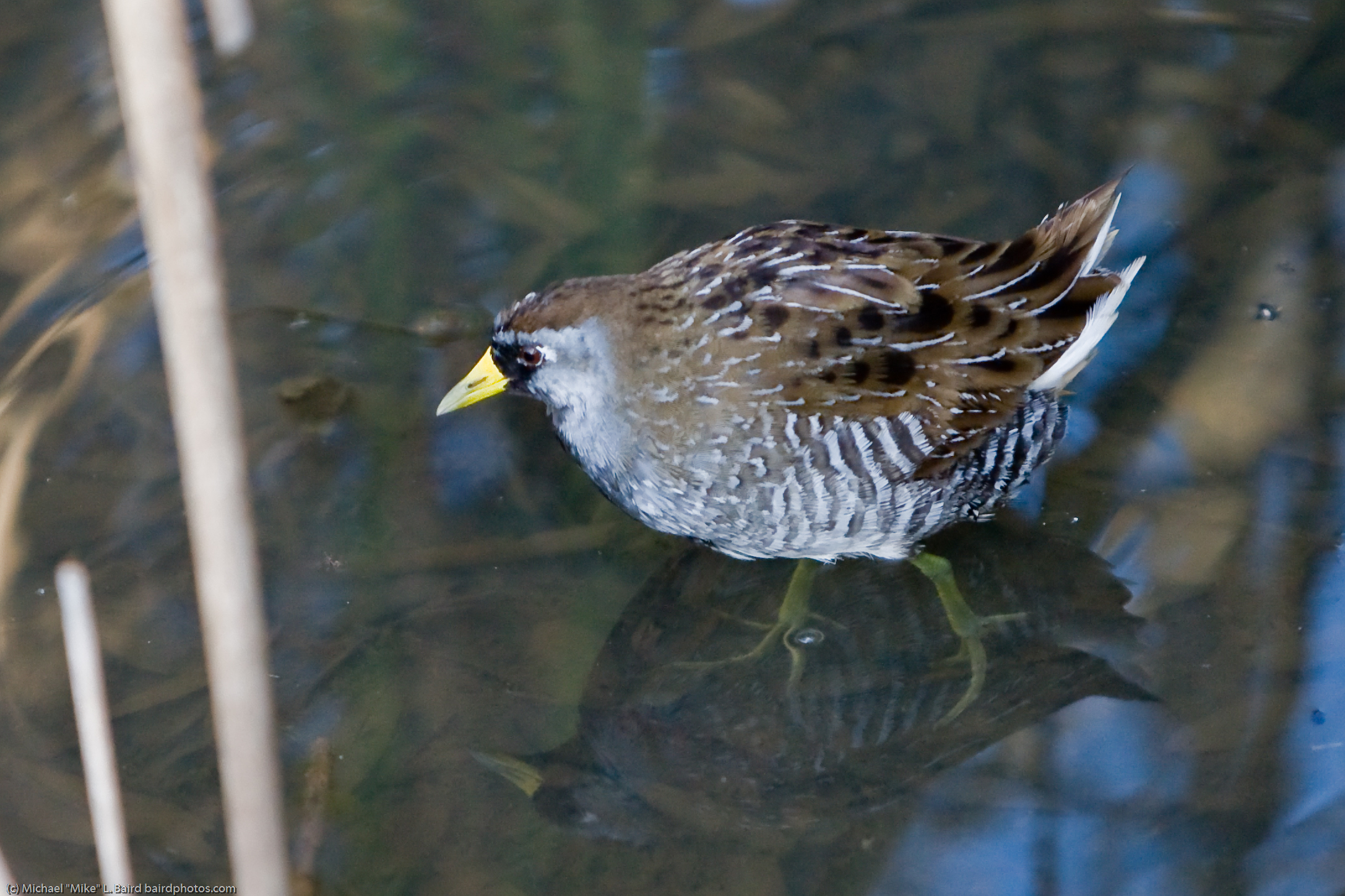
Sora foraging in water

Soras eat a wide range of foods. Animals that are commonly reported as sora food items include snails (Gastropoda), crustaceans (Crustacea), spiders (Araneae), and insects (Insecta), mainly beetles (Coleoptera), grasshoppers (Orthoptera), flies (Diptera), and dragonflies (Odonata). Soras often eat the seeds of plants, such as smartweeds, bulrushes, sedges, and barnyard grasses. Seeds of annual wildrice (Zizania aquatica) and rice cutgrass are eaten by soras in the eastern United States. A literature review lists crowngrass (Paspalum spp.) and rice (Oryza sativa) as relatively important food sources for soras in the Southeast. Plants composing less than 5% of the sora's diet are also listed and include spikerushes (Eleocharis spp.), duckweeds (Lemnaceae), pondweeds (Potamogeton spp.), panicgrasses (Panicum spp.), cordgrasses (Spartina spp.), and saltgrass (Distichlis spicata).

Soras eat more plant food in fall and winter (68%–69%) than in spring and summer (40%). Plant material such as hairy crabgrass (Digitaria sanguinalis), fall panicgrass (Panicum dichotomiflorum), and bristlegrass (Setaria spp.) occurred at substantially higher frequencies and in much larger volumes in sora esophagi collected in southeastern Missouri during fall migration than those collected in spring. In addition, animals were a larger volume of the spring diet than the fall diet. The volume of animal material in esophagi collected in spring was predominantly composed of adult beetles and snails from the Physidae family.

=== Survival ===
Few data are available on the survival of soras. Radio-marked soras in Arizona had a nonbreeding survival probability of 0.308. The authors suggest the low survival rate may be due to increased mortality of radio-marked birds. Likely causes of mortality are predation and human-caused sources such as road kill.

Sora eggs are eaten by several species including American minks (Neogale vison), skunks (Mephitidae), coyotes (Canis latrans), grackles (Quiscalus spp.), crows (Corvus spp.), and herons (Ardeidae). Predation of adult soras by American minks, coyotes, and hawks and owls have been reported.
