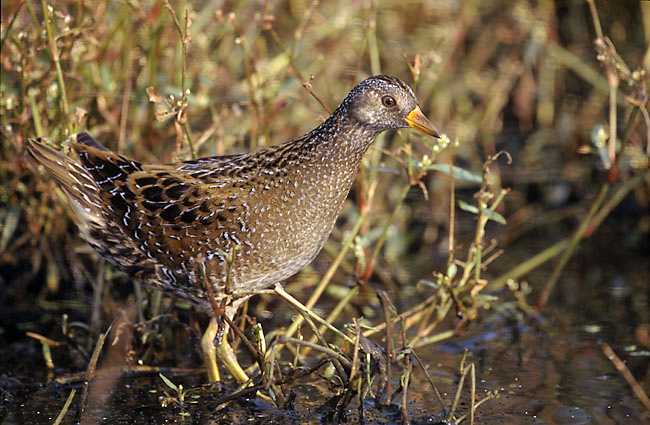
- Spotted crake (Porzana porzana)

Scientific classification
- Kingdom: Animalia
- Phylum: Chordata
- Class: Aves
- Order: Gruiformes
- Family: Rallidae
- Genus: Porzana; Vieillot, 1816

Type species
- Rallus porzana Linnaeus, 1766

Species
- see text

Synonyms
- see text

= Porzana =

Genus of birds

Porzana is a genus of birds in the crake and rail family, Rallidae. Its scientific name is derived from Venetian terms for small rails. The spotted crake (P. porzana) is the type species.

== Taxonomy ==
The genus Porzana was erected by the French ornithologist Louis Pierre Vieillot in 1816 with the spotted crake (Porzana porzana) as the type species. The genus unites the typical "crakes" found essentially anywhere in the world except desert and polar regions. It contains 3 living species. In addition, a large number of prehistorically extinct species known only from fossil or subfossil remains have been discovered. The genera Coturnicops, Crex (including Crecopsis) and Laterallus have been suggested to be closely related.

However, molecular phylogenetic analyses have confirmed the suspicion, raised in the late 20th century in the first cladistic studies of morphology, that the "genus" Porzana is rather an evolutionary grade, consisting of an assemblage of unrelated plesiomorphic rails. Micropygia is maintained as monotypic genus for the ocellated crake until its relationships are fully resolved. The ash-throated crake, which was only tentatively placed in Porzana, has been united with the two former species of Neocrex in Mustelirallus; they are almost certainly closely related to Pardirallus. The white-browed crake, meanwhile, is today usually placed in a monotypic genus Poliolimnas again, as it was by various authors in the past.

The molecular data find Crex part of a more ancient lineage including Gallirallus and Rallus however; this clade (without Crex) is also well supported by the morphological data, so the similarities between Crex and the crakes seem to be due to a convergent anatomy. Coturnicops and Laterallus, meanwhile, seem closely related to each other and at least the dot-winged crake and yellow-breasted crake as well as Anurolimnas, but not to the core group of Porzana. Part of Amaurornis seems to form a complex with the remaining small species of "Porzana"; the old name Zapornia is now re-established for these. Finally, there is Porzana proper, a group of a few fairly large species which seems close to the last common ancestor of coots and moorhens; the spot-flanked gallinule, presently placed in Gallinula or separated in a monotypic Porphyriops, may be a particularly close relative.

== Description and ecology ==
These birds are among the smaller members of their family, none being larger than a chicken and some really tiny, smaller than a starling or thrush. Their upperparts are a cryptic lighter or darker brownish hue. The underside is also brown in some, but more often buff or grey. Several species have patterns like whitish dots or black-and-white barred flanks, conspicuous close up, but at a distance providing additional camouflage in these birds' habitat. Some others are rather uniformly blackish-brown all over. The bill and feet are often brightly colored in red to yellow hues; the eyes' iris has some reddish-brownish hue, sometimes being bright red and also very conspicuous at close quarters. Porzana males and females generally differ barely if at all; in the little crake (P. parva), however, they differ so much they might be mistaken for separate species.

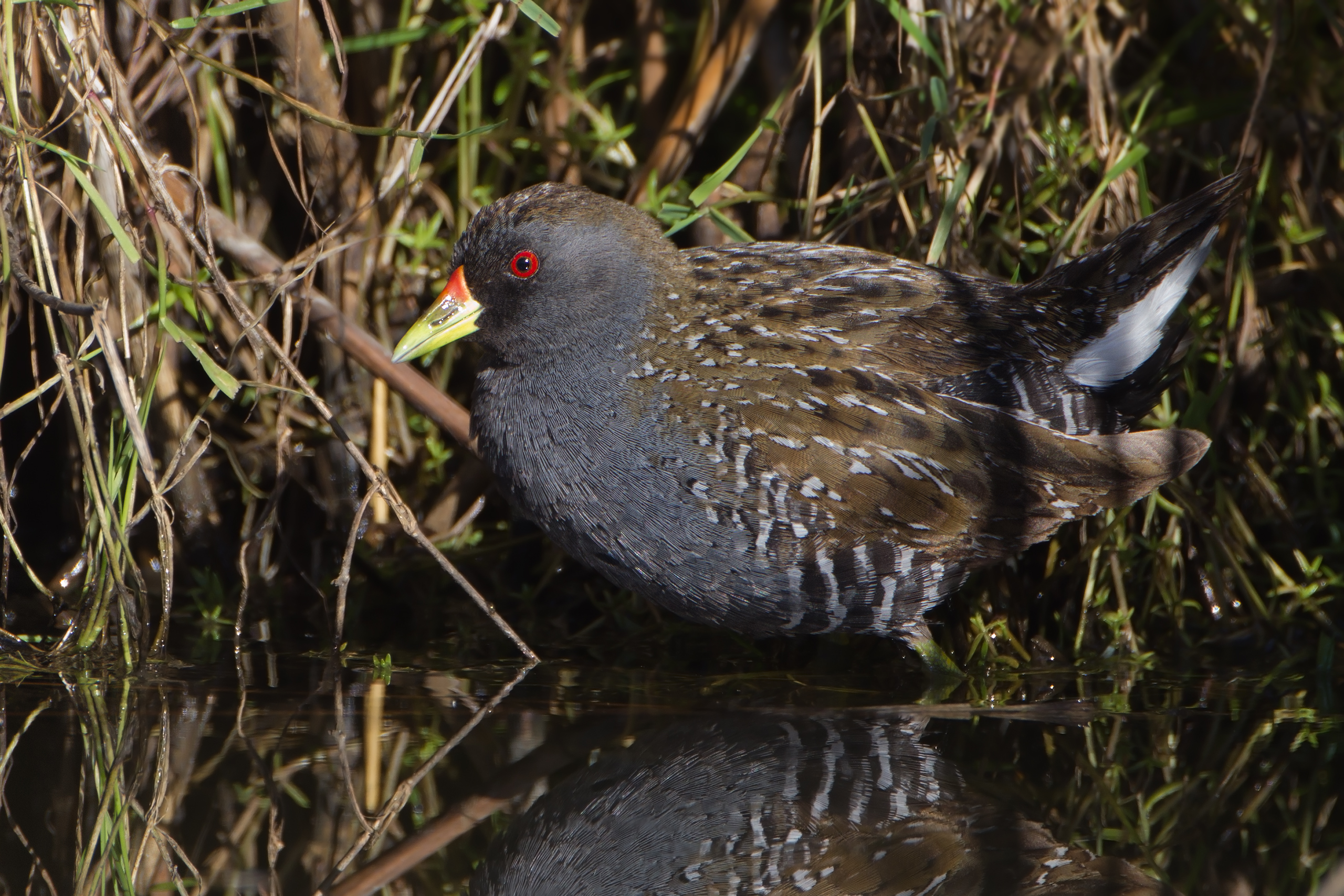
Australian crake (P. fluminea)

Most species of Porzana crakes inhabit wetlands. Some, however, are (or were) found on rocky islands with little water; even these, though, prefer places where abundant vegetation provides a dense ground-cover to hide in. They are usually reclusive and shy, but unlike the larger rails are active and inquisitive birds. When foraging, they will investigate anything that catches their attention and is not considered a predator; in some places, this even includes any humans and their food or equipment that visit these birds' habitat. Their food is mostly small invertebrates – typically arthropods and mollusks – as well as selected plants, seeds and fruit. This is complemented by any small vertebrate they can catch, such as a fish or frog. They can swim if they need to and even dive a bit, but not for extended distances; rather, they prefer to clamber through dense reeds to escape threats, or walk on floating vegetation or just passively drift around a spot when foraging.

As usual for Rallidae, their flight is rather clumsy and their navigation skills and ability to maintain course against the wind are poor; on the other hand, their stamina in the air is exception for their small size; several species migrate thousands of kilometers every spring and autumn, while others originated from wind-blown individuals swept to oceanic islands just as far away from any continent. In this regard, Porzana presently in fact stands supreme among the Rallidae, and even among birds in general it is quite remarkable for its radiation of oceanic island lineages. Gallirallus rivals it in extent, but unlike the cosmopolitan Porzana crakes these rails simply originate in the region next to Oceania and have otherwise not much spread beyond. Porzana species, by contrast, are attested from islands in almost every ocean. As usual for oceanic-island Rallidae, a number of them eventually became flightless due to the rarity of predators on their ocean homes; most of them went extinct from hunting and predation after humans and their accompanying animals reached these islands.

The social and sexual habits of this genus do not markedly differ from the usual standards of their family. They possess the typical complex repertoire of calls, usually quite high-pitched due to the small size (the namesake "crake" calls), but in some situations communicate with a surprisingly deep booming calls. Porzana crakes are monogamous and defend a territory during the breeding season. For the rest of the year, the pairs split and territories are abandoned; pairmates often choose a different partner for the next breeding season. The nest sites are typically in hidden spots at the water's edge, but can be in any dense clump of vegetation between shallow water and dry land as the situation requires. Not much effort is put into building the nest; usually the parents do little more than press down the plants with their bodies. However, the nest cup is carefully lined with soft dry plant material, feathers or hair, which the parents collect specifically for this purpose. The clutch is around 5–10 eggs (a few species have less) whose buffish color is more or less obscured by a rather even and dense cover of brown to purplish dots. The hatchlings are remarkably long-legged and covered blackish down feathers as is typical for rails and crakes. They are precocial and able to leave the nest immediately after recovering from hatching. After a few days they can accompany their parents on long walks, and the nest is soon deserted. After two months or so, the young learn to fly and are able to fend for their own, and have parted ways with their parents. If the pair nests early and/or the clutch fails, they will usually try to raise a second clutch in the same season.

== Extant and recently extinct species ==
The genus Porzana contains 3 living species.

Genus Porzana – Vieillot, 1816 – three species
Common name	Scientific name and subspecies	Range	Size and ecology	IUCN status and estimated population
Spotted crake	Porzana porzana (Linnaeus, 1766)	breeds in Europe and western Asia, winters in Africa and India	Size: Habitat: Diet:	LC
Australian crake	Porzana fluminea Gould, 1843	Australia	Size: Habitat: Diet:	LC
Sora	Porzana carolina (Linnaeus, 1758)	breeds in North America, winters around the Caribbean	Size: Habitat: Diet:	LC

== Prehistoric extinctions ==
It is to be expected that most or all of these species will be transferred to the genus Zapornia.

- "Porzana" keplerorum – Small Maui crake
- "Porzana" menehune – Liliput crake
- "Porzana" ralphorum Olson, 1973 – Great Oʻahu crake
- "Porzana" rua Steadman, 1986 – Mangaia crake
- "Porzana" severnsi Olson, 1973 – Great Maui crake
- "Porzana" ziegleri – Small Oʻahu crake
- "Porzana" sp. – Aiwa Levu crake
- "Porzana" sp. – Easter Island crake
- "Porzana" sp. – Great Big Island crake
- "Porzana" sp. – Great Kauaʻi crake
- "Porzana" sp. – Huahine crake
- "Porzana" sp. – Lesser Mangaia crake
- "Porzana" sp. – Malakula crake
- "Porzana" sp. – Marquesas crake(s) (Nuku Hiva, Ua Huka; up to 2 species)
- "Porzana" sp. – Marianas crake(s) (Aguijan, Guam, Rota, Tinian; up to 4 species)
- "Porzana" sp. – Medium Kauaʻi crake
- "Porzana" sp. – Medium Maui crake
- "Porzana" sp. - Medium O‘ahu crake – possibly same as "P." ralphorum or "P." ziegleri
- "Porzana" sp. – Small Big Island crake
- "Porzana" sp. – Ua Huka crake

=== Ancient fossils ===
By standards of their family, the fossil record of "Porzana" is not very comprehensive and modestly old. The most ancient fossils that were placed here date from about one dozen million years ago during the Astaracian. A few older fossils of extant rail lineages are known, suggesting that older Porzana (or at least Zapornia) fossils may also eventually be found. More importantly, the comparatively abundant remains from around 4 million years ago may indicate that even Porzana proper had its near-cosmopolitan distribution at that time already. The fossils, sorted by age, are:

- "Porzana" estramosi Jánossy, 1979 (Sajóvölgyi Middle? Miocene – Early Pliocene of Hungary)
- "Porzana" risilla (Middle Miocene or Middle Pliocene of Mongolia)
- Porzana sp. "QM F23253" (Early Pliocene of NE Australia) (Note: May be ancestral to or same as a living species.)
- Porzana sp. "Văršec/Stránská skála" (Late Pliocene of Bulgaria – Early Pleistocene of Czech Republic)
- "Porzana" piercei (Shore Hills Late Pleistocene of Bermuda, W Atlantic)
- Porzana cf. flaviventer (Late Pleistocene -? Holocene of Bermuda, West Atlantic)

The Middle Pleistocene fossil described as Porzana auffenbergi is now placed in Rallus.
