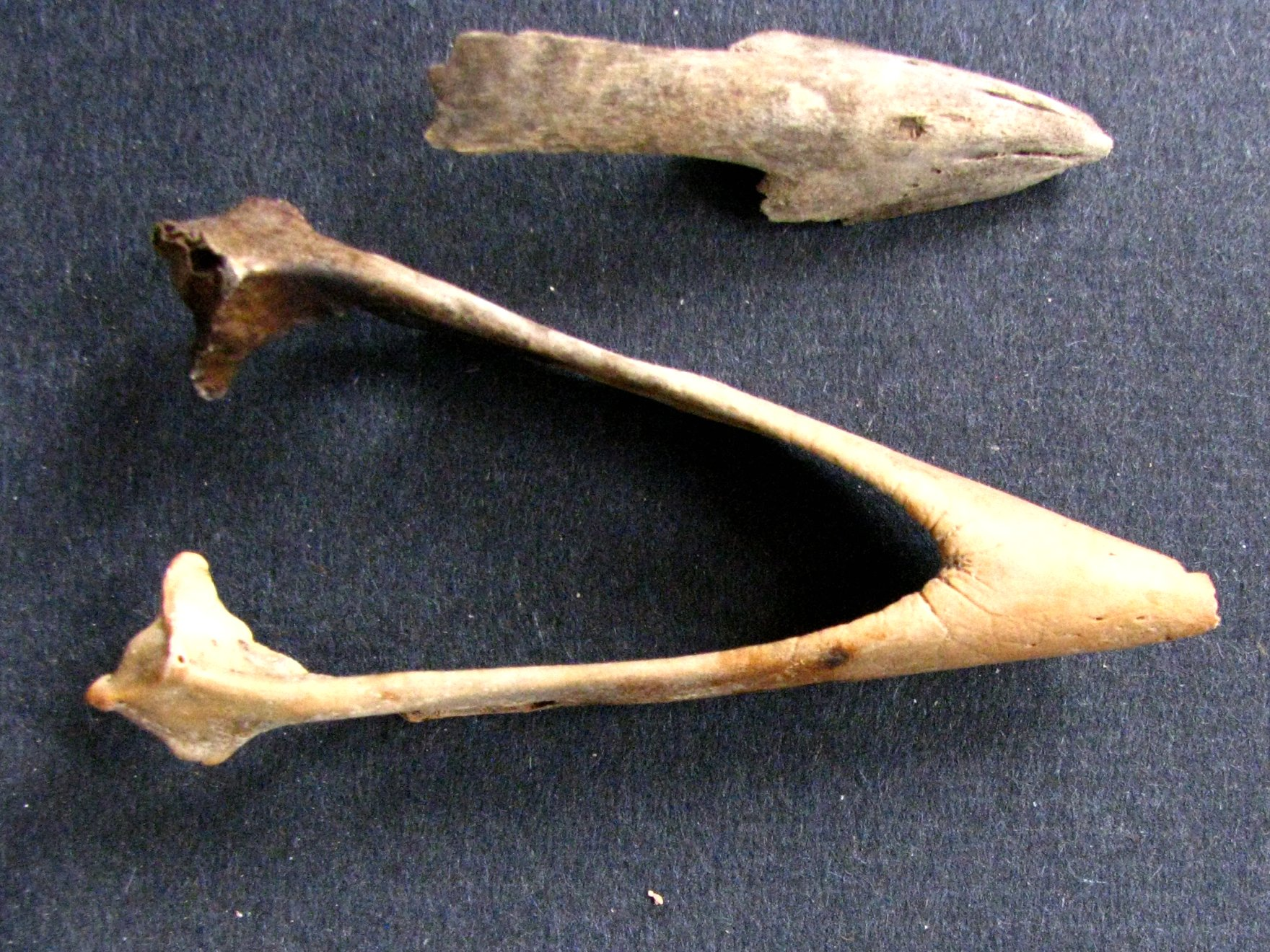
- These fossils represent one or two of the slender-billed crow (Corvus viriosus) and the deep-billed crow (C. impluviatus)

Scientific classification
- Kingdom: Animalia
- Phylum: Chordata
- Class: Aves
- Order: Passeriformes
- Family: Corvidae
- Genus: Corvus
- Species: †C. impluviatus

Binomial name
- †Corvus impluviatus Olson & James, 1991

= High-billed crow =

High-billed crow Temporal range: Holocene

Extinct species of bird

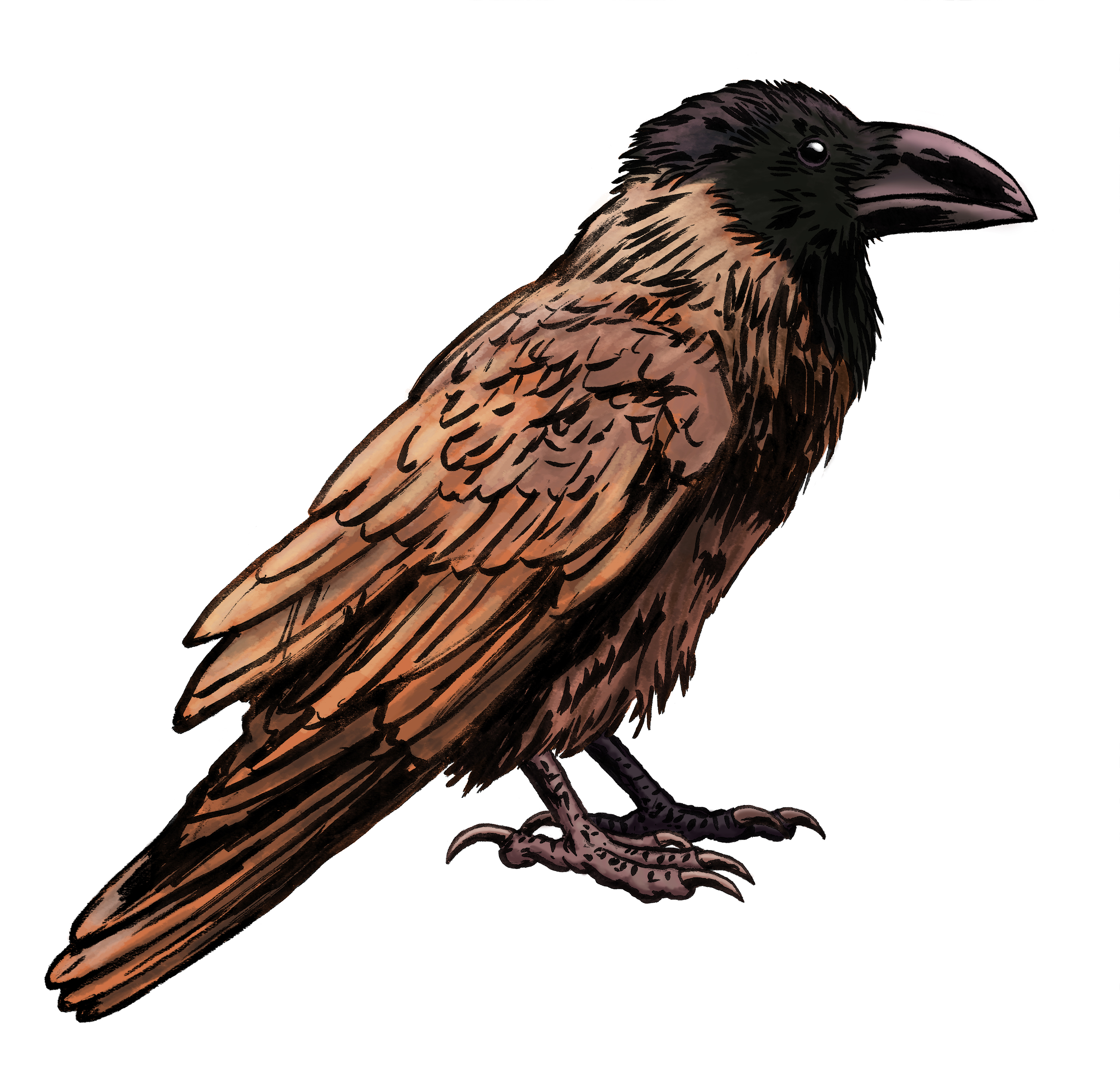
Life restoration

The high-billed crow or deep-billed crow (Corvus impluviatus) is an extinct species of large, raven-sized crow that was endemic to the island of Oahu in the Hawaiian Islands. It was pushed to extinction after the arrival of humans, who brought with them pests like rats.
