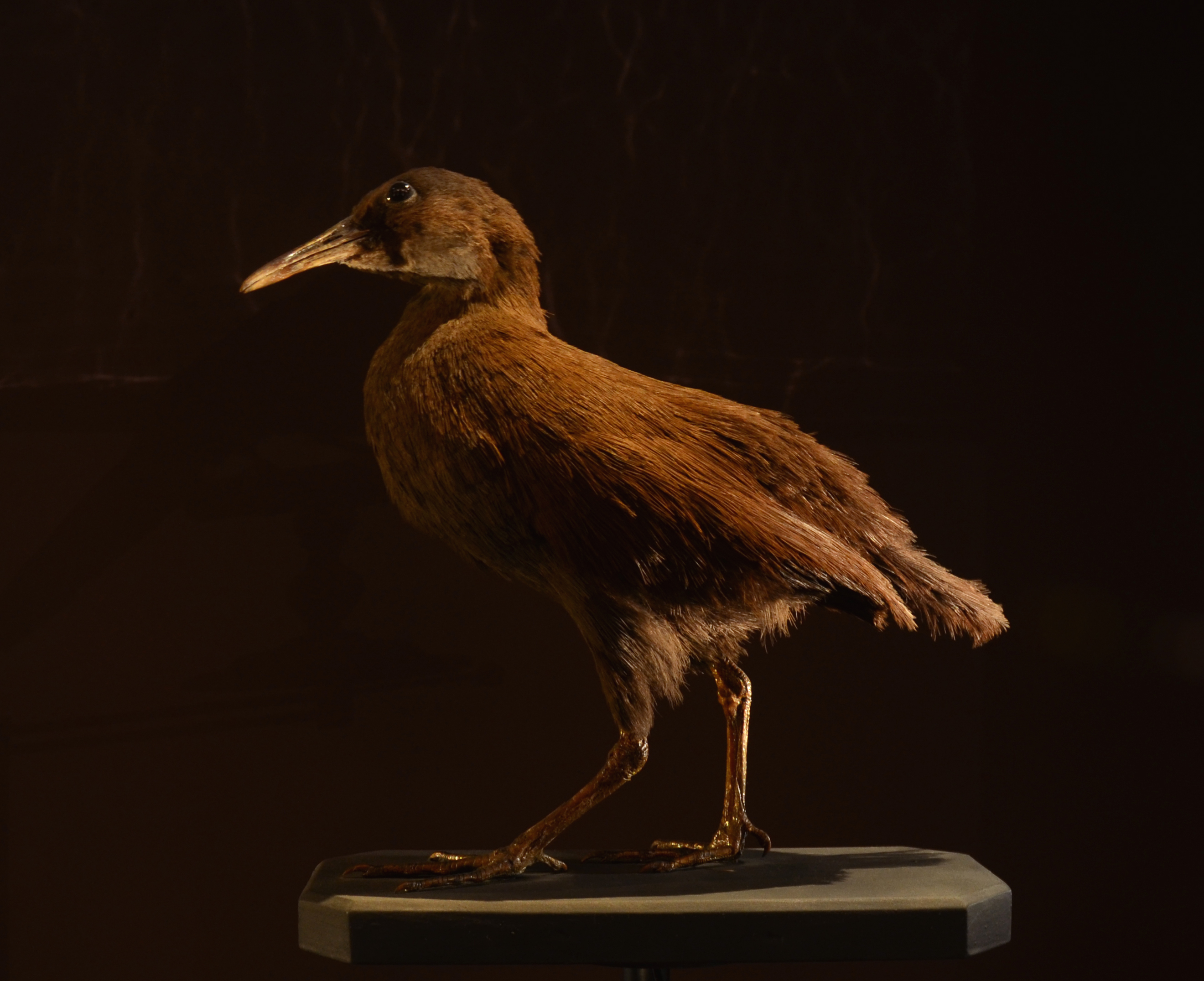
- Stuffed specimen

Conservation status
- Critically Endangered (IUCN 3.1)

Scientific classification
- Kingdom: Animalia
- Phylum: Chordata
- Class: Aves
- Order: Gruiformes
- Family: Rallidae
- Genus: Gallirallus
- Species: G. lafresnayanus

Binomial name
- Gallirallus lafresnayanus Verreaux, J & Des Murs, 1860

Synonyms
- Cabalus lafresnayanus (but see text); Tricholimnas lafresnayanus (but see text)

= New Caledonian rail =

Species of flightless bird

The New Caledonian rail (Gallirallus lafresnayanus) is a large and drab flightless rail endemic to the island of New Caledonia in the Pacific. It is Critically Endangered, may have gone extinct many decades ago already, and if it still exists it is one of the least-known living bird species.

It is a large rail, about 45 cm long, dull brown above, with grey underparts, and has a yellowish, downward-curving bill. The feathers are fluffy and silky, rendering the bird unable to fly; its wings are also reduced (but not as much as in other flightless rails). Due to it having not been seen since the 1890s, its call and daily habits are not known, but it is presumed to be a shy woodland species and possibly active at night, dusk or dawn.

== Taxonomy and evolution ==
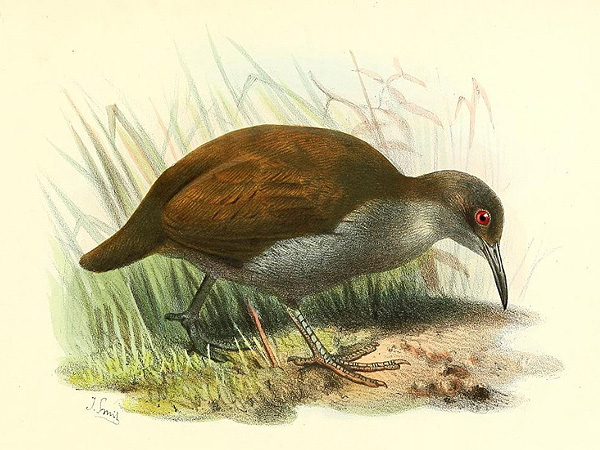
Chromolithograph from 1873

The binomial commemorates the French ornithologist Frederic de Lafresnaye. The New Caledonian rail's relationships have long confounded ornithologists due to the paucity of specimens and the nondescript appearance, the derived flightlessness obscuring anatomical evidence of relationships. Often, it was believed to be closely allied to the Lord Howe woodhen – if only due to them being similarly drab rails from islands across the southern Coral Sea – these two being included in a loosely defined genus Gallirallus, or separated as genus Tricholimnas. Other authors considered Tricholimnas to contain only the present species, arguing that the Lord Howe woodhen, while looking superficially similar, was closer to the smaller species of the Hypotaenidia group among the loosely defined Gallirallus – as was ultimately corroborated by DNA data.

By the mid-2010s, there was general agreement to split up the wastebin taxon Gallirallus, the New Caledonian rail often being included in the reinstated genus Cabalus along with the confirmed-extinct Chatham rail (C. modestus). However, as it turned out since the first early-2010s studies, different types of molecular data tend to strongly disagree about the placement of the Chatham and New Caledonian rails relative to each other and their closest relatives, more so if anatomical data of extinct species are included in the analysis. As far as it has been studied, the New Caledonian rail invariably turns out well distinct and basal to the Hypotaenidia group (including the Lord Howe woodhen); the Chatham rail, however, may actually resolve close to or even in Hypotaenidia depending on which extinct taxa are included in the analyses. Some early mitochondrial DNA data, meanwhile, found the New Caledonian rail close to the weka and conceivably even warranting inclusion in the genus Gallirallus which is otherwise restricted to the weka (and its prehistoric ancestors) today. Adding to the confusion, the Mauritian Red rail is another extinct, roughly weka-sized, flightless and brownish-feathered rail which tends to ally with the species basal to Hypotaenidia, Woodford's rail (formerly in Nesoclopeus) may appear within or outside that genus, while Chestnut rail (Eulabeornis) and Calayan rail (Aptenorallus) are usually but not invariably basal to the entire aforementioned group containing the bulk of the former Gallirallus.

Simplified cladogram demonstrating relationships among tribe Rallini. Genus Rallus and its closest relatives correspond to the red clade, while Hypotaenidia would be the blue clade. The New Caledonian rail is probably part of the paraphyletic evolutionary grade marked green.

Across recent analyses it was noted that the placement of the New Caledonian rail, whatever it might be, was among the less well-supported. What can be said with certainty is that Hypotaenidia is the most advanced radiation of a clade of smallish to largish rails, whose basal evolutionary grade consists of larger species, many being flightless island endemics and often extinct. As well as the "wastebin" Gallirallus, this clade seems to contain the flightless and – apart from Habroptila – extinct island species Invisible rail (Habroptila), Rodrigues rail (Erythromachus), Hawkins's rail (Diaphorapteryx), Snipe-rail (Capellirallus), possibly the Fiji rail (Vitirallus), and maybe even some of the larger species of supposed Porzana crakes of the Hawaiian Islands. Resolving to what extent these species form clades within the basal grade will determine which of the plethora of monotypic genera are actually valid, and whether the New Caledonian rail is indeed correctly placed in Cabalus or would once again go back into Gallirallus or Tricholimnas. In particular Capellirallus is relevant in this regard, since it is small, thin-billed, and from the New Zealand region, like the Chatham rail but quite unlike the large and stout-billed New Caledonian rail.Currently, AviList and Clements include both species in the expanded Gallirallus.

All this nonwithstanding, all evidence suggests that the New Caledonian rail belongs to tribe Rallini of subfamily Rallinae, wherein it is one of the few survivors of the initial radiation. This extended throughout almost the entire Middle to Late Miocene, about 15 to 7 million years ago, and probably started with the descendants of a South to Southeast Asian rail expanding across southeastwards across Wallacea into Melanesia and beyond. Around the time the ancestral Hypotaenidia started to spread northeastwards across Polynesia and into Micronesia, about 5 million years ago, the ancestors of the New Caledonian rail also split off the lineage leading to its closest known ancestor, whether this is the Chatham Rail, the weka, or any other species.

== Ecology and status ==
The bird formerly inhabited forested river valleys but now likely only is present in inaccessible areas.

It is (or was) host to a species of parasite, the phtilopterid louse Rallicola piageti that is not believed to have occurred on any other bird species. Hence, R. piageti may be coextinct.

This cryptic rail is only known from seventeen specimens taken until 1890 on New Caledonia. It is likely threatened from predation by feral cats, dogs, and pigs. Though the bird has not been confirmed since 1890, there was an unsubstantiated sighting in 1984. A survey in 1998 produced no firm evidence from hunters or fieldwork. Occasional local reports suggest it may still be extant, though in small numbers.
