= Vava'u rail =

Vava'u rail Temporal range: Late Pleistocene-Holocene

Scientific classification
- Kingdom: Animalia
- Phylum: Chordata
- Class: Aves
- Order: Gruiformes
- Family: Rallidae
- Genus: Hypotaenidia
- Species: †H. vavauensis

Binomial name
- †Hypotaenidia vavauensis Worthy and Burley, 2020

Species of bird

The Vava'u rail (Hypotaenidia vavauensis) is an extinct species of bird in Rallidae. It was first described in 1793 from an illustration. In 2020 subfossil remains were found on the island of Vuna, in the Vava'u island group of Tonga.

== Description ==
The Vava'u rail was a flightless bird with legs longer and bulkier than most known species in Hypotaenidia. The bill was blood red becoming more of a pale pink towards the lip. The body had patches of grey and white appearing as a slaty blue. It was likely closely related, and visually similar to the ʻEua rail.
