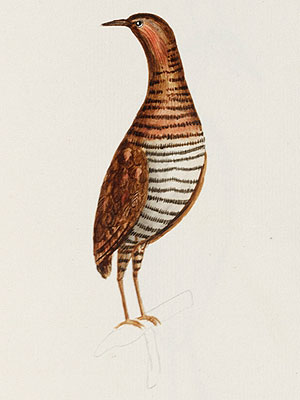
- Depiction from Album of Watercolour Drawings of Australian Natural History, c. 1800 in which it is listed as "ground bird, Norfolk Island"

Scientific classification
- Domain: Eukaryota
- Kingdom: Animalia
- Phylum: Chordata
- Class: Aves
- Order: Gruiformes
- Family: Rallidae
- Genus: Gallirallus
- Species: †Gallirallus sp.

Binomial name
- †Gallirallus sp.
- Map of Norfolk Island, where the rail was said to have lived

= Norfolk Island rail =

Extinct bird species

The Norfolk Island rail (Gallirallus sp.) is an extinct species of bird that lived on Norfolk Island in Australia. It was first identified by an illustration from the Album of Watercolour Drawings of Australian Natural History. It has not been officially described as a species by science.

== Description ==
The Norfolk Island rail is described as a flightless brown rail with a white breast and stripes running down its body. The illustration from the Album of Watercolour Drawings of Australian Natural History is thought to represent this bird. It was noted to be an especially shy bird. It was hunted by falcons and owls, which likely played a part in its extinction. The Norfolk Island rail is thought to have been herbivorous and to wade through water. It likely went extinct around 1800 after the illustration was created, but may have become extinct long before. It is known to have had a small population and was rarely seen.
