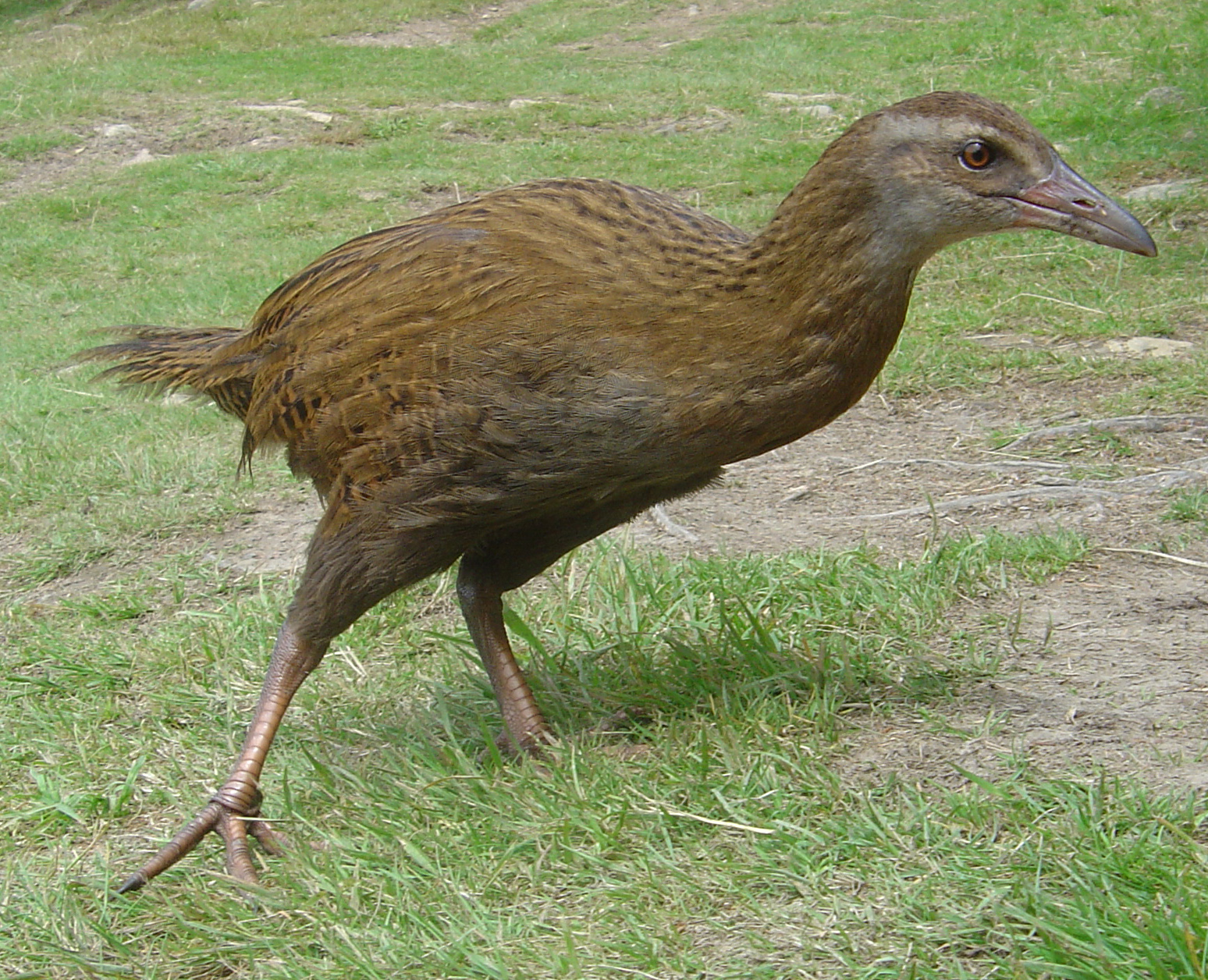
- Weka, Gallirallus australis

Scientific classification
- Kingdom: Animalia
- Phylum: Chordata
- Class: Aves
- Order: Gruiformes
- Family: Rallidae
- Genus: Gallirallus; Lafresnaye, 1841

Type species
- Gallirallus brachypterus Lafresnaye, 1841=Rallus australis Sparman, 1786

Species
- 34, of which 22 are extinct

= Gallirallus =

Genus of birds

Gallirallus is a genus of rails that live in the Australasian-Pacific region. The genus is characterised by an ability to colonise relatively small and isolated islands and thereafter to evolve flightless forms, many of which became extinct following Polynesian settlement.

== Taxonomy ==
The genus Gallirallus was introduced in 1841 by the French ornithologist Frédéric de Lafresnaye to accommodate a single species, Gallirallus brachypterus Lafresnaye. This is the type species. The name is a junior synonym of Rallus australis Sparman, 1786, the weka. The genus name is a portmanteau of the genera Gallus that had been introduced by Mathurin Jacques Brisson in 1760 for the fowl, and the genus Rallus that had been introduced by Carl Linnaeus in 1758 for the rails.

The genus Gallirallus now includes species that were formerly placed in the genera Aptenorallus, Habroptila, Eulabeornis, Cabalus, and Hypotaenidia. Based on genetic analyses that showed relatively shallow branch lengths and sometimes conflicting relationships, the five genera have been subsumed into a broad Gallirallus.

== Description ==
Many of the rails, including the well-known weka of New Zealand, are flightless or nearly so. Many of the resultant flightless island endemics became extinct after the arrival of humans, which hunted these birds for food, introduced novel predators like rats, dogs or pigs, and upset the local ecosystems. A common Polynesian name of these rails, mainly relatives of G. philippensis, is veka/weka (in English, this name is generally limited to Gallirallus australis).

On the other hand, Gallirallus species are (with the exception of the weka) notoriously retiring and shy birds with often drab coloration.

== Species ==
The genus contains 18 species. Of these 6 have become extinct in historical times.

Image	Common name	Scientific name	Distribution
	Calayan rail	Gallirallus calayanensis (formerly in Aptenorallus)	Calayan Island (far northern Philippines)
	Invisible rail	Gallirallus wallacii (formerly in Habroptila)	Halmahera (northern Moluccas)
	Chestnut rail	Gallirallus castaneoventris (formerly in Eulabeornis)	Aru Islands (southwest of New Guinea) and coastal north Australia
	Weka	Gallirallus australis	North Island, South Island, Stewart Island and satellites (New Zealand)
	†New Caledonian rail	Gallirallus lafresnayanus (formerly in Cabalus)	forest of New Caledonia (probably extinct; no definite records since 1890)
	Lord Howe woodhen	Gallirallus sylvestris (formerly in Hypotaenidia)	Lord Howe Island (east of Australia)
	Okinawa rail	Gallirallus okinawae (formerly in Hypotaenidia)	forest and edge from lowlands to hills of northern Okinawa (Ryukyu Islands, southern Japan)
	†Tahiti rail	Gallirallus pacificus (formerly in Hypotaenidia)	formerly Tahiti and adjacent eastern Society Islands; extinct, last reported 1800
	Buff-banded rail	Gallirallus philippensis (formerly in Hypotaenidia)	Philippines to Australia and Pacific islands
	†Chatham rail	Gallirallus modestus (formerly in Cabalus)	formerly Chatham Islands; extinct, last reported 1900
	†Dieffenbach's rail	Gallirallus dieffenbachii (formerly in Hypotaenidia)	formerly Chatham Islands; extinct, last reported 1900
	Pink-legged rail	Gallirallus insignis (formerly in Hypotaenidia)	forest of New Britain (southeastern Bismarck Archipelago)
	Woodford's rail	Gallirallus woodfordi (formerly in Hypotaenidia)	Solomon Islands
	†Bar-winged rail	Gallirallus poecilopterus (formerly in Eulabeornis)	formerly Viti Levu and Ovalau, Fiji (western Polynesia); extinct, last reported 1973
	Guam rail	Gallirallus owstoni (formerly in Hypotaenidia)	forest of Guam (southern Mariana Islands); extinct in the wild until successfully reintroduced into Rota (southernmost Northern Mariana Islands) and Cocos Islands (just south of Guam)
	†Wake Island rail	Gallirallus wakensis (formerly in Hypotaenidia)	formerly Wake Island; extinct, last reported 1944
	Barred rail	Gallirallus torquatus (formerly in Hypotaenidia)	Philippines, islets off Sabah (Malaysia), Sulawesi and satellites and west New Guinea
	Roviana rail	Gallirallus rovianae (formerly in Hypotaenidia)	New Georgia islands (west-central Solomon Islands)

== Species extinct before A.D. 1500 ==
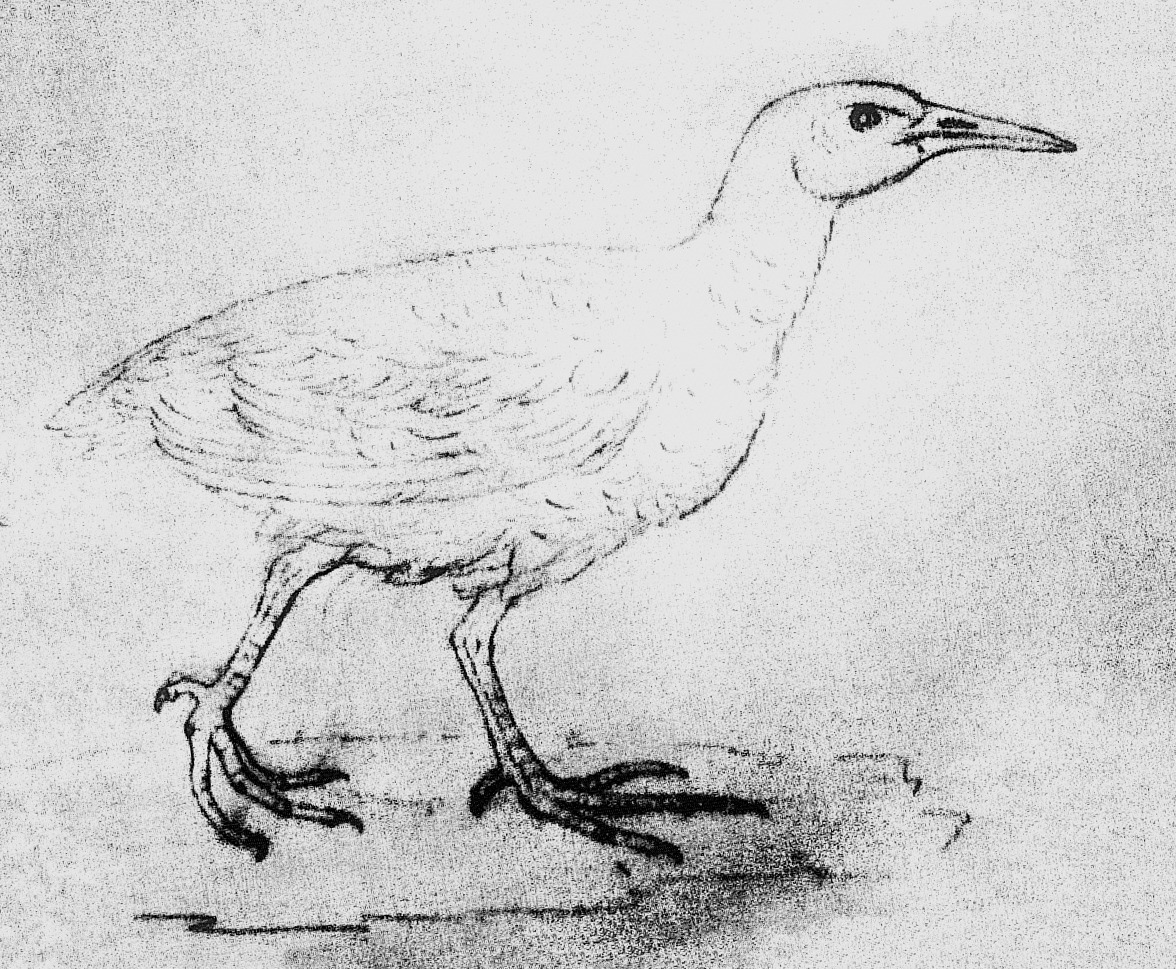
Illustration of an unidentified extinct species (possibly G. vekamatolu) from Vava'u, 1793

Given recent taxonomic proposals that the weka is the only extant Gallirallus species, it is possible these may also belong to different genera, but are presently retained in Gallirallus due to uncertainty.

- Astolfo's rail, Gallirallus astolfoi
- Nuku Hiva rail, Gallirallus epulare
- New Ireland rail, Gallirallus ernstmayri
- Ua Huka rail, Gallirallus gracilitibia
- Niue rail, Gallirallus huiatua
- Tinian rail, Gallirallus pendiculentus
- Aguijan rail, Gallirallus pisonii
- Mangaia rail, Gallirallus ripleyi
- Tahuata rail, Gallirallus roletti
- Tubuai rail, Gallirallus steadmani
- Huahine rail, Gallirallus storrsolsoni
- Rota rail, Gallirallus temptatus
- ʻEua rail, Gallirallus vekamatolu – possibly survived to the early 19th century
- Hiva Oa rail, ?Gallirallus sp.
- Norfolk Island rail, Gallirallus sp. - possibly survived to the early 19th century
- Vava'u rail, Gallirallus [Hypotaenidia] vavauensis
