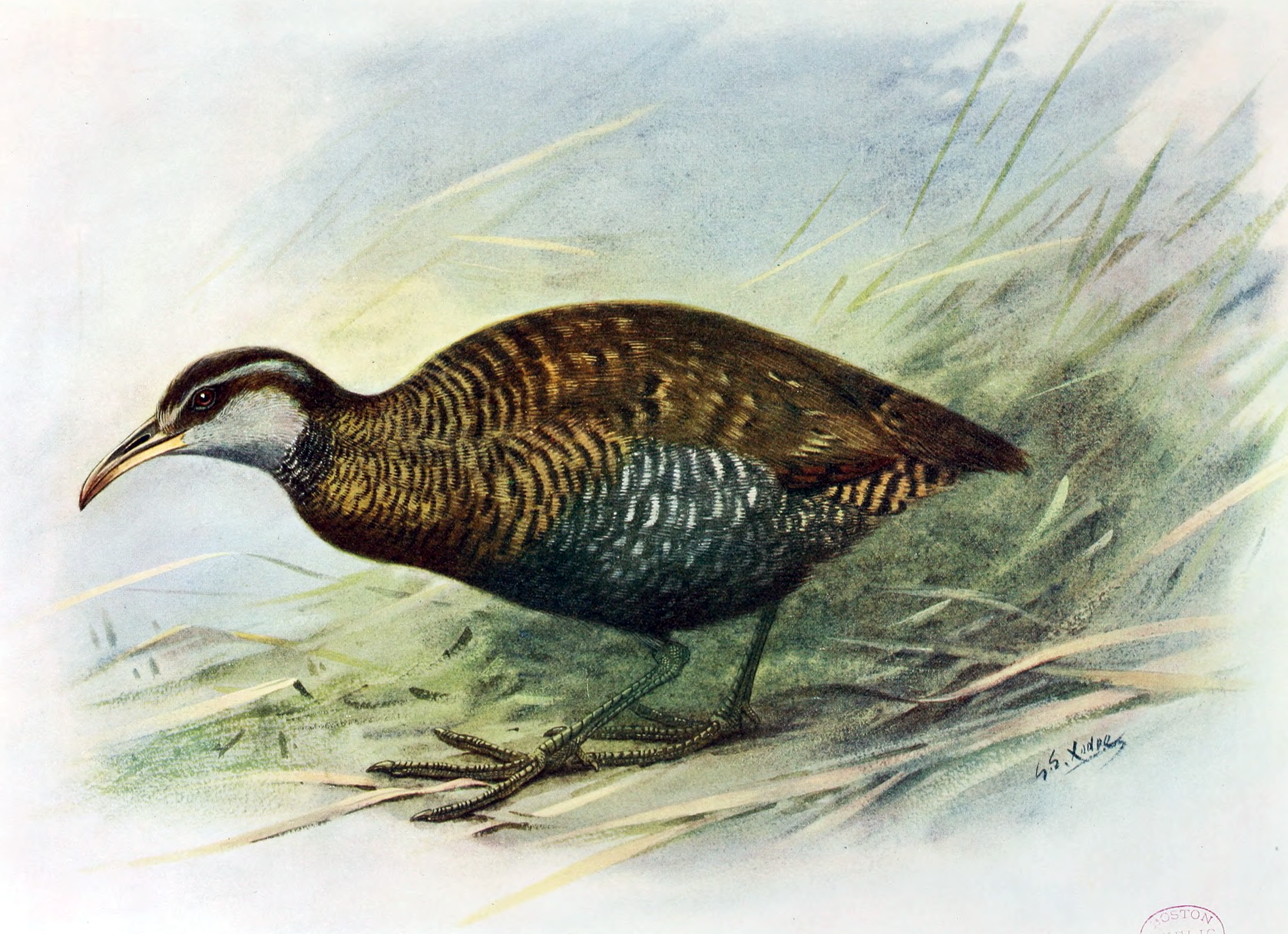

Conservation status
- Extinct (1872) (IUCN 3.1)

- Extinct (1872) (NZ TCS)

Scientific classification
- Kingdom: Animalia
- Phylum: Chordata
- Class: Aves
- Order: Gruiformes
- Family: Rallidae
- Genus: Gallirallus
- Species: †G. dieffenbachii

Binomial name
- †Gallirallus dieffenbachii (Gray, 1843)

Synonyms
- Hypotaenidia dieffenbachii; Cabalus dieffenbachii

= Dieffenbach's rail =

Extinct species of bird

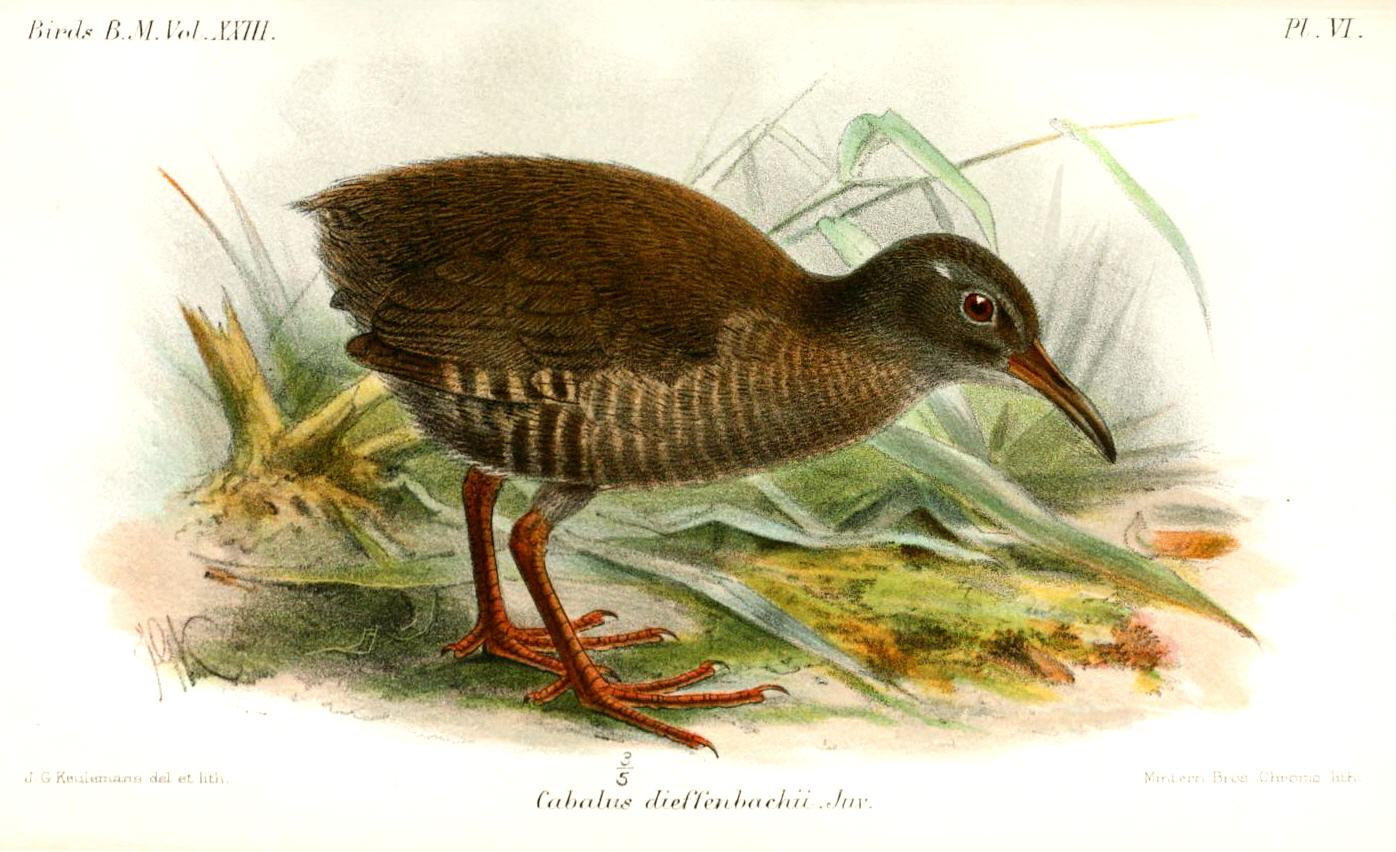
Juvenile

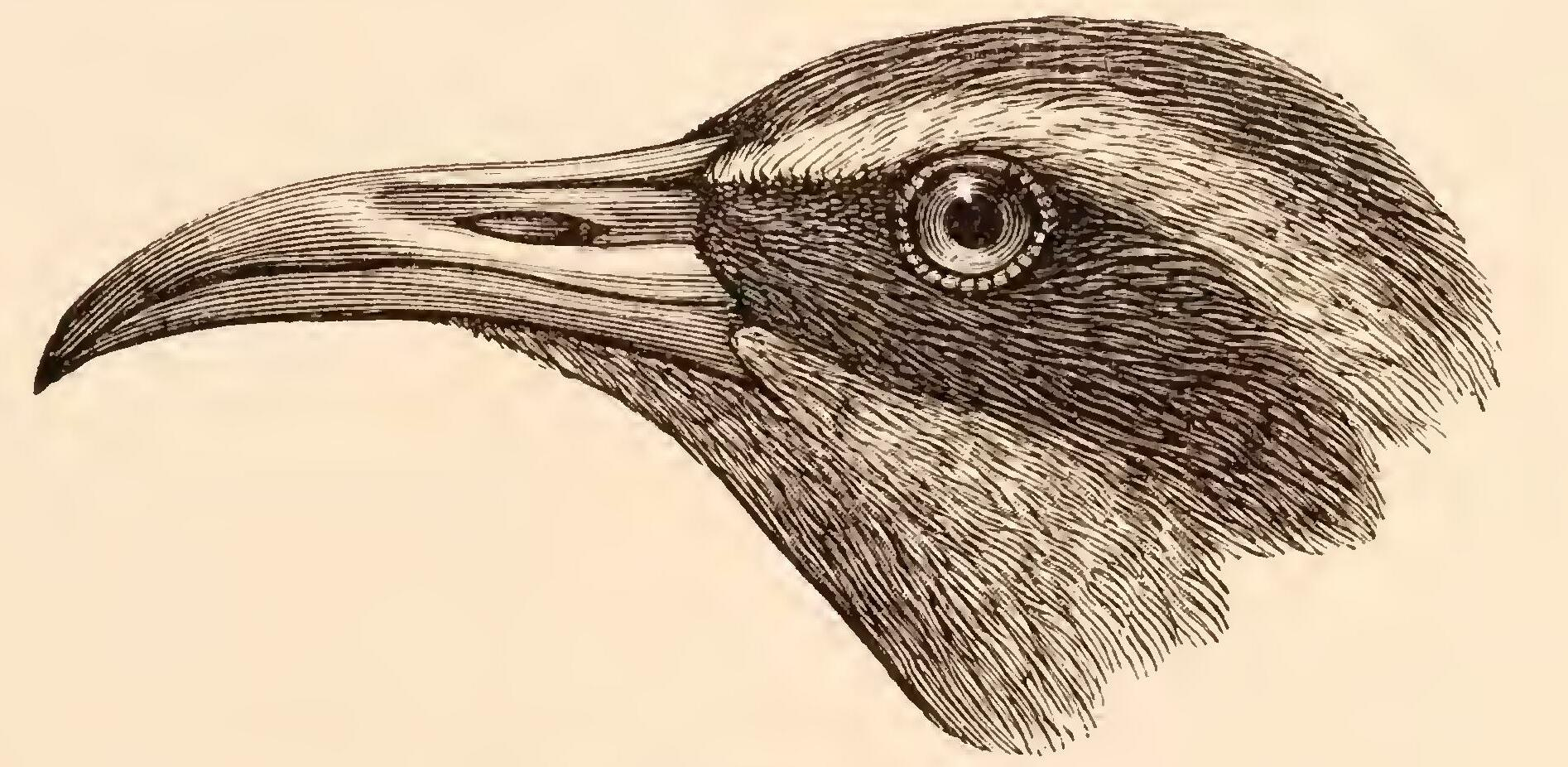
Head

Dieffenbach's rail (Gallirallus dieffenbachii), known in the Moriori language as meriki or mehoriki, is an extinct flightless bird in the rail family. It was endemic to the Chatham Islands. The species was formerly placed in the genus Hypotaenidia.

== Extinction ==
The type specimen specimen of Dieffenbach's rail was captured in 1840 by Ernst Dieffenbach, who is commemorated in the scientific and common name of the species. It became extinct due to hunting and introduced predators, as well as habitat loss by 1872.

== Taxonomy ==
The Dieffenbach's rail was sympatric with the flightless Chatham rail (Cabalus modestus). Their sympatry suggests parallel evolution after separate colonisation of the Chatham Islands by a common volant ancestor, presumably the buff-banded rail (Hypotaenidia philippensis). A 2014 genetic analysis found that the taxa were not particularly closely related, with Dieffenbach's rail being sister to the group of Hypotaenidia including the buff-banded rail, while the Chatham rail was found to be in a more basal position. It is still considered to be in the genus Gallirallus by some experts.

== Gallery ==
Various views of the skull of Dieffenbach's rail

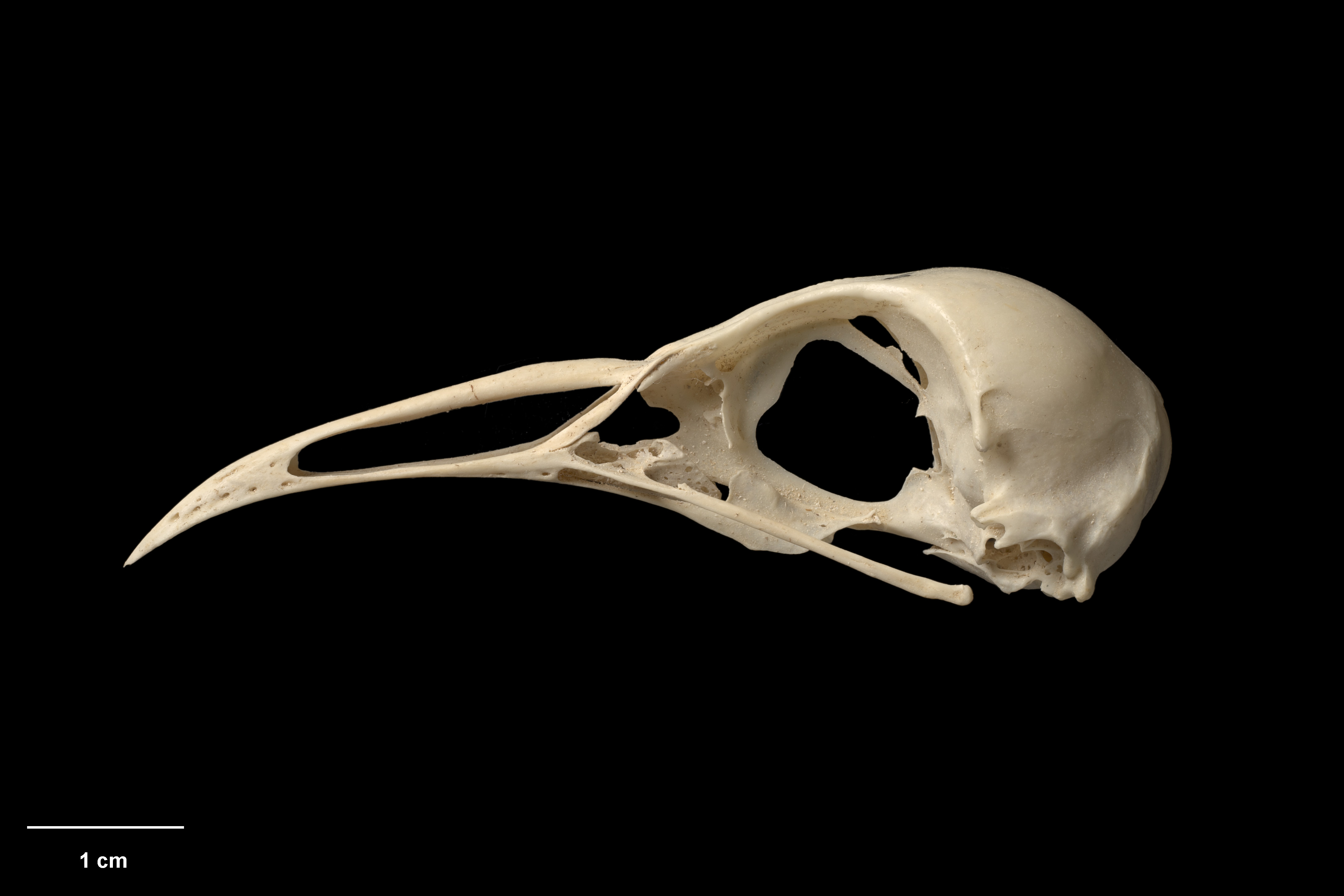
Lateral view

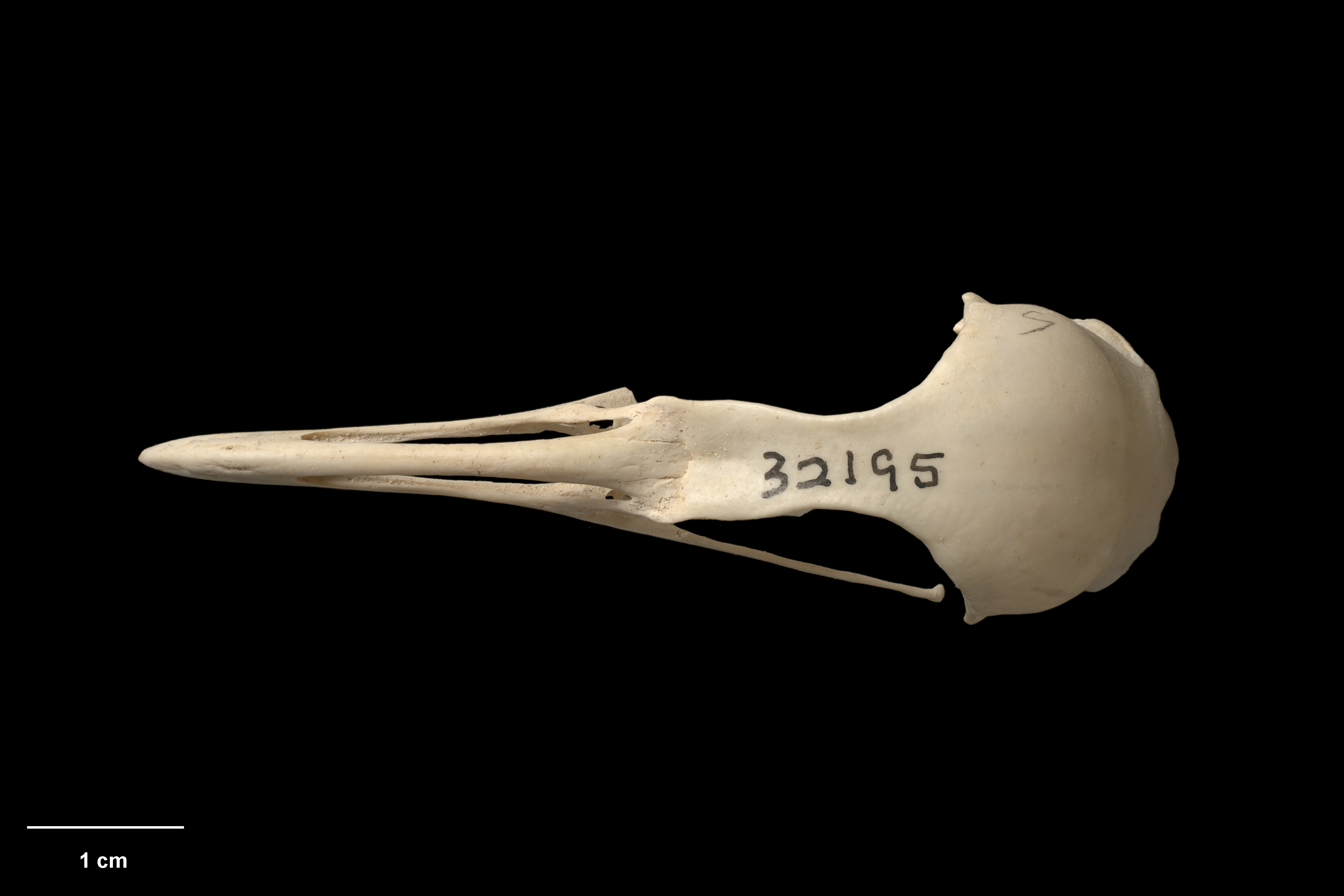
Dorsal view

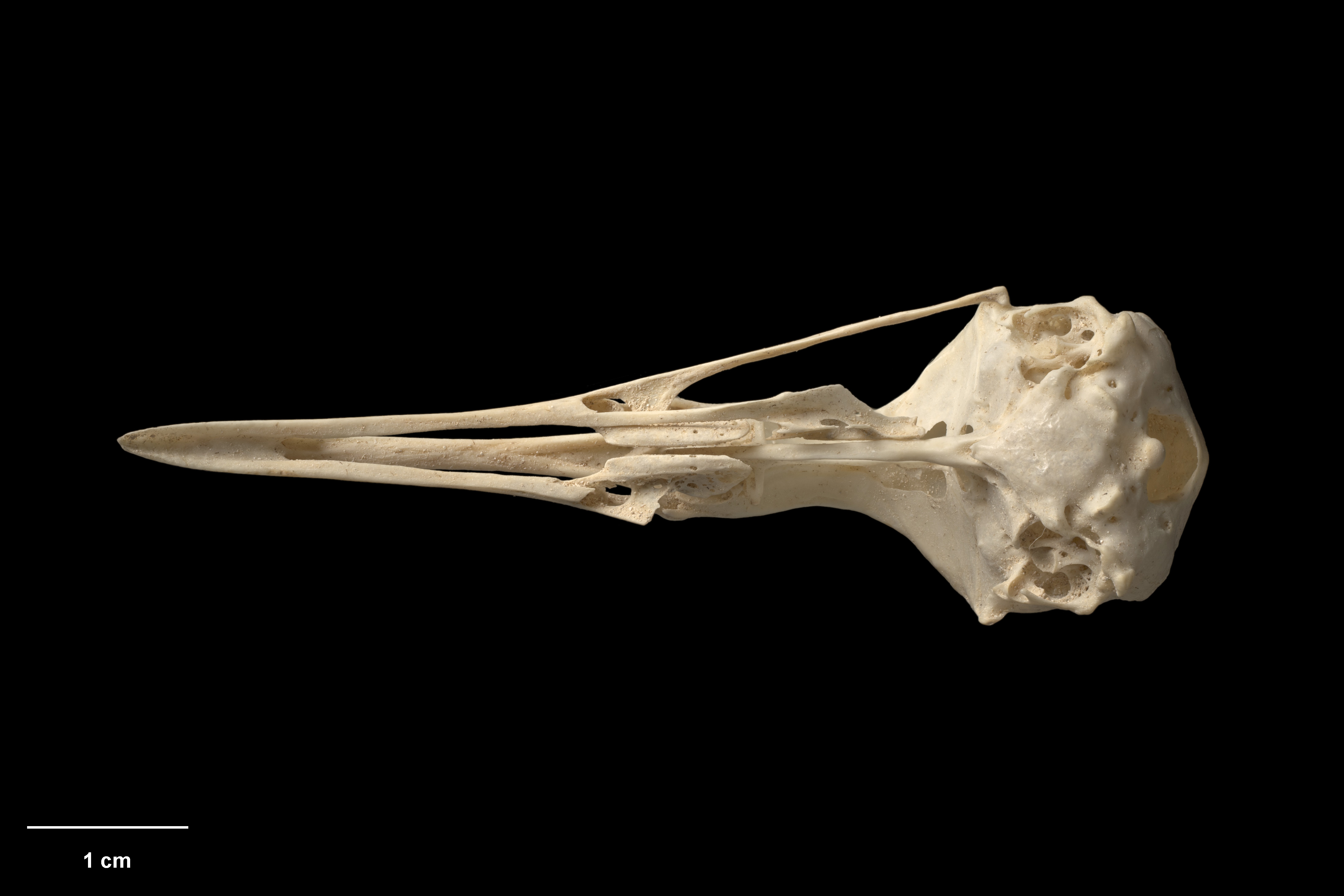
Ventral view

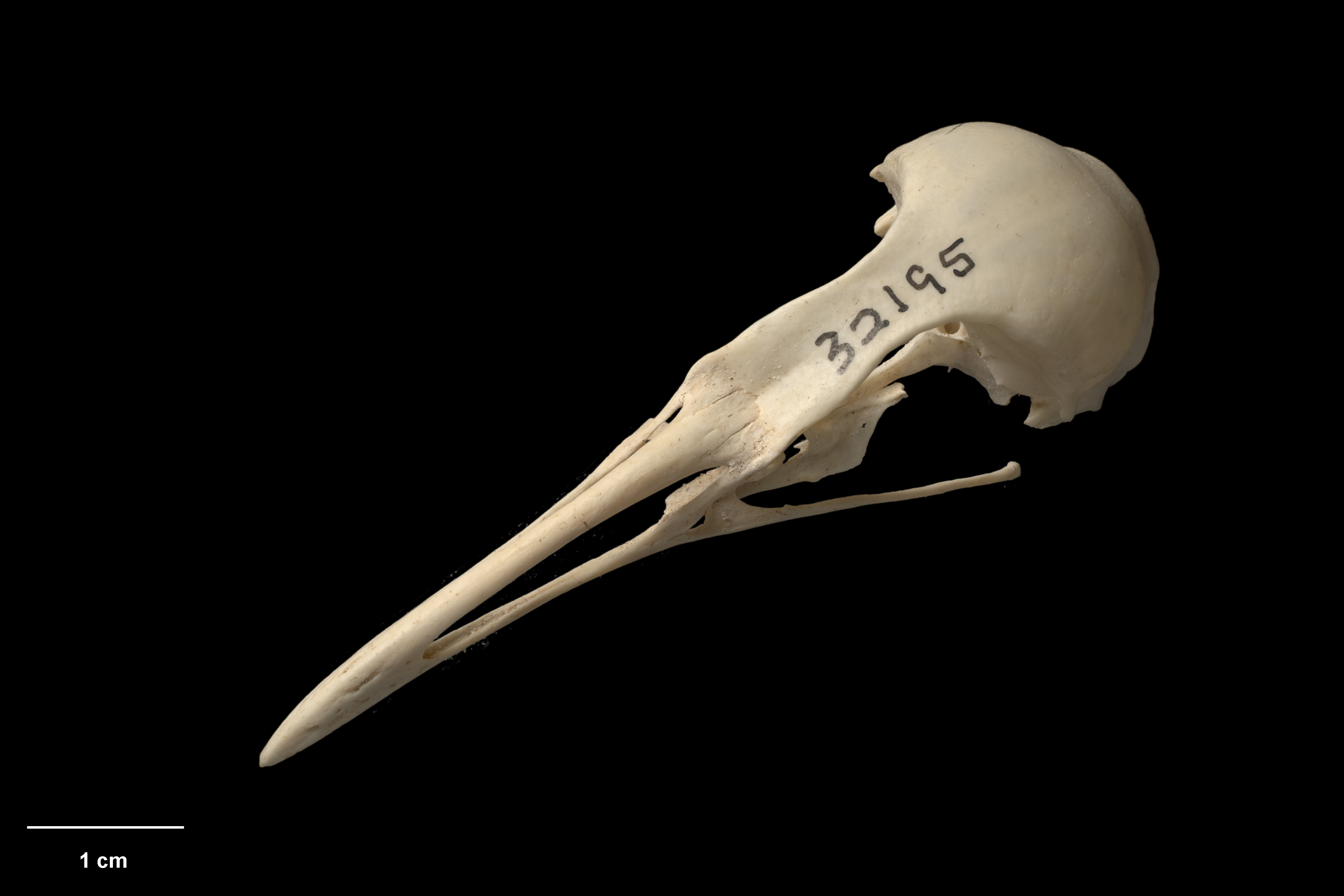
Oblique view

== See also ==
- Hawkins's rail, another extinct flightless rail endemic to the Chatham Islands.
