= Ernst Dieffenbach =

German physician, geologist and naturalist (1811–1855)

Johann Karl Ernst Dieffenbach
- Born: 27 January 1811; Giessen, Hesse, Germany
- Died: 1 October 1855 (aged 44); Giessen, Germany
- Other name: Ernest Dieffenbach
- Education: University of Giessen, University of Zurich
- Known for: Travels in New Zealand
- Scientific career
- Fields: Physician, geologist, naturalist
- Institutions: University of Giessen
- Author abbrev. (zoology): Dieffenbach

Johann Karl Ernst Dieffenbach (27 January 1811 – 1 October 1855), also known as Ernest Dieffenbach, was a German medical doctor, geologist and naturalist, the first trained scientist to live and work in New Zealand, where he travelled widely under the auspices of the New Zealand Company, returning in 1841–42 and publishing in English his Travels in New Zealand in 1843.

Dieffenbach was born in Giessen. He gained a degree at the University of Giessen and then, accused by authorities in the Grand Duchy of Hesse of being subversive, he fled, first to Zurich, where he received a degree in medicine before being expelled in 1836 for politics and duelling; in 1837 he arrived in London, where he eked out a living teaching German, but gained a reputation by his contributions to medical and scientific journals and made friendships with geologists Charles Lyell and Richard Owen among others. Recommendations put him aboard the Tory bound for New Zealand, travelling in the capacity of surgeon, surveyor and naturalist.

During the 1840s he was a correspondent of Charles Darwin, whose Journal of Researches Dieffenbach translated into German and published, with Darwin's notes and corrections, as Naturwissenschaftliche Reisen (Brunswick, 1853). Darwin knew Dieffenbach's paper on the Chatham Islands, contributed to the journal of the Royal Geographical Society, and he particularly noted Dieffenbach's commentary on the differences between the species of birds there and in New Zealand. Dieffenbach also translated the Geological Manual of Henry De la Beche. Partly as a result of these efforts, in 1850 he was named adjunct professor of geology at Giessen, a post he held until his death there.

The extinct Dieffenbach's rail (Gallirallus dieffenbachii) a flightless rail formerly endemic to the Chatham Islands, was named after him. (The plant genus Dieffenbachia was named after the head gardener of the Botanical Gardens in Vienna, Joseph Dieffenbach (1796–1863).

== Travels in New Zealand ==
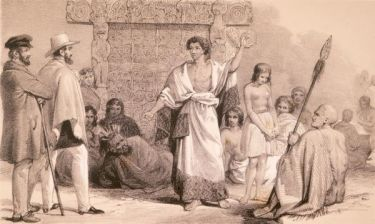
Allegory to Ernst Dieffenbach reaching the summit of Mount Egmont (New Zealand)

Ernst Dieffenbach was one of the first Europeans to visit the Rotomahana area in New Zealand. He visited Rotomahana and the Pink and White Terraces while on a mission for the New Zealand Company. Dieffenbach and his assistant Symonds travelled from New Plymouth via Mount Egmont (Taranaki) and Ruapehu and then around the shores of Lake Taupō. They then travelled north, partly following the Waikato River then east towards Kakaramea (Rainbow Mountain), reaching Rotomahana Lake late one evening. They camped overnight at the mouth of the Haumi Stream.

He inspired wider interest in the Pink and White Terraces with his publications. When he had completed his short stay at Rotomahana, they continued north via Lake Tarawera and the Te Ngae Mission Station to Rotorua. Dieffenbach was employed by the New Zealand Company for this excursion, and also traveled extensively throughout the North Island, making notes on flora and fauna, which can be seen in his biography at the Alexander Turnbull Library.

When Dieffenbach completed his employment by the New Zealand Company he was forced to leave the country. His studies in the North Island were completed after he left New Zealand. When he attempted to re-enter New Zealand to continue his studies in the South Island he was refused entry.
