= Ua Huka rail =

Ua Huka rail Temporal range: Late Holocene

Conservation status
- Extinct

Scientific classification
- Kingdom: Animalia
- Phylum: Chordata
- Class: Aves
- Order: Gruiformes
- Family: Rallidae
- Genus: Gallirallus
- Species: †G. gracilitibia

Binomial name
- †Gallirallus gracilitibia Kirchman & Steadman, 2007

Extinct species of bird

The Ua Huka rail (Gallirallus gracilitibia) is an extinct species of flightless bird in the Rallidae, or rail family.

== History ==
It was described in 2007 from subfossil remains collected in 1965 by anthropologist Yosihiko H. Sinoto and colleagues at the Hane Dune archaeological site, on the island of Ua Huka in the Marquesas Islands of French Polynesia. The site dates to about 1350 yr BP, from the early period of human settlement of the island.

== Etymology ==
The specific epithet comes from the Latin gracilis (slender) and tibia (shinbone), referring to a diagnostic character of the material from which the species was described.

== Description ==
The Ua Huka rail was a small to medium-sized rail, similar to the buff-banded rail (Hypotaenidia philippensis) but with reduced wings and an extremely thin shaft of the tibiotarsus - perhaps the thinnest among all rail species, volant or flightless. The reasons behind this feature are unclear.
