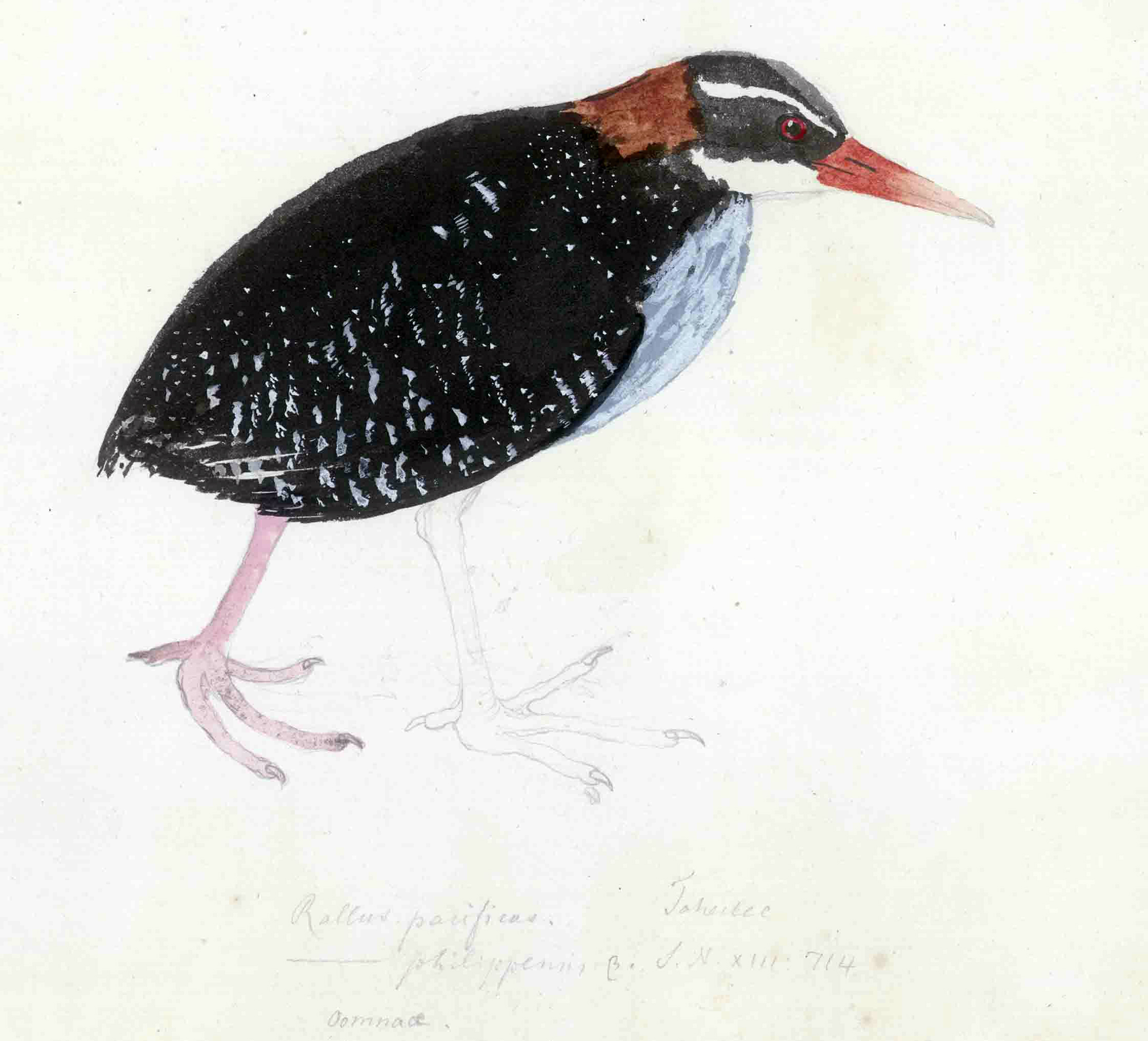
- Early 1770s illustration by Georg Forster

Conservation status
- Extinct (ca 1930s) (IUCN 3.1)

Scientific classification
- Kingdom: Animalia
- Phylum: Chordata
- Class: Aves
- Order: Gruiformes
- Family: Rallidae
- Genus: Gallirallus
- Species: †G. pacificus

Binomial name
- †Gallirallus pacificus (Gmelin, JF, 1789)
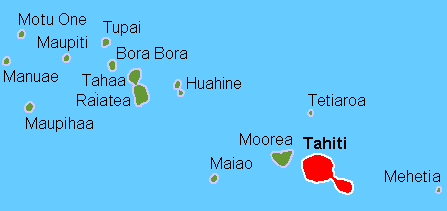
- Location of Tahiti (red) and Mehetia (lower right), among the Society Islands

Synonyms
- Rallus pacificus Gmelin, JF, 1789; Hypotaenidia pacifica

= Tahiti rail =

Extinct species of bird from Tahiti

The Tahiti rail, Tahitian red-billed rail, or Pacific red-billed rail (Gallirallus pacificus) is an extinct species of rail that lived on Tahiti. It was first recorded during James Cook's second voyage around the world (1772–1775), on which it was illustrated by Georg Forster and described by Johann Reinhold Forster. No specimens have been preserved. As well as the documentation by the Forsters, there have been claims that the bird also existed on the nearby island of Mehetia. The Tahiti rail appears to have been closely related to, and perhaps derived from, the buff-banded rail, and has also been historically confused with the Tongan subspecies of that bird.

The Tahiti rail was 9 inches (23 centimetres) long, and its colouration was unusual for a rail. The underparts, throat, and eyebrow-like supercilium were white, and the upper parts were black with white dots and bands. The nape (or hind neck) was ferruginous (rust-coloured), the breast was grey, and it had a black band across the lower throat. The bill and iris were red, and the legs were fleshy pink. The Tahiti rail was supposedly flightless and nested on the ground. It is said to have been seen in open areas, marshes, and in coconut plantations. Its diet appears to have consisted mainly of insects and occasionally copra (coconut meat). The extinction of the Tahiti rail was probably due to predation by humans and introduced cats and rats. It appears to have become extinct some time after 1844 on Tahiti, and perhaps as late as the 1930s on Mehetia.

== Taxonomy ==
The Tahiti rail was found on the South Pacific island of Tahiti (part of the Society Islands archipelago) by naturalists who were part of the British explorer James Cook's second voyage around the world (1772–1775). The bird was illustrated by Georg Forster, who accompanied his father, the German naturalist Johann Reinhold Forster. The father and son were tasked with recording natural history during the voyage, with Georg as the draughtsman. The plate (no. 128) is life-sized and is kept at the Natural History Museum in London. It is inscribed with the words "Rallus pacificus. Taheitee. Oomnaoe. Oomeea keto ōw'". No specimens of this bird have been preserved, but it is presumed that Forster saw a skin. The English naturalist John Latham referred to this species as the "Pacific Rail" in 1785, and the German naturalist Johann Friedrich Gmelin formally named the bird Rallus pacificus in 1789, based on Latham's account. In 1844 the German naturalist Hinrich Lichtenstein published J. R. Forster's account of the discoveries made during the journey, including his description of the Tahiti rail.

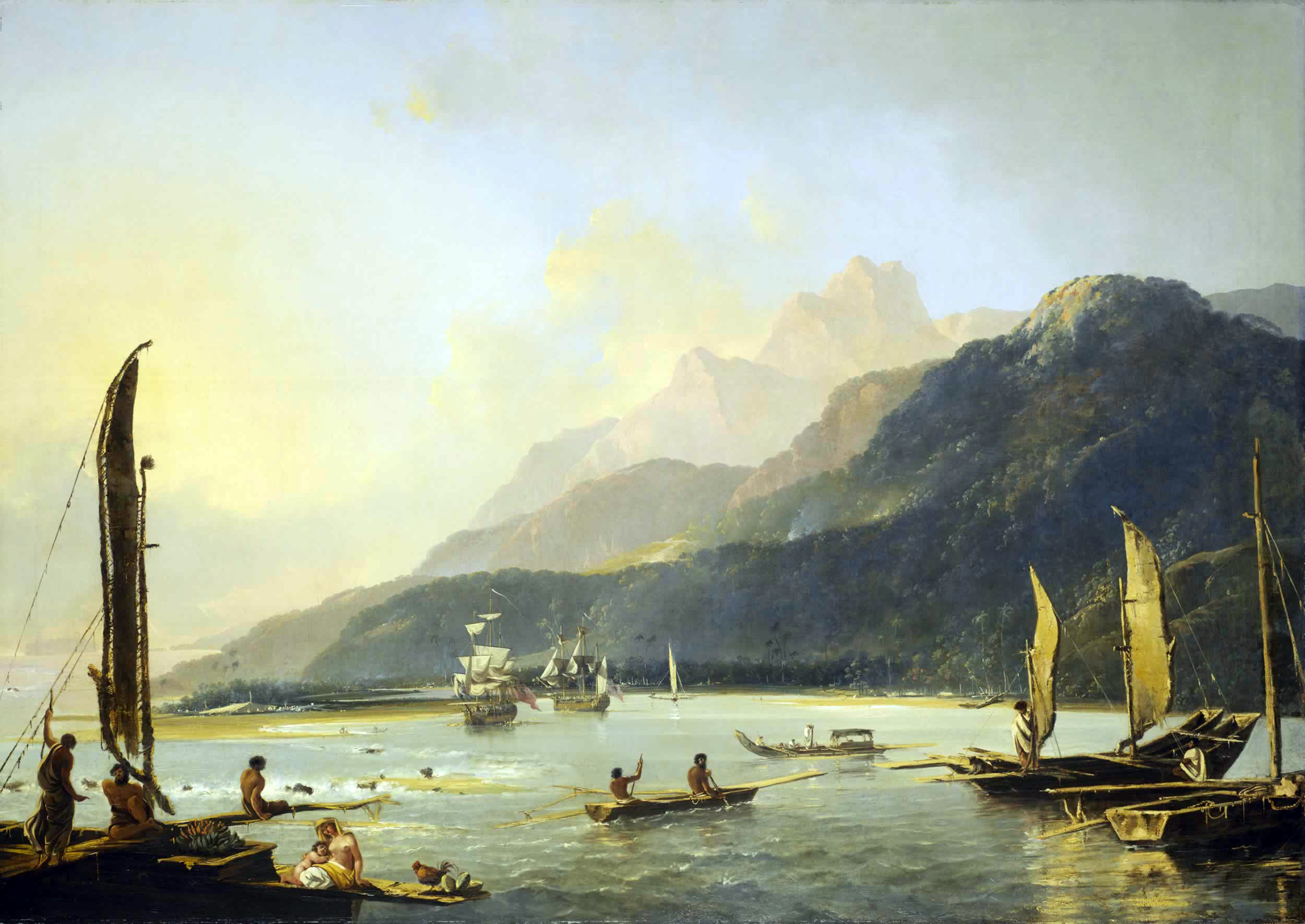
James Cook's ships off Tahiti during his second voyage when this rail was found, William Hodges, 1776

J. R. Forster indicated that the Tahiti rail was called Oomnaa or Eboonàa on Tahiti and neighbouring islands, and Oomèia-Keteòw on Tonga, though he specified only Tahiti and nearby islands as being part of its range. Tevea also appears to have been one of the common names for the bird. In 1967 the American ornithologist James Greenway wrote that the bird was said by Polynesians to have also existed on the island of Mehetia near Tahiti "a generation ago", as reported to Greenway by the amateur naturalist Anthony Curtiss. Greenway also suggested it may have occurred on other islands. In 1972 the ornithologist Phillip L. Bruner stated the bird was last recorded on Mehetia about fifty years earlier. In 2012 the English ornithologist and artist Julian P. Hume referred to the claim that the bird lived on Mehetia as "hearsay" but regarded it as a possibility that it lived there and on other outlying islands. In 2001 the English writer Errol Fuller stated that unlike some other "hypothetical extinct species" only known from old accounts, the Tahiti rail was sufficiently well documented for there to be no doubt that it existed.

The Tahiti rail has historically been confused with the extant Tongan subspecies of the buff-banded rail, Gallirallus philippensis ecaudata, which was also illustrated and described by the Forsters. In his 1783 description of the Tongan bird (wherein it was named Rallus eucaudata), the English ornithologist John Frederick Miller erroneously gave its locality as Tahiti, which led the Tahiti rail to be regarded as a junior synonym of the extant bird. He based his description on Forster's illustration (plate no. 127) of the Tongan bird, and Latham and Gmelin later repeated Miller's erroneous locality. The 1844 publication of Forster's description listed the Tongan bird as a variety of the Tahitian species, and similar schemes were suggested by later writers until 1953, when the New Zealand biologist Averil Margaret Lysaght pointed out Miller's locality mistake, which had been overlooked until that point, and kept the two birds separate. In spite of the clarification, the Tongan bird was placed on a list of extinct birds in the 1981 book Endangered Birds of the World, and Forster's plate of the Tahiti rail was used to illustrate the Samoan wood rail (Gallinula pacifica), a completely different species, in the 1989 book Le Grand Livre des Espécies Disparues.

Along with the buff-banded rail and close relatives, the Tahiti rail has historically been placed in either the genus Hypotaenidia (as H. pacifica) or Gallirallus (as G. pacificus), and is currently classified in the latter. The specific name refers to the Pacific Ocean and is Latin for "peaceful". In 1977 the American ornithologist Sidney Dillon Ripley suggested that the Tahiti rail was an isolated form of buff-banded rail and perhaps belonged to a superspecies with that bird and the Wake Island rail (Gallirallus wakensis). Rails are some of the most widespread terrestrial vertebrates, and have colonised practically all island groups, with many island species being flightless. In 1973 the American ornithologist Storrs L. Olson argued that many insular flightless species of rails were descended from still extant flighted rails, that flightlessness had evolved independently and rapidly in many different island species, and that this feature is therefore of no taxonomic importance. Flightlessness can be advantageous (especially where food is scarce) because it conserves energy by decreasing the mass of flight muscles; the absence of predators (particularly mammalian) and a reduced need for dispersal are factors that allow this feature to develop in island birds.

== Description ==
J. R. Forster stated the Tahiti rail was 9 inches (23 cm) long, which is small for a member of its genus. Its colouration was also striking and unusual for a rail and it was described as being an attractive bird. The upper parts were black with white dots and bands (also referred to as spots and bars), and the underparts, throat, and eyebrow-like supercilium were white. The nape (or hind neck) was ferruginous (rust-coloured), the breast was grey, and it had a black band across the lower throat. The bill and iris were red, and the legs were fleshy pink. The sexes were presumably similar, and the immature and juvenile were not described.

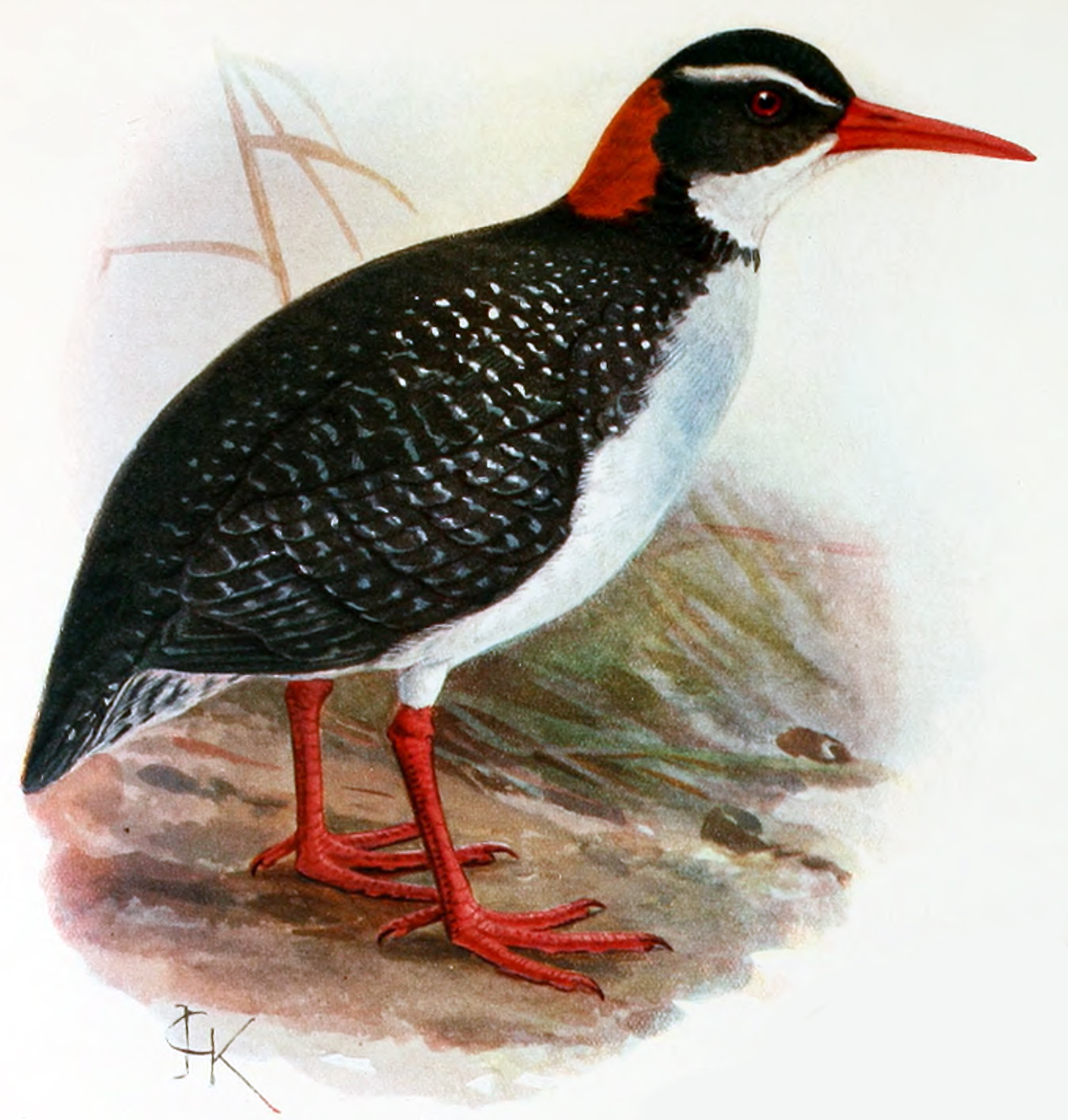
1907 illustration by John Gerrard Keulemans, based on Forster's plate; the legs are depicted too brightly red.

Forster's original description of the bird follows below, in a translation from Latin published by the English naturalist Walter Rothschild in 1907:

Black with white spots or bars; abdomen, throat, and eyebrow white; hind neck ferruginous; breast grey; bill blood-red; iris red. Bill straight, compressed, narrowed at the top, thicker at the base, and blood-red. The mandibles subequal, pointed; the upper slightly curved, with the tip pale fuscous; gape medium. Nostrils almost at the base of bill, linear. Eyes placed above the gape of the mouth. Iris blood-red. Feet four-toed, split, built for running, flesh-coloured. Femora semi-bare, slender, of medium length. Tibiae slightly compressed, shorter than the femora. Four toes, slender, of which three point forward (are front toes). The middle one almost as long as the Tibia, the side ones of equal length shorter, the back one short, raised from the ground. Nails short, small, slightly incurved, pointed, and light coloured. Head oval, slightly depressed, fuscous. A superciliary line from bill to occiput whitish. Throat white. Hindneck ferruginous. Neck very short. Back and rump black, sparsely dotted with minute white dots. Breast bluish grey. Abdomen, crissum, and loins white. Wings short, wholly black, variegated with broken white bands. Remiges short. Rectrices extremely short, black spotted with white, hardly to be distinguished from the coverts.

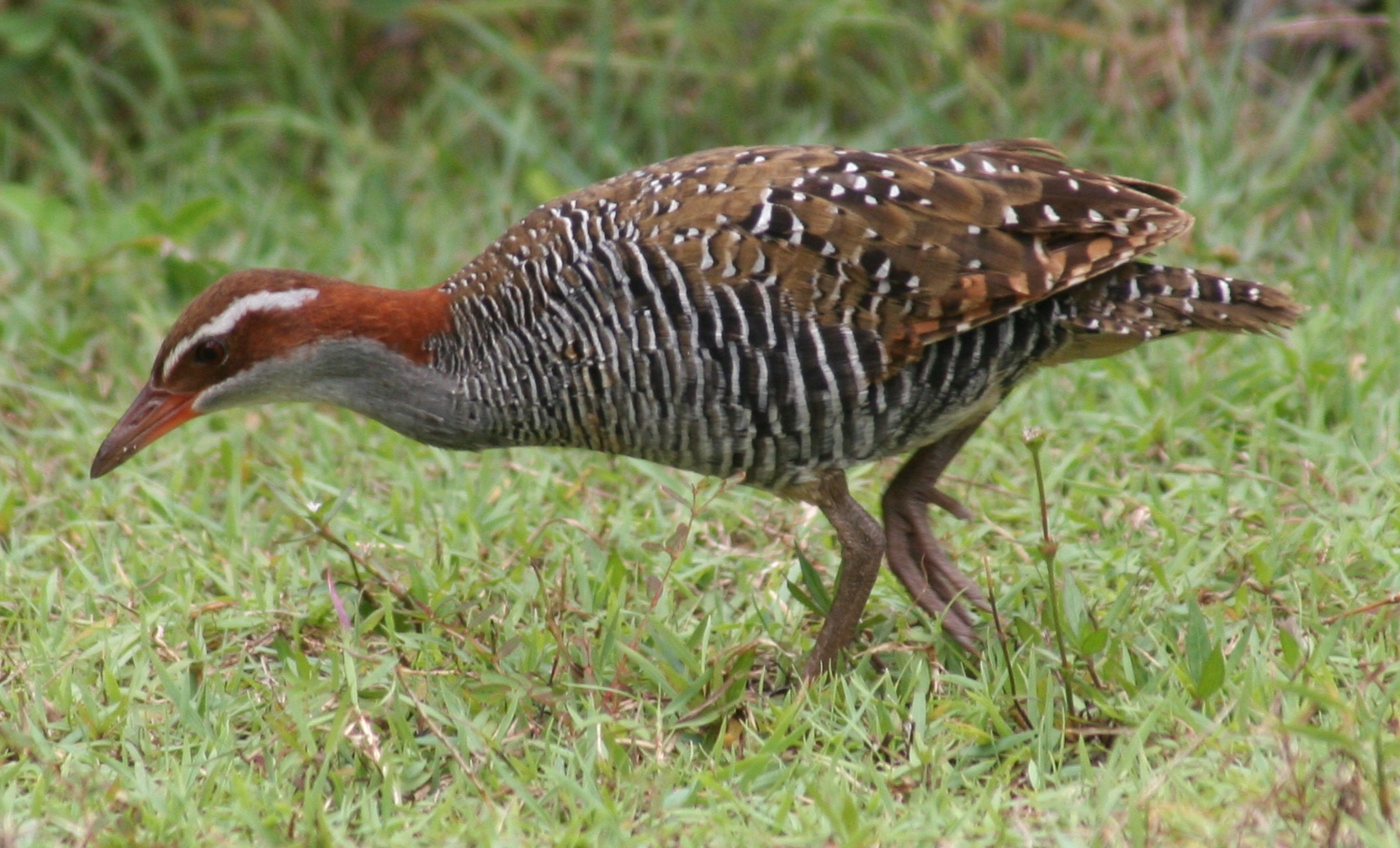
The Tongan subspecies of the buff-banded rail, which has been confused with the Tahiti rail

Forster also stated that the total length to the middle toe was 12.75 inches (324 mm) long, the bill was 1.1 inches (28 mm) long, the tibiae (shinbones) 2 inches (51 mm) long, and the middle toe 1.3 inches (33 mm) long. The Tahiti rail was similar to the buff-banded rail in the pattern of the nape and supercilium, and its spots and bars, but was otherwise generally distinct from other members of its genus.

Forster's plate (which Fuller described as "rather crude" yet "explicit") became the basis for other depictions of the bird, by artists such as John Gerrard Keulemans (1907), Fenwick Lansdowne (1977), and Hume (2012). Keulemans' illustration was made for the 1907 book Extinct Birds (before Forster's original had been published) by Rothschild, who pointed out that the legs had been painted too brightly red in the new adaptation, when they should instead have been flesh-coloured. Keulemans also depicted bars on the tail covert feathers not shown in the original, according to Ripley.

== Behaviour and ecology ==
The Tahiti rail was supposedly flightless, and nested on the ground. Its social behaviour is unknown. Bruner claimed to have gained information about the behaviour of the species from "the few people who still remember the bird". According to Bruner, the call of the bird was described as similar to that of other rails, though it differed in ending in a high-pitched whistle. It was said to have been seen in open areas, sometimes with other rails in marshes, and in coconut plantations. Its diet appears to have consisted mainly of insects found in grass, and it occasionally fed on copra (coconut meat). Its broken colour pattern was said to make it blend well with its surroundings, and it lacked "shyness".

== Extinction ==
The extinction of the Tahiti rail was probably due to predation by humans and introduced cats and rats. The small, outlying islands off Tahiti also have rats, though there were no cats on Mehetia at the time of Greenway's writing in 1967. According to Bruner, the bird was said to have been common on Tahiti until the end of the 19th century, beginning to decline thereafter; it had disappeared from there after 1844. It may have survived on the smaller, uninhabited island of Mehetia until the 1930s, perhaps due to the absence of cats. This later date is accepted by the IUCN Red List. Other extinct Tahitian birds include the Tahiti sandpiper and the black-fronted parakeet, and some species have disappeared from Tahiti itself but survive on other islands. According to Olson, it is possible that hundreds of rail populations have become extinct from islands following the arrival of humans within the past 1500 years.
