= Nuku Hiva rail =

Nuku Hiva rail Temporal range: Late Holocene

Conservation status
- Extinct

Scientific classification
- Kingdom: Animalia
- Phylum: Chordata
- Class: Aves
- Order: Gruiformes
- Family: Rallidae
- Genus: Gallirallus
- Species: †G. epulare

Binomial name
- †Gallirallus epulare Kirchman & Steadman, 2007

Extinct species of bird

The Nuku Hiva rail (Gallirallus epulare) is an extinct species of flightless bird in the Rallidae, or rail family.

== History ==
The rail was described in 2007 from subfossil bones collected in 1994-1995 by archaeologists B. V. Rolett, E. Conte and their colleagues at the Ha'atuatua archaeological site, on the island of Nuku Hiva in the Marquesas Islands of French Polynesia. The site dates to about 1000 yr BP, from the early period of human settlement of the island.

== Etymology ==
The specific epithet comes from the Latin epularis (pertaining to a banquet) which refers to the discovery of the specimens in a kitchen midden containing the remains of meals eaten by prehistoric Polynesians.
