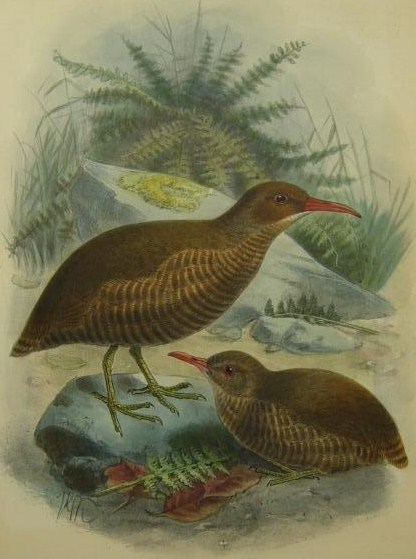
- Illustration by Keulemans

Conservation status
- Extinct (c.1900) (IUCN 3.1)

- Extinct (c.1900) (NZ TCS)

Scientific classification
- Kingdom: Animalia
- Phylum: Chordata
- Class: Aves
- Order: Gruiformes
- Family: Rallidae
- Genus: Gallirallus
- Species: †G. modestus

Binomial name
- †Gallirallus modestus (Hutton, 1872)

Synonyms
- Cabalus modestus; Rallus modestus

= Chatham Islands rail =

Extinct species of bird

The Chatham Islands rail (Gallirallus modestus), also known as the Chatham rail, is an extinct flightless species of bird in the family Rallidae. It was endemic to Chatham, Mangere and Pitt Islands, in the Chatham archipelago of New Zealand. The Chatham Islands rail was first discovered on Mangere in 1871, and 26 specimens collected there are known from museum collections. Its Māori name was "mātirakahu".

== Taxonomy ==
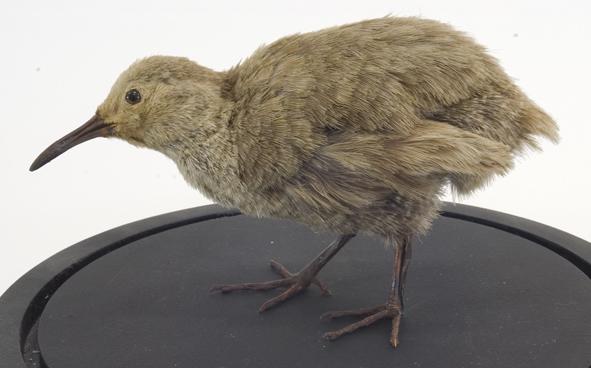
Cabalus modestus mount from the collection of Auckland Museum

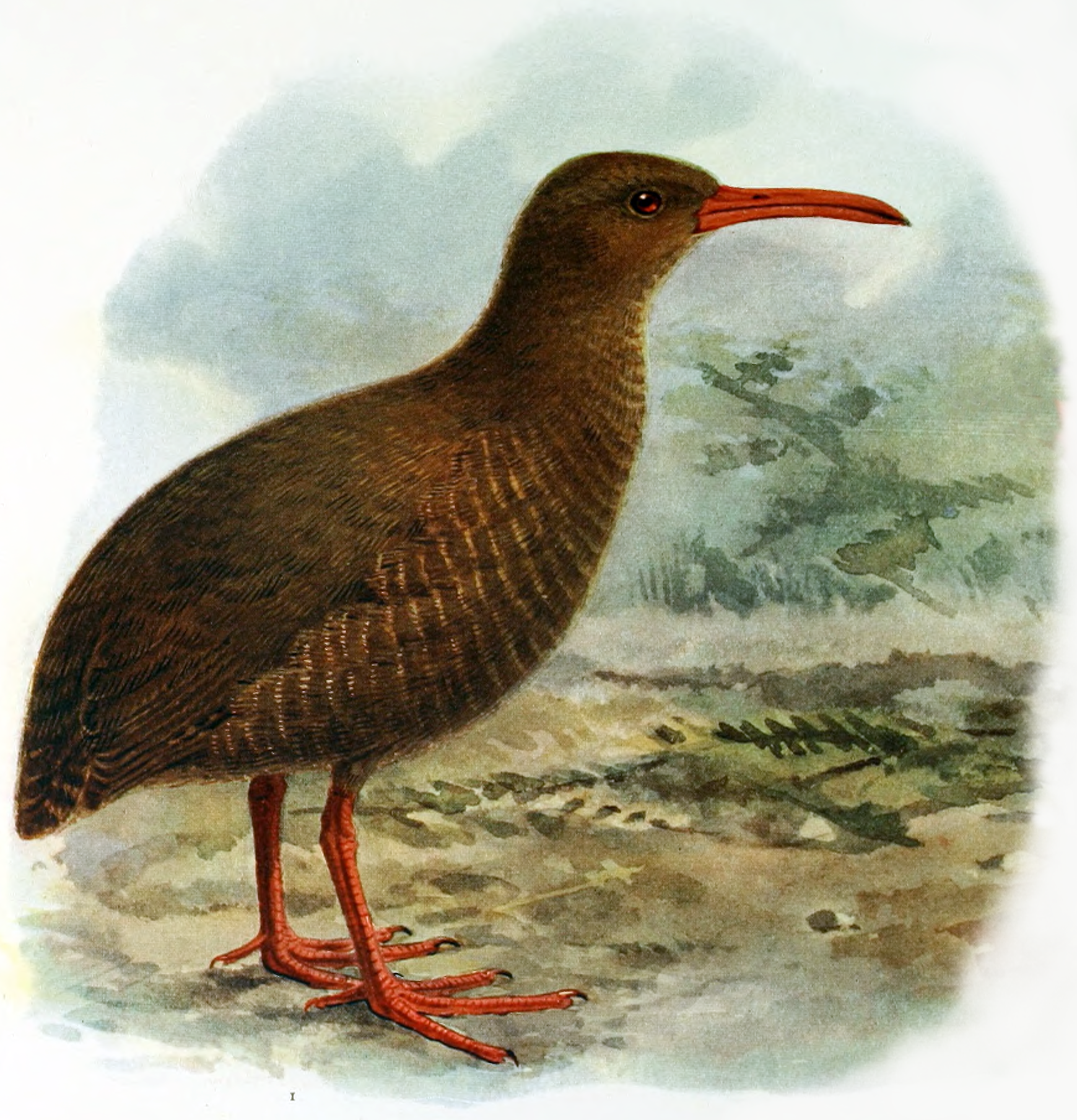
Illustration from 1907

The Chatham Islands rail and the Dieffenbach's rail, both extinct and flightless, were sympatric on the Chatham Islands. Their sympatry suggests parallel evolution after separate colonisation of the Chatham Islands by different rail ancestors. A genetic analysis from 1997 suggested that the two were sister taxa. However more recent genetic analysis finds them to not be closely related within the Gallirallus radiation, with a 2014 analysis finding the Chatham Islands rail being sister taxon to the possibly extinct New Caledonian rail instead.

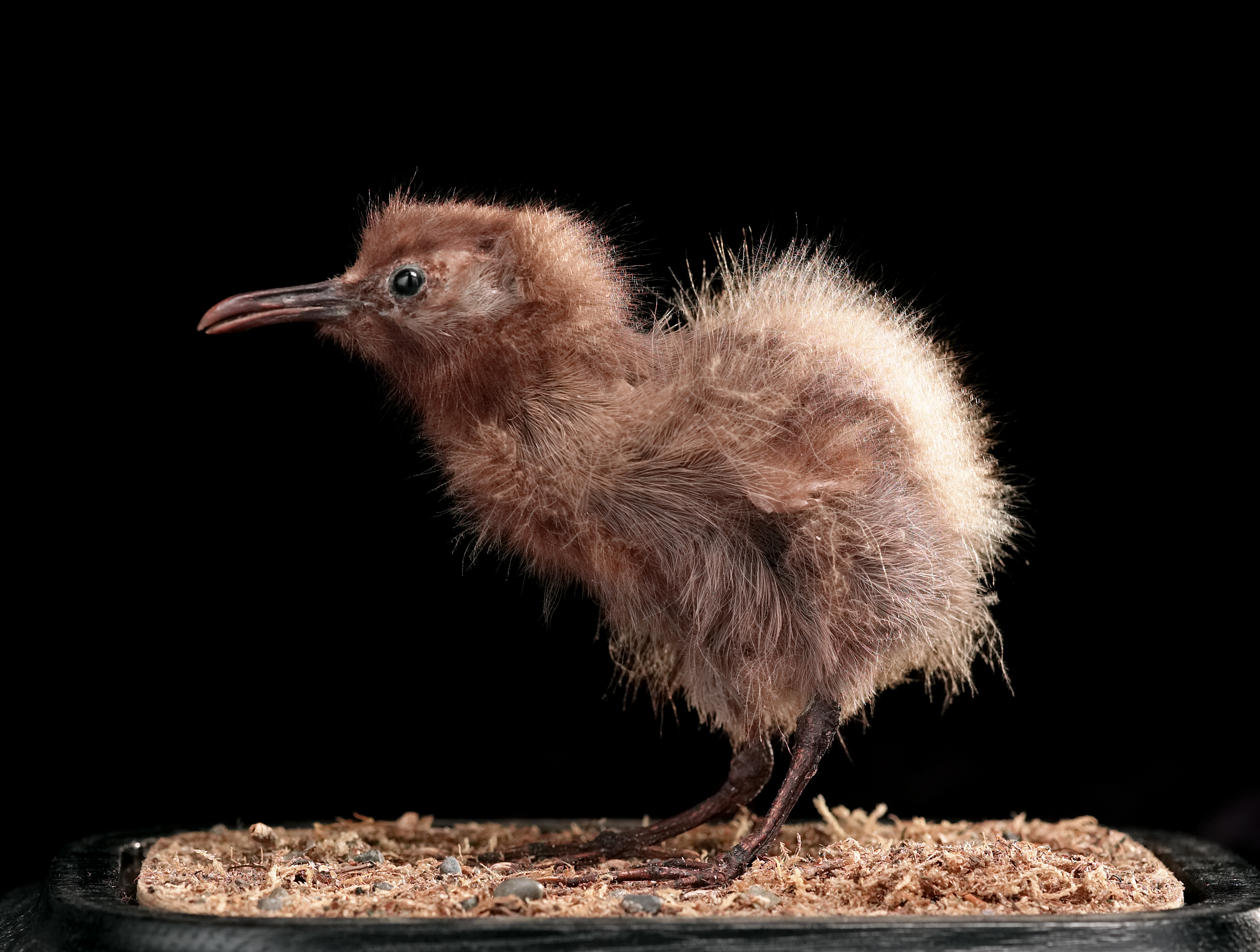
Taxidermied chick collected in 1872

Currently, AviList and Clements include both species in the expanded Gallirallus.

== Extinction ==
The Chatham Islands rail was first discovered in 1871, and 26 specimens are known in museum collections. The last known live individuals were found in 1893.

It became extinct on the island between 1896 and 1900. The species is also known from 19th century bones from Chatham and Pitt Islands. It is likely to have occurred in scrubland and tussock grass. Its extinction was presumably caused by predation by rats and cats (which were introduced in the 1890s), habitat destruction to provide sheep pasture (which destroyed all the island's bush and tussock grass by 1900), and from grazing by goats and rabbits. On Chatham and Pitt Islands, Olson has suggested that its extinction resulted from competition with the larger Dieffenbach's rail (also extinct), but this has been refuted later when the two species have been shown to have been sympatric on Mangere.

Preserved skin

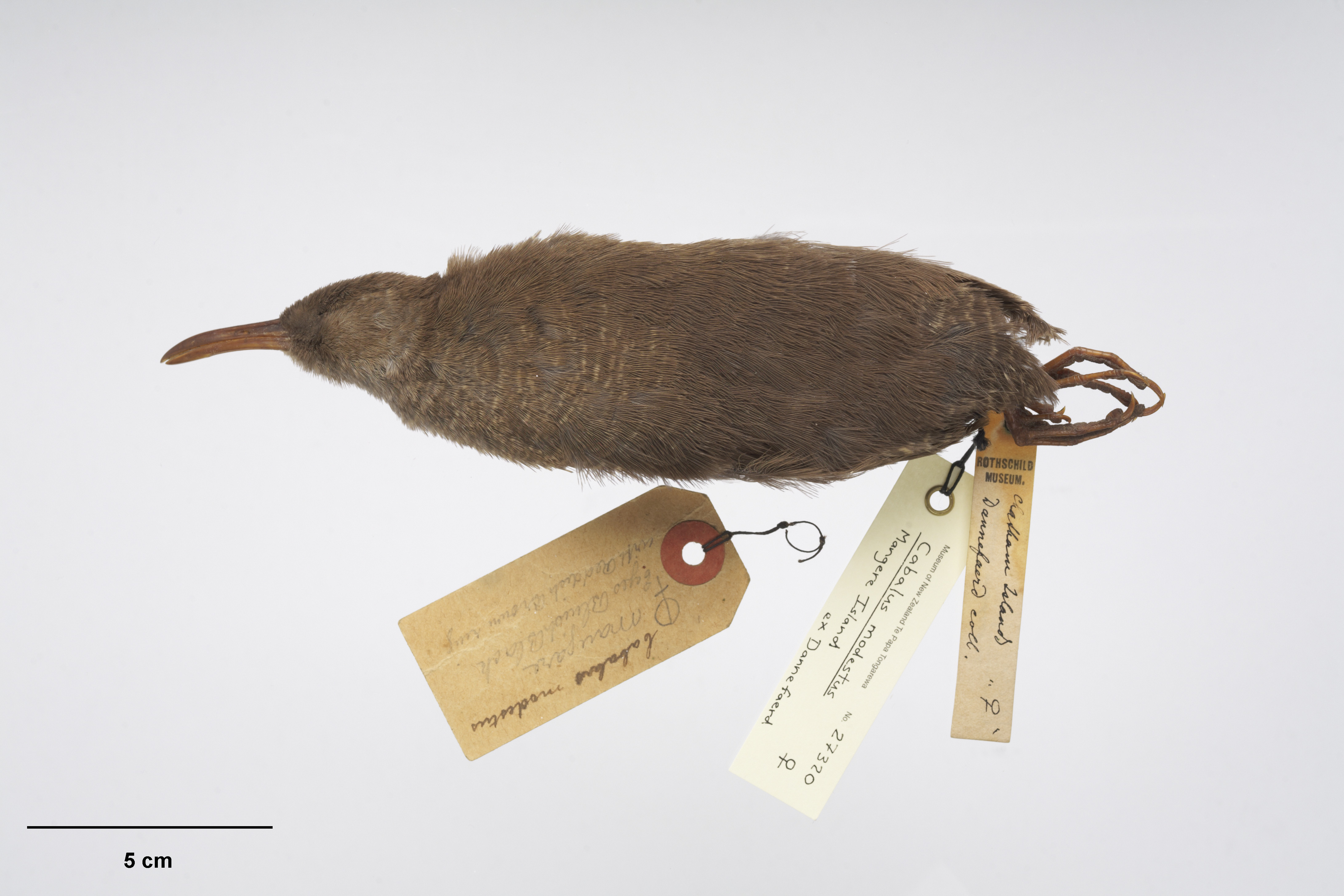

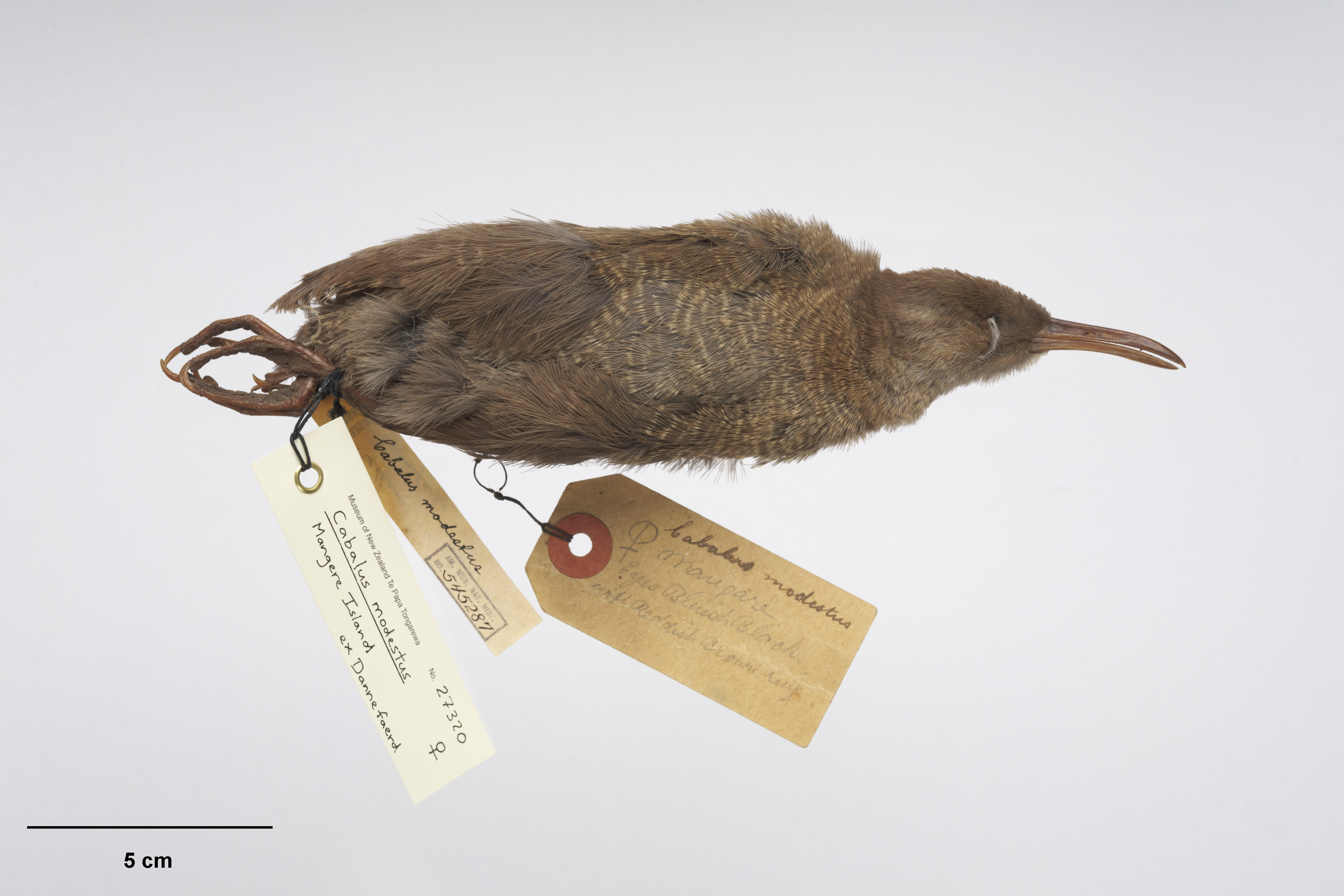
Various views of the skull of the Chatham Islands rail

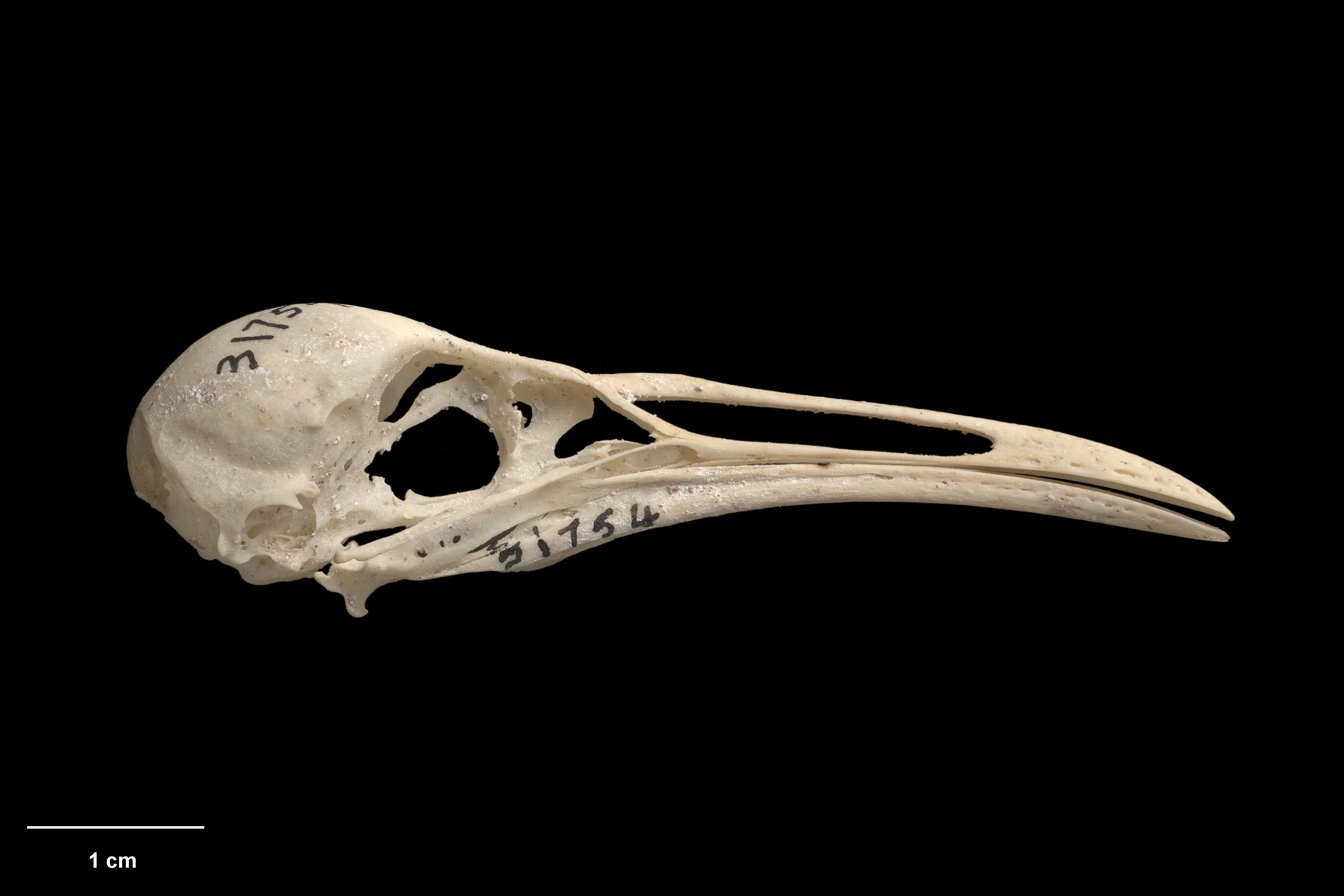
Lateral view

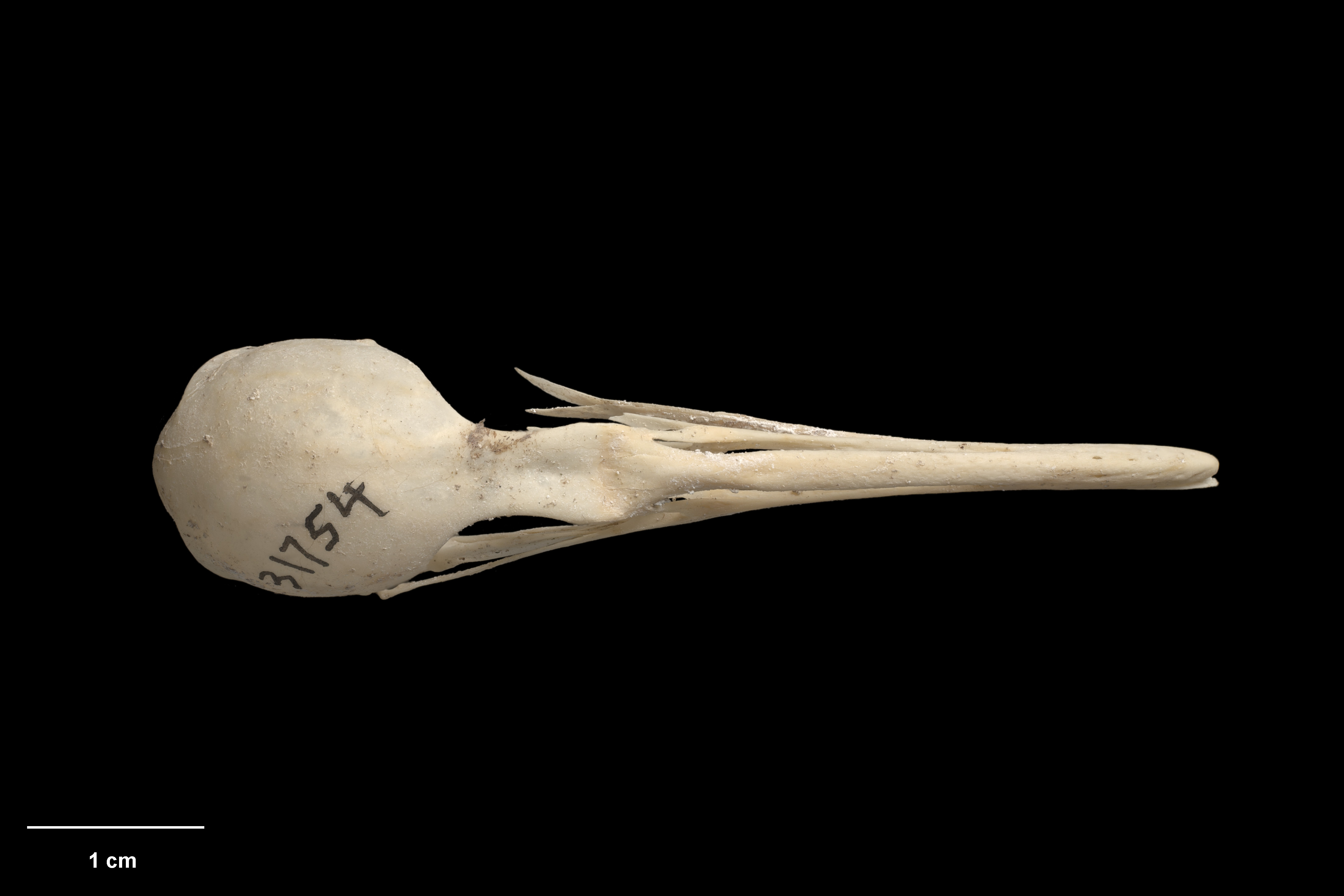
Dorsal view

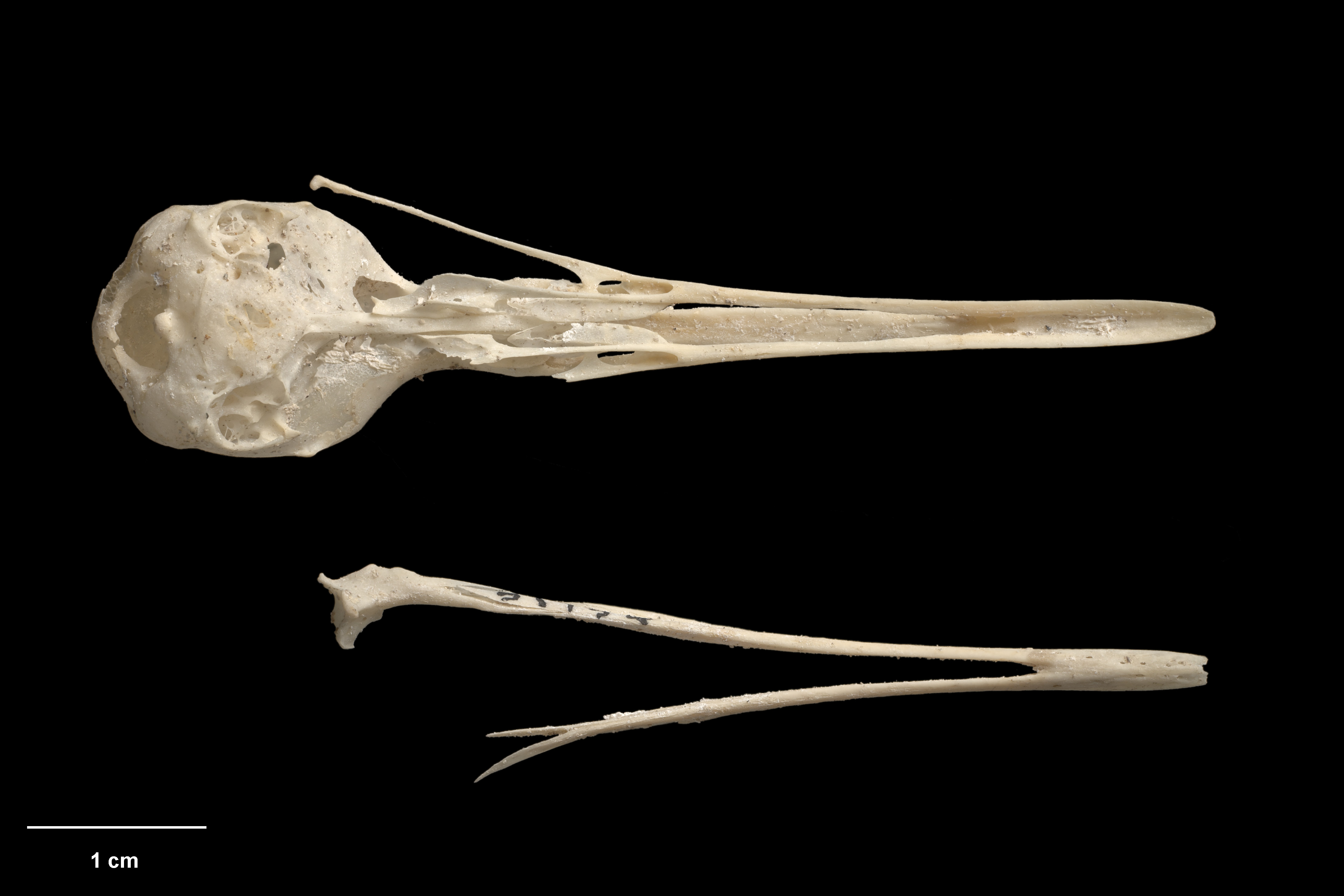
Ventral view

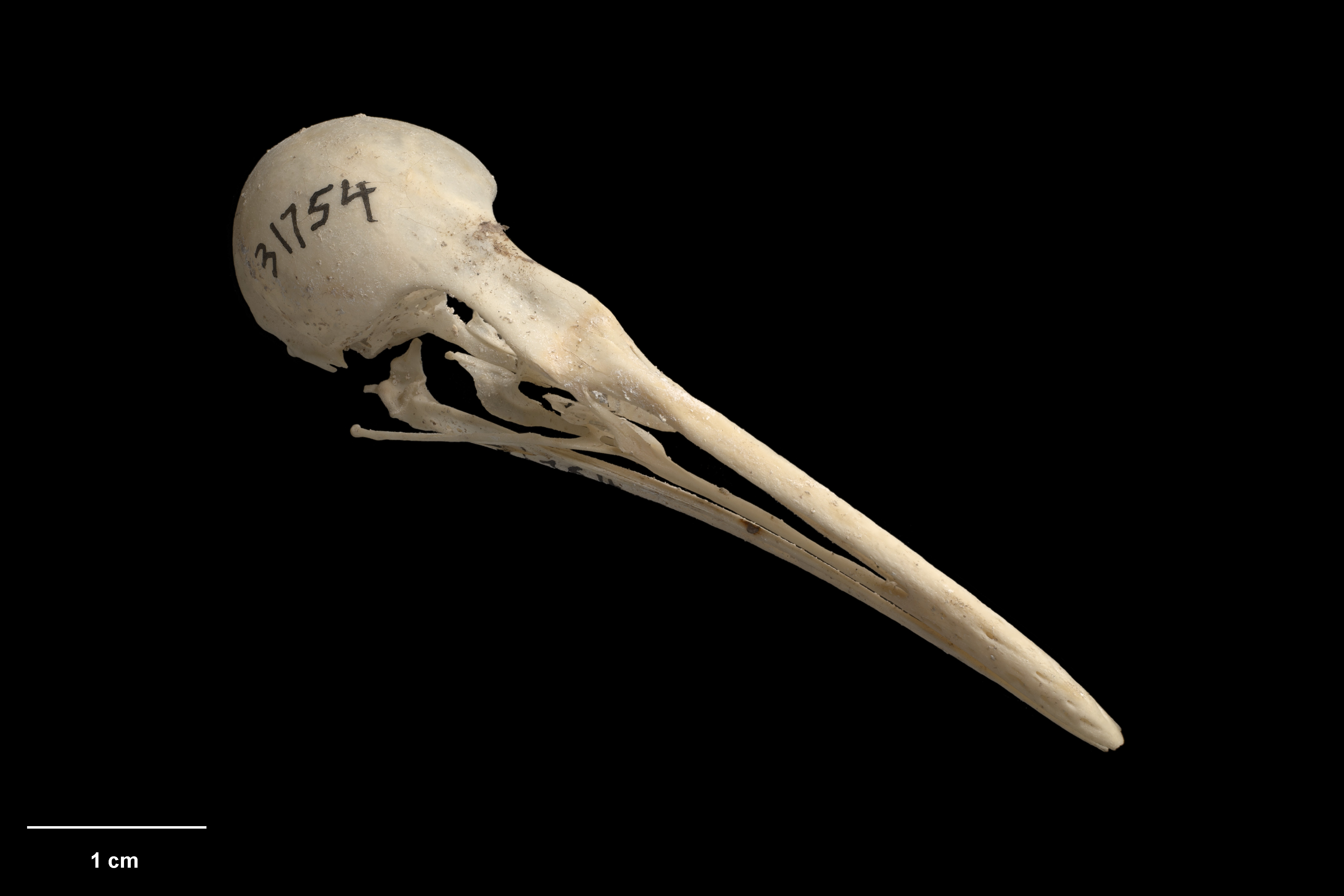
Oblique view

== See also ==
- Hawkins's rail, another extinct flightless rail endemic to the Chatham Islands.
