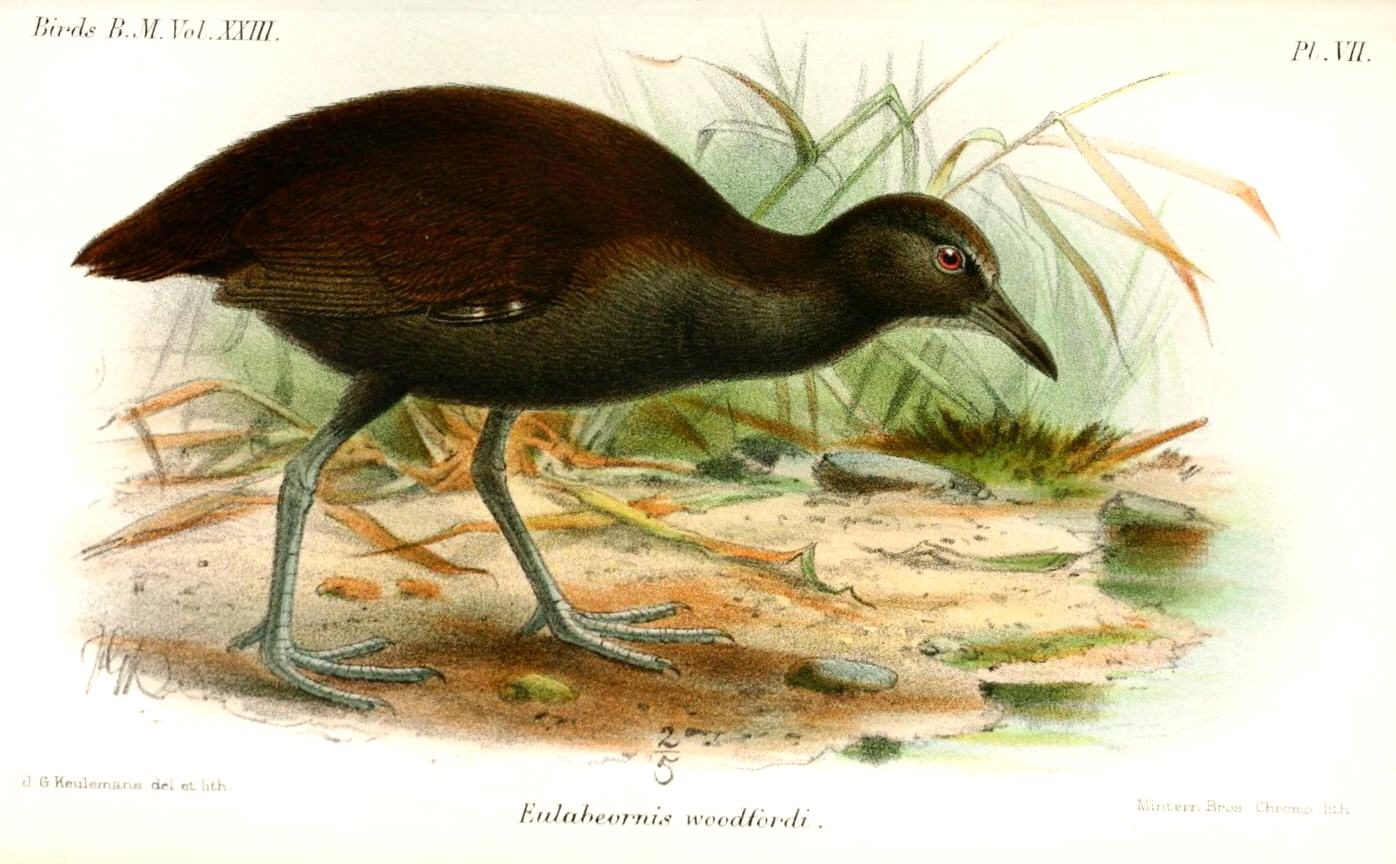
- Illustration by Keulemans, 1894
- Gallirallus woodfordi tertius in Bougainville, Papua New Guinea

Conservation status
- Least Concern (IUCN 3.1)

Scientific classification
- Kingdom: Animalia
- Phylum: Chordata
- Class: Aves
- Order: Gruiformes
- Family: Rallidae
- Genus: Gallirallus
- Species: G. woodfordi

Binomial name
- Gallirallus woodfordi (Ogilvie-Grant, 1889)

Synonyms
- Nesoclopeus woodfordi; Hypotaenidia woodfordi; Rallina woodfordi; Eulabeornis woodfordi

= Woodford's rail =

Species of flightless bird

Woodford's rail (Gallirallus woodfordi), also known as the Guadalcanal rail, is a species of flightless bird and large rail in the family Rallidae.

== Taxonomy ==
This species has been placed in various different genera, including Eulabeornis, Rallina, Rallus, Nesoclopeus, and Hypotaenidia.

There are three distinct subspecies, which may represent individual phylogenetic species:

- G. w. tertius (Bougainville Island)
- G. w. immaculatus (Santa Isabel Island)
- G. w. woodfordi (Guadalcanal Island)

== Description ==
Woodford's rail is a large, robust, and flightless rail. It is about 30 cm (12 in) in length and weighs between 410–670 g (0.90–1.48 lb). It is mostly a dark brown, gray, or black in coloration. It can run rapidly and uses its wings when trying to escape danger.

== Distribution and habitat ==
It is endemic to the Solomon Islands archipelago. Its natural habitats are subtropical or tropical moist lowland forest, subtropical or tropical swamps, rivers, freshwater lakes, freshwater marshes, and rural gardens.

== Behavior ==
On Santa Isabel, it feeds on worms, insects, reptiles, amphibians, and snails, as well as plant material. The other populations are likely similar.

Its nest is made of plants and is about 25 cm (9.8 in) across. It lays clutches of two to six eggs, which are oval and creamy-buff with blotches and spots. These eggs measure about 45 mm × 33 mm (1.8 in × 1.3 in) on Bougainville Island, and are reportedly 30–40 mm (1.2–1.6 in) long on Santa Isabel.

== Status and conservation ==
It is currently threatened by habitat loss and was the only surviving species of the genus Nesoclopeus. However, recent genetic evidence finds that the species is nested within Gallirallus, as sister taxon to the Guam rail.
