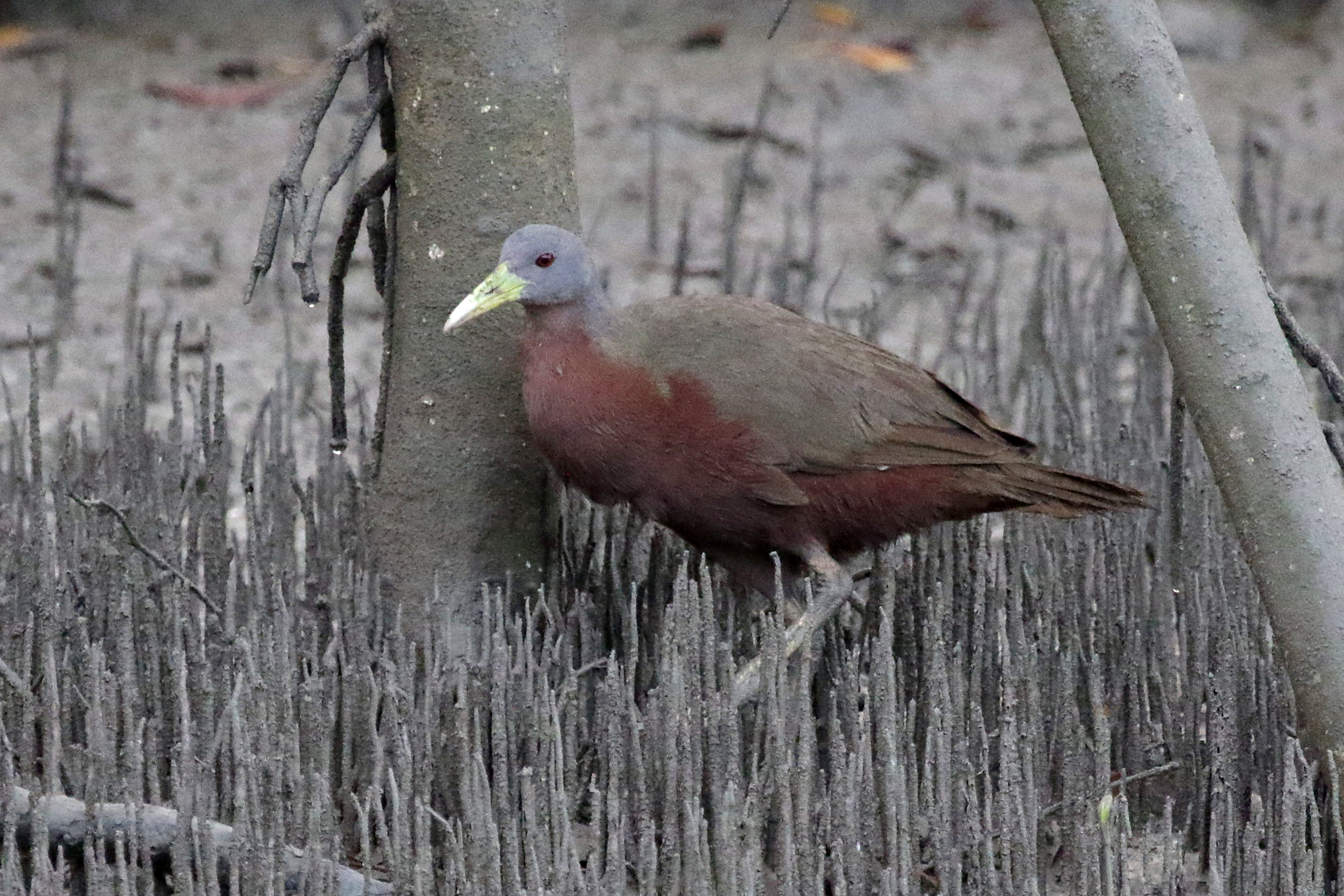

Conservation status
- Least Concern (IUCN 3.1)

Scientific classification
- Kingdom: Animalia
- Phylum: Chordata
- Class: Aves
- Order: Gruiformes
- Family: Rallidae
- Genus: Gallirallus
- Species: G. castaneoventris

Binomial name
- Gallirallus castaneoventris (Gould, 1844)

Synonyms
- Eulabeornis castaneoventris

= Chestnut rail =

Species of bird

The chestnut rail (Gallirallus castaneoventris) is a species of bird in the family Rallidae. It is the largest rail in its habitat, and has two color morphs.

== Taxonomy ==
The chestnut rail was formerly placed in the genus Eulabeornis.

It has two described subspecies, G. c. sharpei of the Aru Islands, and G. c. castaneoventris of northern Australia.

== Description ==
The chestnut rail is the largest rail in its habitat. The sexes are similar but males are larger than females, with the male being 52 cm (20 in) long and weighing 626–910 g (1.38–2.01 lb) while the female weighs 550–710 g (1.21–1.57 lb). It has a long tail, greenish bill, and pale yellow or green legs. The underparts are a pinkish-brown color, varying in brightness. In the olive color morph, the upperparts are more olive-brown colored while in the chestnut color morph they are a dark brown.

== Behavior ==
The chestnut rail mainly feeds on crustaceans, but will also consume small molluscs, insects, and centipedes.

Their nests are shaped into platforms and range in size from 35–50 cm in diameter, and 5–10 cm in depth. They are built in mangrove trees out of predominantly mangrove sticks, along with some leaves and seedlings. Clutch size ranges from 2–5 eggs per brood. In dimensions, three eggs of one clutch were about 53 mm × 35 mm (2.1 in × 1.4 in) while one egg from a different clutch was 46 mm × 35 mm (1.8 in × 1.4 in). The chicks are a dark brown and leave the nest soon after hatching.

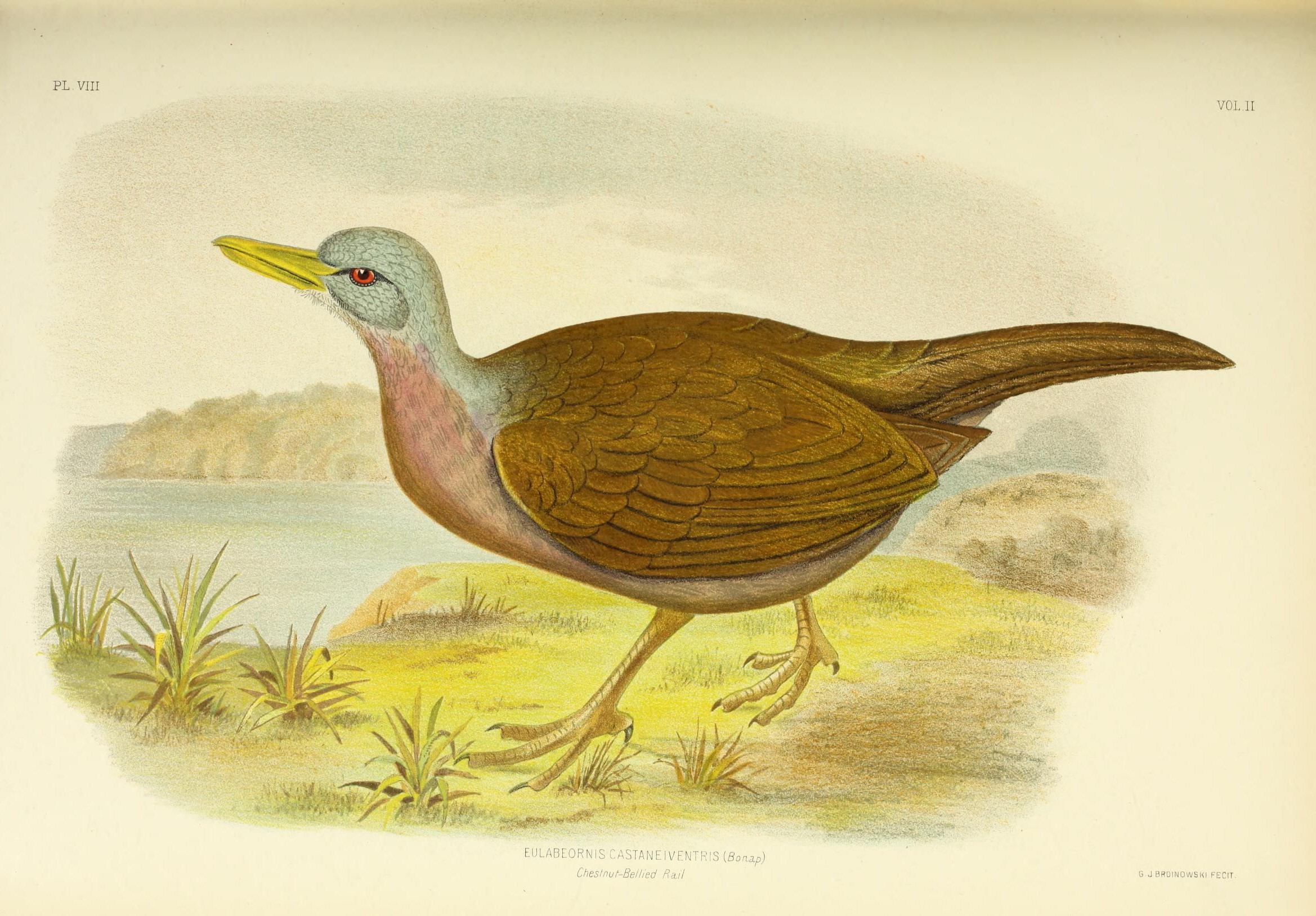
Early illustration by Broinowski
