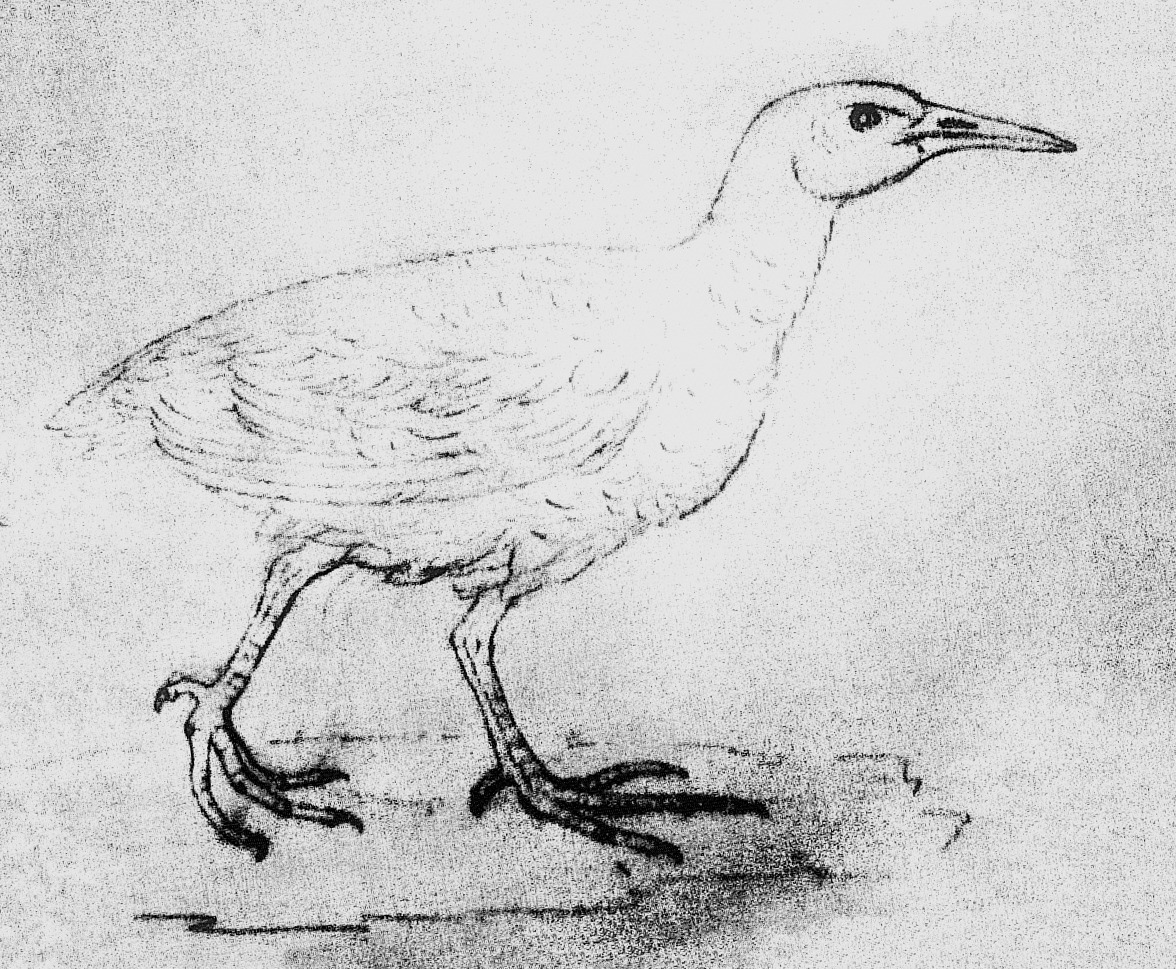
- Illustration of an unidentified extinct species (possibly G. vekamatolu) from Vavaʻu, 1739

Conservation status
- Extinct

Scientific classification
- Kingdom: Animalia
- Phylum: Chordata
- Class: Aves
- Order: Gruiformes
- Family: Rallidae
- Genus: Gallirallus
- Species: †G. vekamatolu

Binomial name
- †Gallirallus vekamatolu Kirchman & Steadman, 2005

= ʻEua rail =

ʻEua rail Temporal range: Holocene

Species of bird

The ʻEua rail (Gallirallus vekamatolu) is an extinct species of flightless bird in the Rallidae, or rail family. It was described in 2005 from subfossil bones found on the island of ʻEua, in the Kingdom of Tonga of West Polynesia.
