= Flightless bird =

Birds that cannot fly

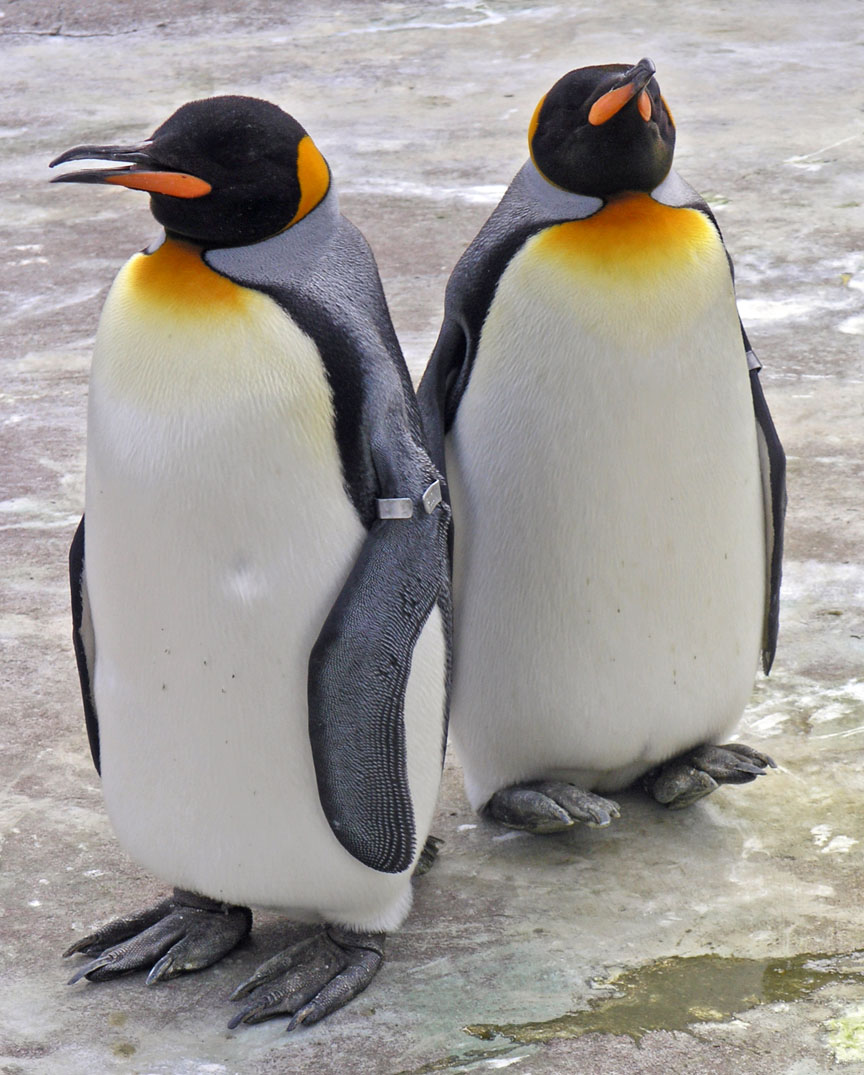
King penguins (Aptenodytes patagonicus). Penguins are a well-known example of flightless birds.

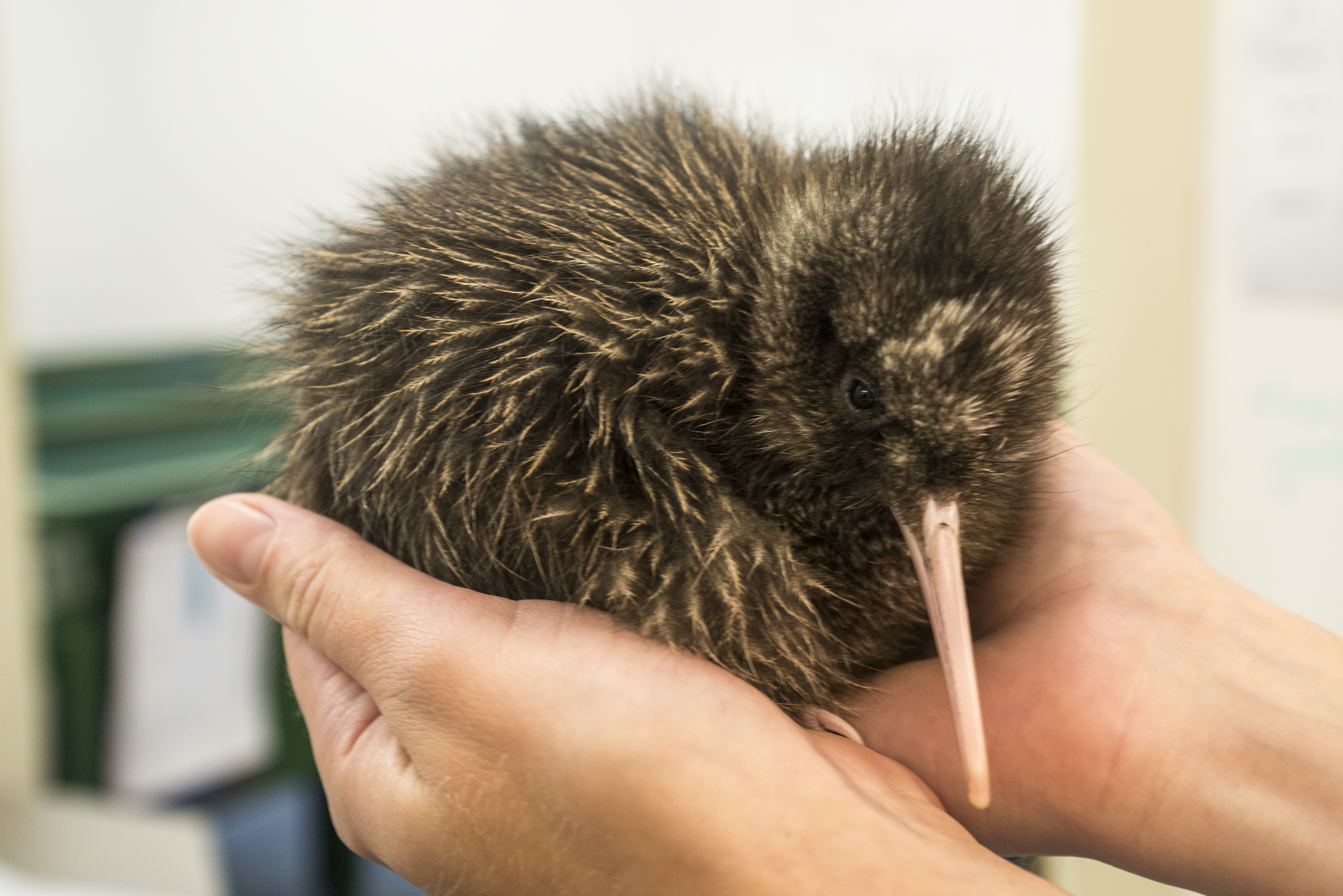
An Okarito kiwi (Apteryx rowi), also known as the rowi

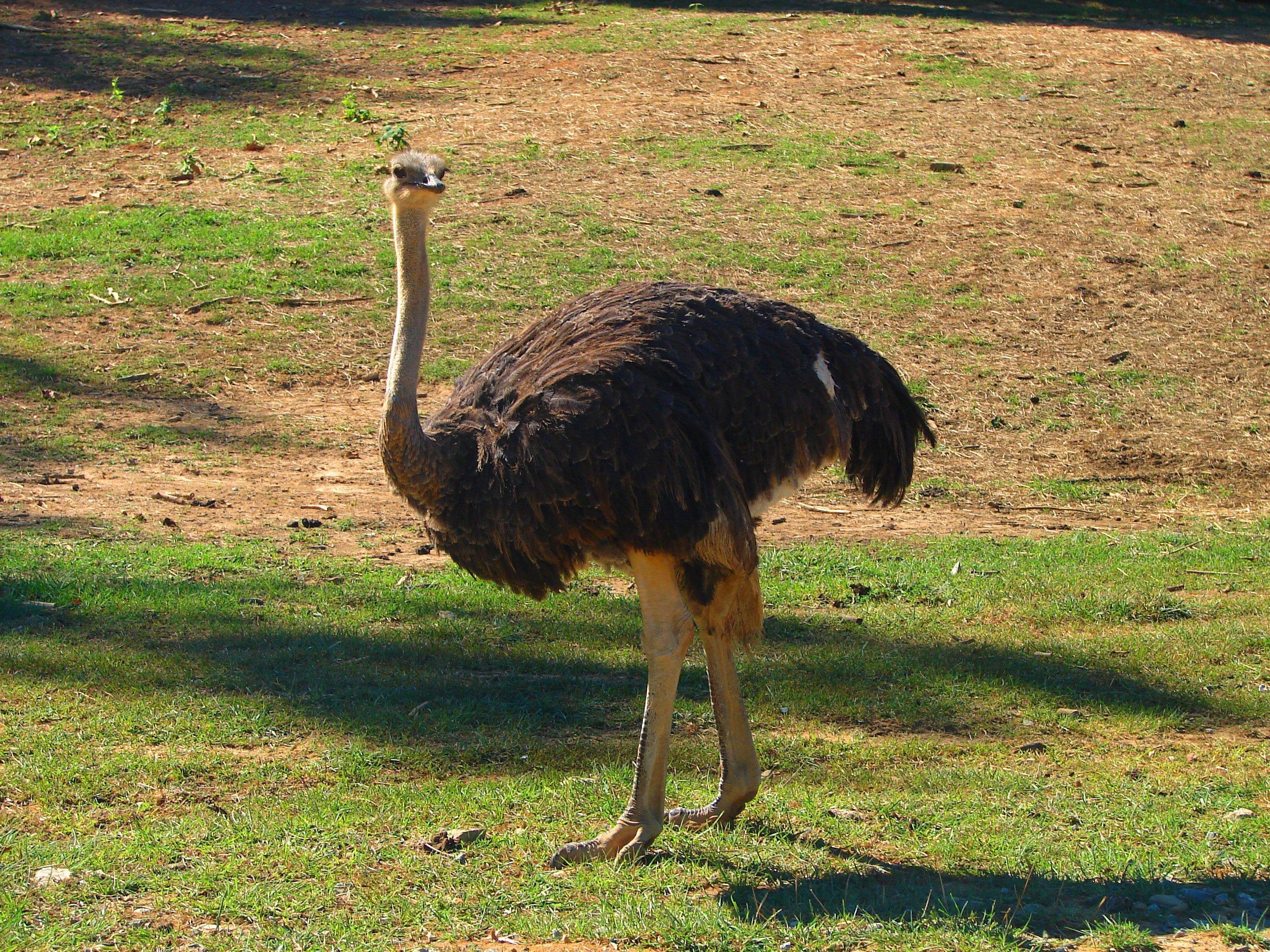
Common ostrich (Struthio camelus). Ostriches are the largest extant flightless birds as well as the largest extant birds in general.

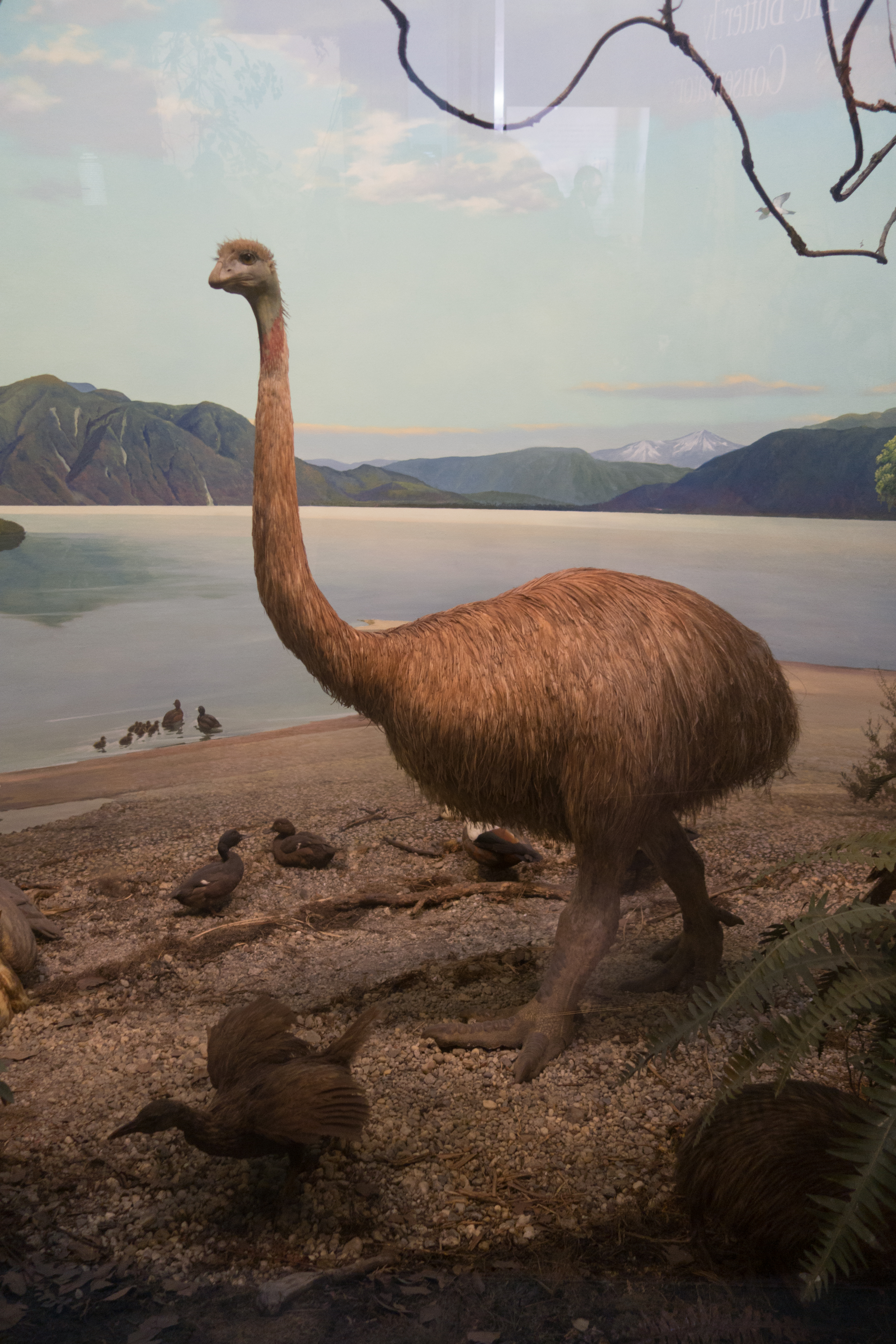
An extinct moa. Until the arrival of humans, New Zealand's only mammals were bats and seals, resulting in many bird species evolving to fill the open niches. While many of New Zealand's flightless birds are now extinct, some, such as the kiwi, kākāpō, weka, and takahē have survived to the present day.

Flightless birds are birds that cannot fly, as they have, through evolution, lost the ability. There are over 60 extant species, including the well-known ratites (ostriches (Struthio), emus (Dromaius), cassowaries (Casuarius), rheas, kiwis (Apteryx)), and penguins (Sphenisciformes). The smallest flightless bird is the Inaccessible Island rail (length 12.5 cm, weight 34.7 g). The largest (both heaviest and tallest) flightless bird, which is also the largest living bird in general, is the common ostrich (2.7 m, 156 kg).

Some domesticated birds, such as the chicken, have lost the ability to fly for extended periods, although their ancestral species, the red junglefowl and others, respectively, are capable of extended flight. A few particularly bred birds, such as the Broad Breasted White turkey, have become totally flightless as a result of selective breeding; the birds were bred to grow massive breast meat that weighs too much for the bird's wings to support in flight.

Flightlessness has evolved in many different birds independently, demonstrating repeated convergent evolution. There were families of flightless birds, such as the now-extinct Phorusrhacidae, that evolved to be powerful terrestrial predators. Taking this to a greater extreme, the terror birds (and their relatives the bathornithids), eogruids, geranoidids, gastornithiforms, and dromornithids (all extinct) all evolved similar body shapes – long legs, long necks and big heads – but none of them were closely related. Furthermore, they also share traits with some of the ratites of being giant, flightless birds with vestigial wings, long legs, and long necks, although they are unrelated.

== History ==
=== Origins of flightlessness ===
Divergences and losses of flight within ratite lineage occurred right after the K-Pg extinction event wiped out all non-avian dinosaurs and large vertebrates 66 million years ago. The immediate evacuation of niches following the mass extinction provided opportunities for Palaeognathes to distribute and occupy novel environments. New ecological influences selectively pressured different taxa to converge on flightless modes of existence by altering them morphologically and behaviorally. The successful acquisition and protection of a claimed territory selected for large size and cursoriality in Tertiary ancestors of ratites. Temperate rainforests dried out throughout the Miocene and transformed into semiarid deserts, causing habitats to be widely spread across the growingly disparate landmasses. Cursoriality was an economic means of traveling long distances to acquire food that was usually low-lying vegetation, more easily accessed by walking. Traces of these events are reflected in ratite distribution throughout semiarid grasslands and deserts today.

Gigantism and flightlessness in birds are almost exclusively correlated due to islands lacking mammalian or reptilian predators and competition. However, ratites occupy environments that are mostly occupied by a diverse number of mammals. It was thought that they first originated through allopatric speciation caused by breakup of the supercontinent Gondwana. However, later evidence suggests this hypothesis first proposed by Joel Cracraft in 1974 is incorrect. Rather, ratites arrived in their respective locations via a flighted ancestor and lost the ability to fly multiple times within the lineage.

Gigantism is not a requirement for flightlessness. The kiwi does not exhibit gigantism, along with tinamous, even though they coexisted with the moa and rheas that both exhibit gigantism. This could be the result of different ancestral flighted birds arrival or because of competitive exclusion. The first flightless bird to arrive in each environment utilized the large flightless herbivore or omnivore niche, forcing the later arrivals to remain smaller. In environments where flightless birds are not present, it is possible that after the K/T Boundary there were no niches for them to fill. They were pushed out by other herbivorous mammals.

New Zealand had more species of flightless birds (including the kiwi, several species of penguins, the takahē, the weka, the moa, and several other extinct species) than any other such location. One reason is that until the arrival of humans roughly a thousand years ago, there were no large mammalian land predators in New Zealand; the main predators of flightless birds were larger birds.

==== Independent evolution of flightlessness in Palaeognathes ====
Ratites belong to the superorder Palaeognathae, which include the volant tinamou, and are believed to have evolved flightlessness independently multiple times within their own group. Some birds evolved flightlessness in response to the absence of predators, for example on oceanic islands. Incongruences between ratite phylogeny and Gondwana geological history indicate the presence of ratites in their current locations is the result of a secondary invasion by flying birds. It remains possible that the most recent common ancestor of ratites was flightless and the tinamou regained the ability to fly. However, it is believed that the loss of flight is an easier transition for birds than the loss and regain of flight, which has never been documented in avian history. Moreover, tinamou nesting within flightless ratites indicates ancestral ratites were volant and multiple losses of flight occurred independently throughout the lineage. This indicates that the distinctive flightless nature of ratites is the result of convergent evolution.

== Morphological changes and energy conservation ==
Two key differences between flying and flightless birds are the smaller wing bones of flightless birds and the absent (or greatly reduced) keel on their breastbone, which anchors muscles needed for wing movement.

Adapting to a cursorial lifestyle causes two inverse morphological changes to occur in the skeleto-muscular system: the pectoral apparatus used to power flight is paedorphically reduced while peramorphosis leads to enlargement of the pelvic girdle for running. Repeated selection for cursorial traits across ratites suggests these adaptions comprise a more efficient use of energy in adulthood. The name "ratite" comes from the Latin ratis, raft, a vessel with no keel. Their flat sternum is distinct from the typical sternum of flighted birds because it lacks a keel, like a raft. This structure is the place where flight muscles attach and thus allow for powered flight. However, ratite anatomy presents other primitive characters meant for flight, such as the fusion of wing elements, a cerebellar structure, the presence of a pygostyle for tail feathers, and an alula on the wing. These morphological traits suggest some affinities to volant groups. Palaeognathes were one of the first colonizers of novel niches and were free to increase in abundance until the population was limited by food and territory. A study looking at energy conservation and the evolution of flightlessness hypothesized intraspecific competition selected for a reduced individual energy expenditure, which is achieved by the loss of flight.

Some flightless varieties of island birds are closely related to flying varieties, implying flight is a significant biological cost. Flight is the most costly type of locomotion exemplified in the natural world. The energy expenditure required for flight increases proportionally with body size, which is often why flightlessness coincides with body mass. By reducing large pectoral muscles that require a significant amount of overall metabolic energy, ratites decrease their basal metabolic rate and conserve energy. A study looking at the basal rates of birds found a significant correlation between low basal rate and pectoral muscle mass in kiwis. On the contrary, flightless penguins exhibit an intermediate basal rate. This is likely because penguins have well-developed pectoral muscles for hunting and diving in the water. For ground-feeding birds, a cursorial lifestyle is more economical and allows for easier access to dietary requirements. Flying birds have different wing and feather structures that make flying easier, while flightless birds' wing structures are well adapted to their environment and activities, such as diving in the ocean.

Species with certain characteristics are more likely to evolve flightlessness. For example, species that already have shorter wings are more likely to lose flight ability. Some species will evolve flatter wings so that they move more efficiently underwater at the cost of their flight. Additionally, birds that undergo simultaneous wing molt, in which they replace all of the feathers in their wings at once during the year, are more likely to evolve flight loss.

A number of bird species appear to be in the process of losing their powers of flight to various extents. These include the Zapata rail of Cuba, the Okinawa rail of Japan, and the Laysan duck of Hawaii. All of these birds show adaptations common to flightlessness, and evolved recently from fully flighted ancestors, but have not yet completely given up the ability to fly. They are, however, weak fliers and are incapable of traveling long distances by air.

=== Continued presence of wings in flightless birds ===
Although selection pressure for flight was largely absent, the wing structure has not been lost except in the New Zealand moas. Ostriches are the fastest running birds in the world and emus have been documented running 50 km/h. At these high speeds, wings are necessary for balance and serving as a parachute apparatus to help the bird slow down. Wings are hypothesized to have played a role in sexual selection in early ancestral ratites and were thus maintained. This can be seen today in both the rheas and ostriches. These ratites utilize their wings extensively for courtship and displays to other males. Sexual selection also influences the maintenance of large body size, which discourages flight. The large size of ratites leads to greater access to mates and higher reproductive success. Ratites and tinamous are monogamous and mate only a limited number of times per year. High parental involvement denotes the necessity for choosing a reliable mate. In a climatically stable habitat providing year-round food supply, a male's claimed territory signals to females the abundance of resources readily available to her and her offspring. Male size also indicates his protective abilities. Similar to the emperor penguin, male ratites incubate and protect their offspring anywhere between 85 and 92 days while females feed. They can go up to a week without eating and survive only off fat stores. The emu has been documented fasting for as long as 56 days. If no continued pressures warrant the energy expenditure to maintain the structures of flight, selection will tend towards these other traits.

In penguins, wing structure is maintained for use in locomotion underwater. Penguins evolved their wing structure to become more efficient underwater at the cost of their efficiency in the air.

The only known species of flightless bird in which wings completely disappeared was the gigantic, herbivorous moa of New Zealand, hunted to extinction by humans by the 15th century. In moa, the entire pectoral girdle is reduced to a paired scapulocoracoid, which is the size of a finger.

== List of flightless birds ==
Many flightless birds are extinct; this list shows species that are either still extant or became extinct in the Holocene (no more than 11,000 years ago). A number of species suspected, but not confirmed to be flightless, are also included here.

(†) - Indicates an extinct species.

Longer-extinct groups of flightless birds include the Cretaceous patagopterygiformes, hesperornithids, the Cenozoic phorusrhacids ("terror birds") and related bathornithids, the unrelated eogruids, geranoidids, gastornithiforms, and dromornithids (mihirungs or "demon ducks"), and the plotopterids.

=== Palaeognathae (ratites) ===
==== Struthioniformes (ostriches) ====
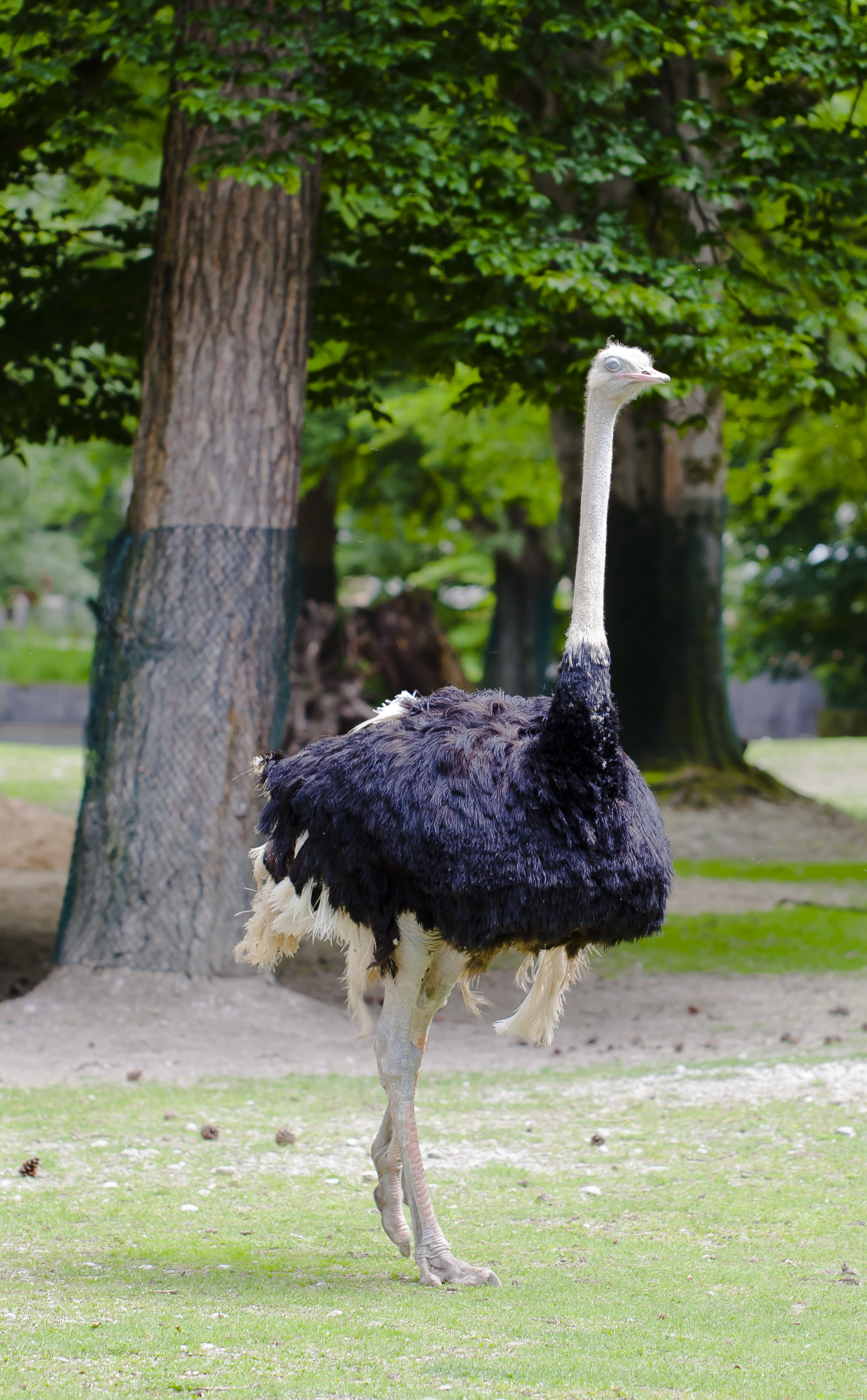
Common ostrich

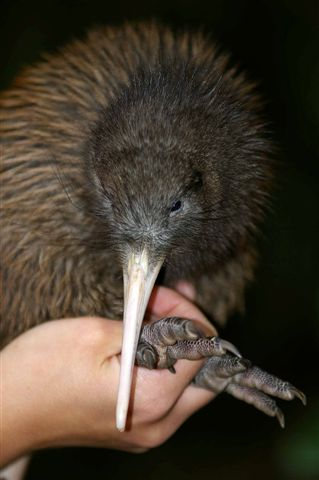
North Island brown kiwi

- Common ostrich, Struthio camelus
  - North African ostrich, Struthio camelus camelus
  - South African ostrich, Struthio camelus australis
  - Masai ostrich, Struthio camelus massaicus
  - Arabian ostrich, Struthio camelus syriacus †
- Somali ostrich, Struthio molybdophanes
- Asian ostrich, Struthio asiaticus †
- East Asian ostrich, Struthio anderssoni †

==== Casuariiformes (cassowaries and emus) ====
- Common emu, Dromaius novaehollandiae
  - Mainland emu, Dromaius novaehollandiae novaehollandiae
  - King Island emu, Dromaius novaehollandiae minor †
  - Kangaroo Island emu, Dromaius novaehollandiae baudinianus †
  - Tasmanian emu, Dromaius novaehollandiae diemenensis †
- Pygmy cassowary, Casuarius lydekkeri †
- Dwarf cassowary, Casuarius bennetti
  - Bennett's cassowary, Casuarius bennetti bennetti
  - Papuan dwarf cassowary, Casuarius bennetti westermanni
- Southern cassowary, Casuarius casuarius
- Northern cassowary, Casuarius unappendiculatus

==== Dinornithiformes (moa) † ====
- North Island giant moa, Dinornis novaezealandiae †
- South Island giant moa, Dinornis robustus †
- Bush moa, Anomalopteryx didiformis †
- Eastern moa, Emeus crassus †
- Broad-billed moa, Euryapteryx curtus †
- Heavy-footed moa, Pachyornis elephantopus †
- Mantell's moa, Pachyornis geranoides †
- Crested moa, Pachyornis australis †
- Upland moa, Megalapteryx didinus †

==== Aepyornithiformes (elephant birds) † ====
- Hildebrandt's elephant bird, Aepyornis hildebrandti †
- Giant elephant bird, Aepyornis maximus †
- Lesser elephant bird, Mullerornis modestus †

==== Apterygiformes (kiwi) ====
- Southern brown kiwi, Apteryx australis
  - Stewart Island tokoeka, Apteryx australis lawryi
  - Fiordland tokoeka, Apteryx australis australis
- Great spotted kiwi, Apteryx haastii
- North Island brown kiwi, Apteryx mantelli
- Little spotted kiwi, Apteryx owenii
  - North Island little spotted kiwi, Apteryx owenii iredalei †
  - South Island little spotted kiwi, Apteryx owenii owenii
- Okarito kiwi, Apteryx rowi

==== Rheiformes (rheas) ====
- Greater rhea, Rhea americana
  - American rhea, Rhea americana americana
  - Intermediate rhea, Rhea americana intermedia
  - Argentine rhea, Rhea americana albescens
  - Paraguayan rhea, Rhea americana nobilis
  - Brodkorb's rhea, Rhea americana araneipes
- Lesser rhea, Rhea pennata
  - Darwin's rhea, Rhea pennata pennata
  - Garlepp's rhea, Rhea pennata garleppi
  - Puna rhea, Rhea pennata tarapacensis

=== Neognathae ===
==== Galliformes (landfowl) ====
- New Caledonian giant scrubfowl, Sylviornis neocaledoniae †
- Noble megapode, Megavitiornis altirostris †
- Viti Levu scrubfowl, Megapodius amissus †

==== Anseriformes (waterfowl) ====
- Mihirung, Genyornis newtoni †

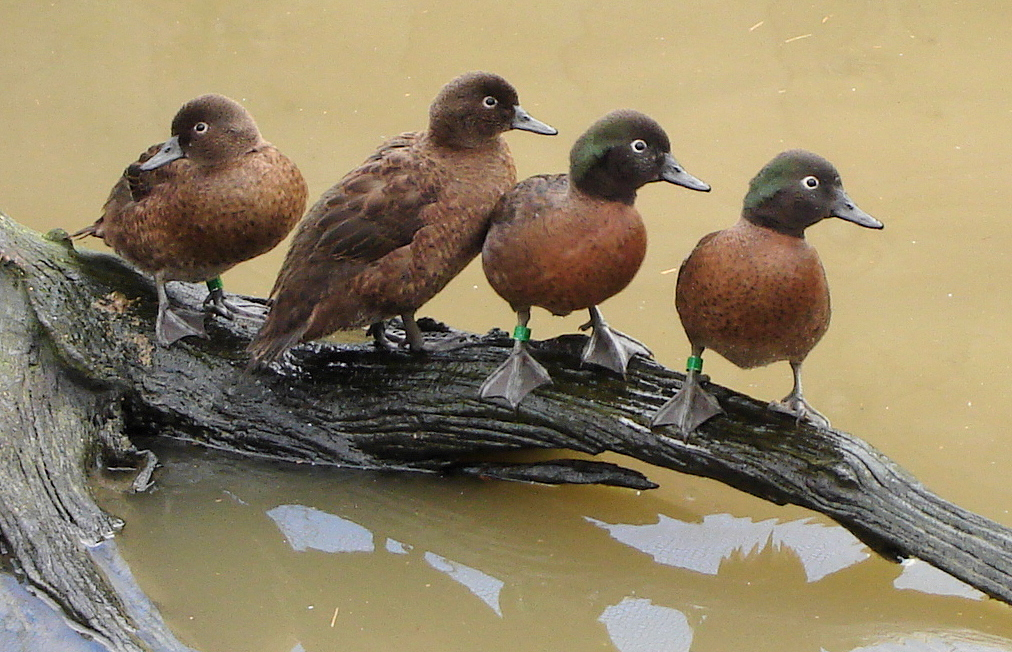
Campbell teal

- Amsterdam wigeon, Mareca marecula †
- Bermuda flightless duck, Anas pachyscelus †
- Auckland Island teal, Anas aucklandica
- Campbell teal, Anas nesiotis
- Eaton's pintail, Anas eatoni
- Finsch's duck, Chenonetta finschi †
- Steamer ducks
  - Fuegian steamer duck, Tachyeres pteneres
  - Falkland steamer duck, Tachyeres brachypterus
  - Chubut steamer duck, Tachyeres leucocephalus
- Moa-nalo †
  - Turtle-jawed moa-nalo, Chelychelynechen quassus †
  - Small-billed moa-nalo, Ptaiochen pau †
  - O'ahu moa-nalo, Thambetochen xanion †
  - Maui Nui large-billed moa-nalo, Thambetochen chauliodous †
- Nēnē-nui, Branta hylobadistes † (possibly flightless or very weak flier)
- Giant Hawaiʻi goose, Branta rhuax †
- California flightless sea-duck or Law's diving goose, Chendytes lawi †
- Kaua'i mole duck, Talpanas lippa †
- New Zealand goose, Cnemiornis gracilis and C. calcitrans †

==== Aegotheliformes (owlet-nightjars) ====
- New Zealand owlet-nightjar, Aegotheles novaezealandiae †

==== Mesitornithiformes (mesites) ====
- Brown mesite Mesitornis unicolor (possibly flightless, has not been seen flying)

==== Columbiformes (pigeons, doves) ====
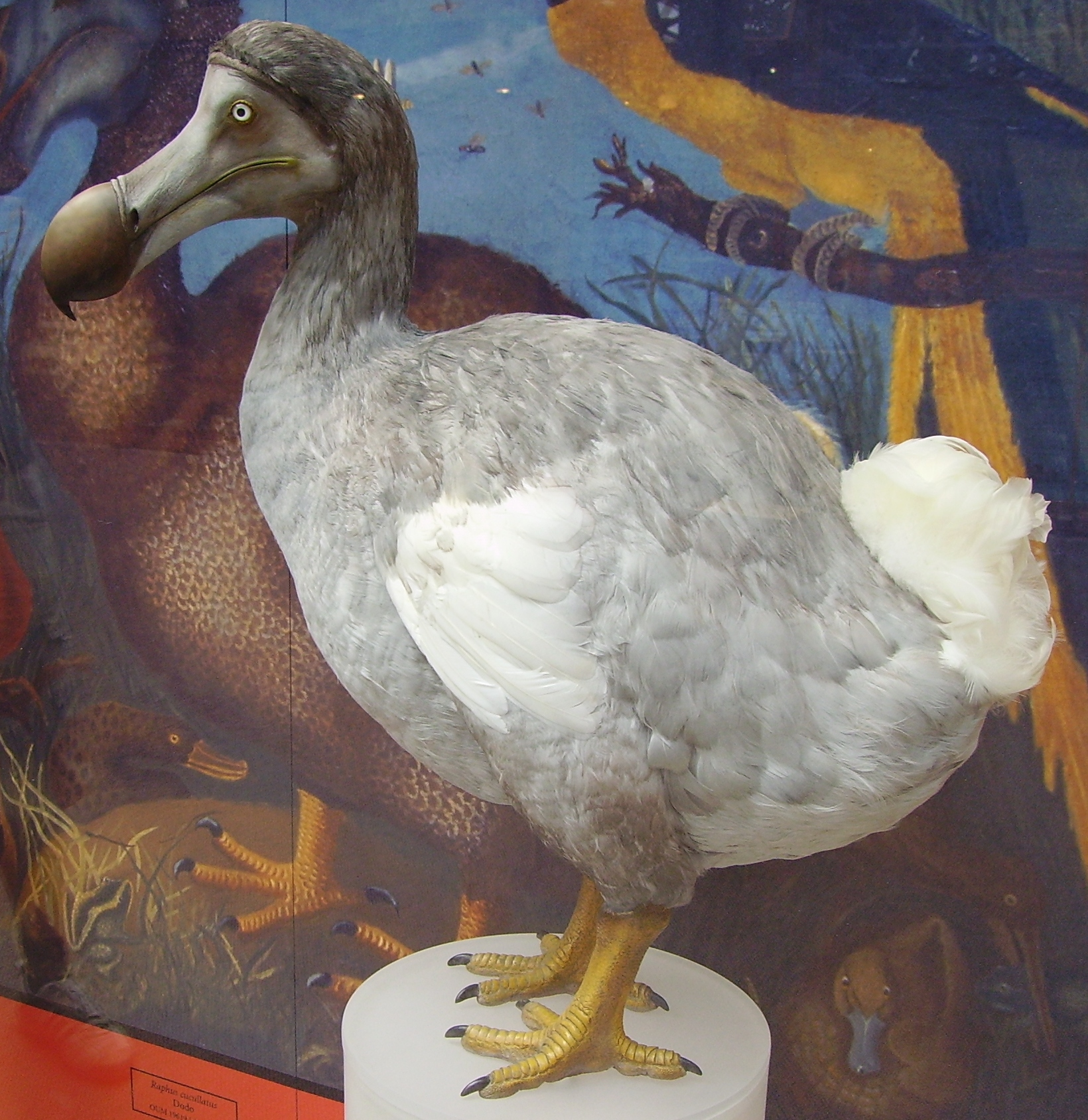
Dodo

- Dodo, Raphus cucullatus †
- Rodrigues solitaire, Pezophaps solitaria †
- Viti Levu giant pigeon, Natunaornis gigoura †
- Saint Helena dove, Dysmoropelia dekarchiskos †
- Henderson ground dove, Gallicolumba leonpascoi †

==== Gruiformes (cranes, rails, and coots) ====
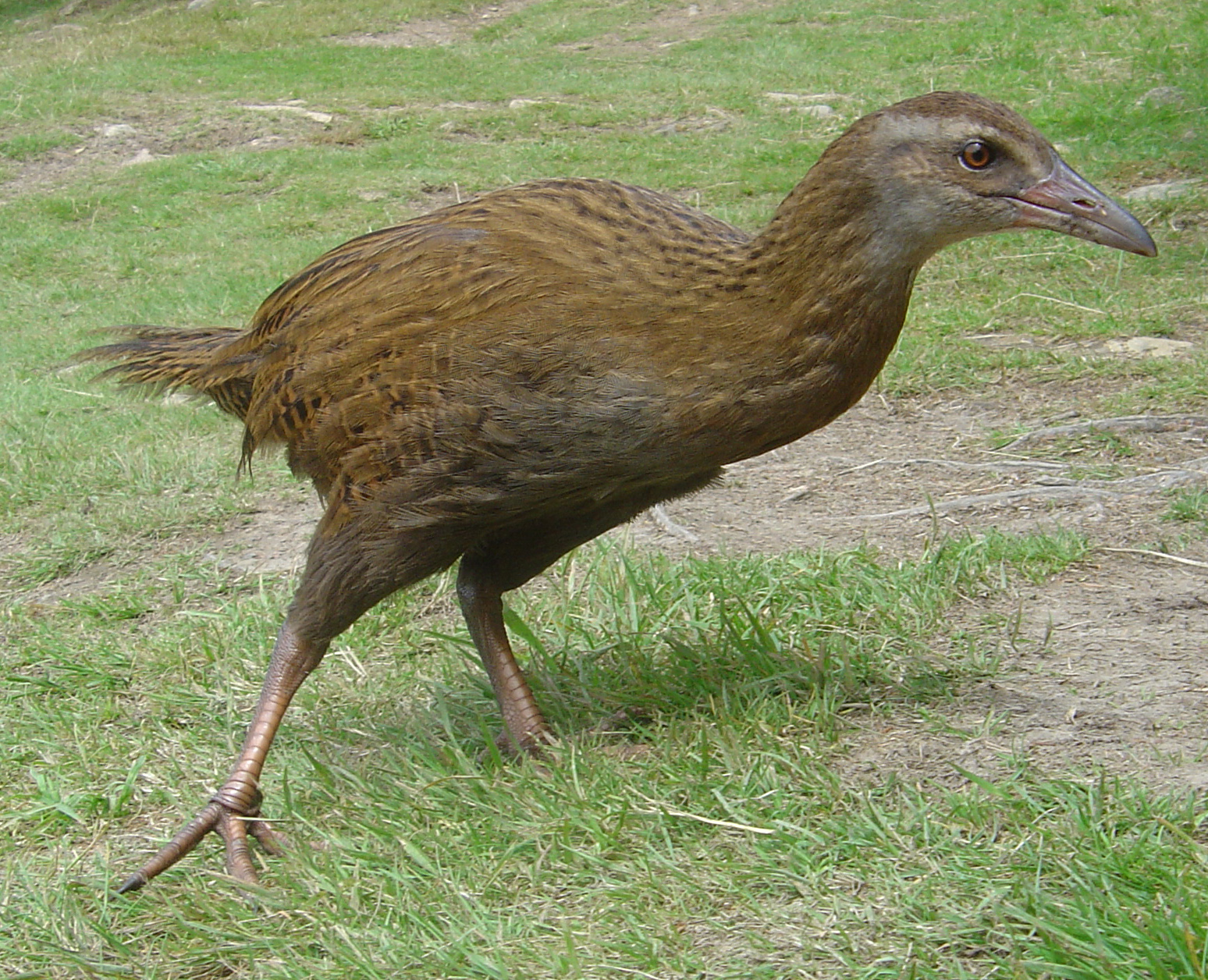
Weka

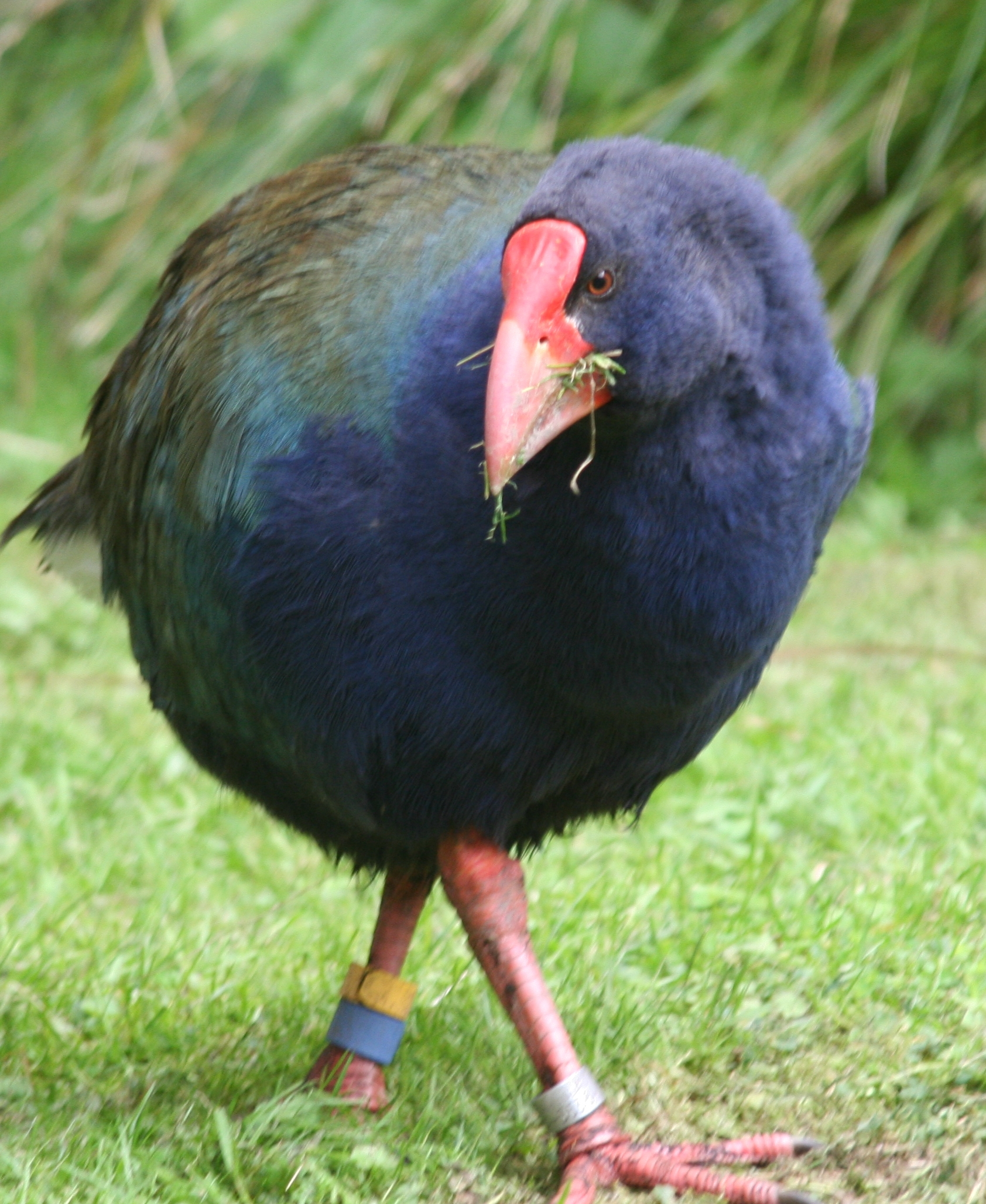
Takahē stride

- Cuban flightless crane, Grus cubensis †
- Red rail, Aphanapteryx bonasia †
- Rodrigues rail, Erythromachus leguati †
- Woodford's rail, Hypotaenidia woodfordi (most likely flightless)
- Bar-winged rail, Hypotaenidia poeciloptera † (probably flightless)
- Weka, Gallirallus australis
- New Caledonian rail, Gallirallus lafresnayanus (likely †)
- Lord Howe woodhen, Gallirallus sylvestris
- Calayan rail, Gallirallus calayanensis
- Pink-legged rail, Gallirallus insignis
- Guam rail, Gallirallus owstoni
- Roviana rail, Gallirallus rovianae (flightless, or almost so)
- Tahiti rail, Gallirallus pacificus †
- Dieffenbach's rail, Gallirallus dieffenbachii †
- Wake Island rail, Gallirallus wakensis †
- numerous other unnamed Gallirallus rails from various Pacific islands
- Chatham rail, Cabalus modestus †
- Snoring rail, Aramidopsis plateni
- Invisible rail, Habroptila wallacii
- New Guinea flightless rail, Megacrex inepta
- Aldabra (white-throated) rail, Dryolimnas (cuvieri) aldabranus
- Réunion rail, Dryolimnas augusti †
- Sauzier's wood rail or Cheke's wood rail, Dryolimnas chekei †
- Inaccessible Island rail, Atlantisia rogersi
- Saint Helena rail, Aphanocrex podarces †
- Ascension crake, Mundia elpenor †
- Saint Helena crake, Porzana astrictocarpus †
- Laysan rail, Porzana palmeri †
- Hawaiian rail, Porzana sandwichensis †
- Small Maui crake, Porzana keplerorum †
- Liliput crake, Porzana menehune †
- Great Oʻahu crake, Porzana ralphorum †
- Great Maui crake, Porzana severnsi †
- Small Oʻahu crake, Porzana ziegleri †
- Kosrae crake, Porzana monasa †
- Henderson crake, Porzana atra
- Mangaia crake, Porzana rua †
- Tahiti crake, Porzana nigra †
- numerous other unnamed Porzana crakes from various Pacific islands
- Lord Howe swamphen, Porphyrio albus †
- North Island takahē, Porphyrio mantelli †
- Takahē, Porphyrio hochstetteri
- Samoan woodhen, Gallinula pacifica
- Makira woodhen, Gallinula silvestris
- Tristan moorhen, Gallinula nesiotis †
- Gough Island moorhen, Gallinula comeri
- Tasmanian native hen, Tribonyx mortierii
- Giant coot, Fulica gigantea (adults only; immature birds can fly)
- Hawkins' rail, Diaphorapteryx hawkinsi †
- Snipe-rail, Capellirallus karamu †
- Antillean cave rail, Nesotrochis debooyi †
- Hispaniolan cave rail, Nesotrochis steganinos †
- Cuban cave rail, Nesotrochis picapicensis †
- Adzebills, Aptornis otidiformis and A. defossor †
- Auckland rail, Lewinia muelleri (possibly flightless)

==== Podicipediformes (grebes) ====
- Junín grebe, Podiceps taczanowskii
- Titicaca grebe, Rollandia microptera
- Atitlán grebe, Podilymbus gigas † (reportedly flightless)

==== Charadriiformes (shorebirds and allies) ====
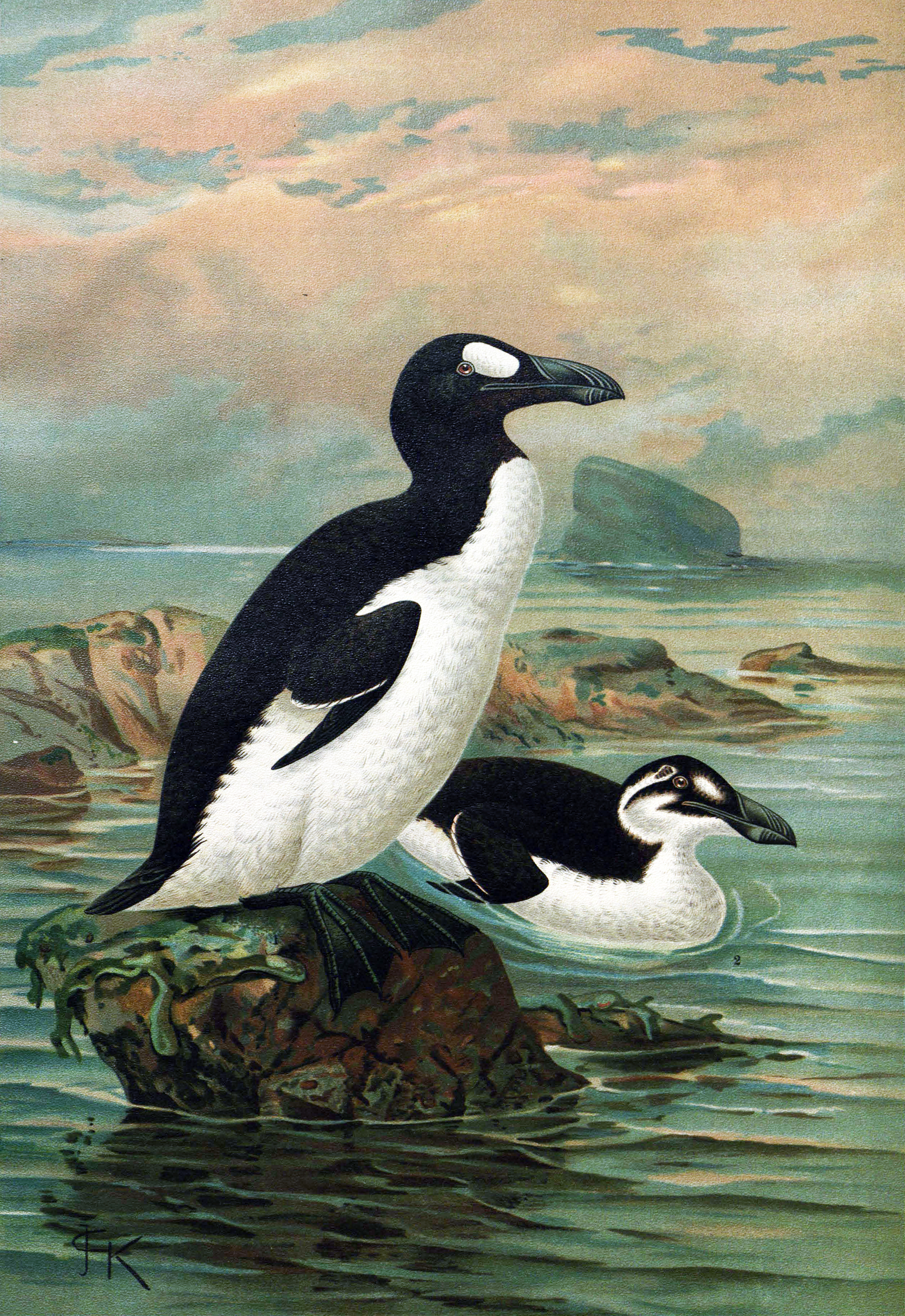
Great auk †

- Great auk, Pinguinus impennis †

==== Sphenisciformes (penguins) ====
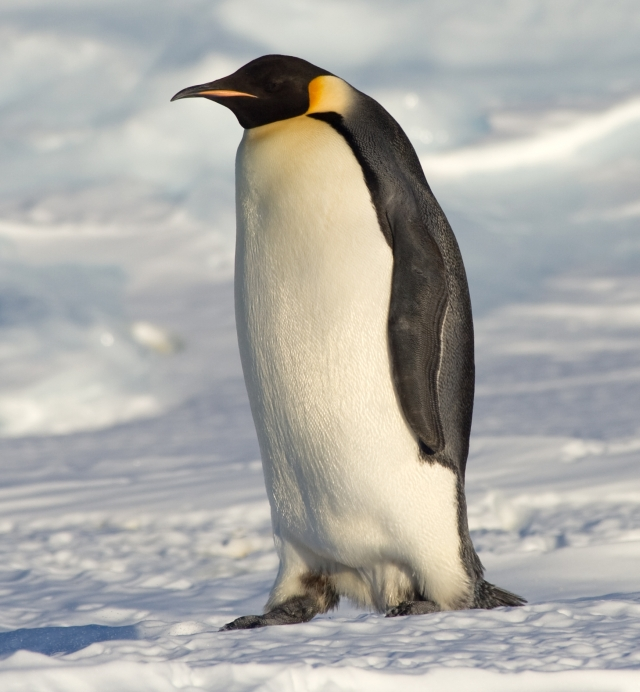
Emperor penguin

- Emperor penguin, Aptenodytes forsteri
- King penguin, Aptenodytes patagonicus
- Adélie penguin, Pygoscelis adeliae
- Chinstrap penguin, Pygoscelis antarctica
- Gentoo penguin, Pygoscelis papua
- Little blue penguin, Eudyptula minor
- Magellanic penguin, Spheniscus magellanicus
- Humboldt penguin, Spheniscus humboldti
- Galapagos penguin, Spheniscus mendiculus
- African penguin, Spheniscus demersus
- Yellow-eyed penguin, Megadyptes antipodes
- Waitaha penguin, Megadyptes waitaha
- Fiordland penguin, Eudyptes pachyrhynchus
- Snares penguin, Eudyptes robustus
- Erect-crested penguin, Eudyptes sclateri
- Northern rockhopper penguin, Eudyptes moseleyi
- Southern rockhopper penguin, Eudyptes chrysocome
- Royal penguin, Eudyptes schlegeli
- Macaroni penguin, Eudyptes chrysolophus
- Chatham penguin, Eudyptes warhami †

==== Suliformes (boobies, cormorants and allies) ====
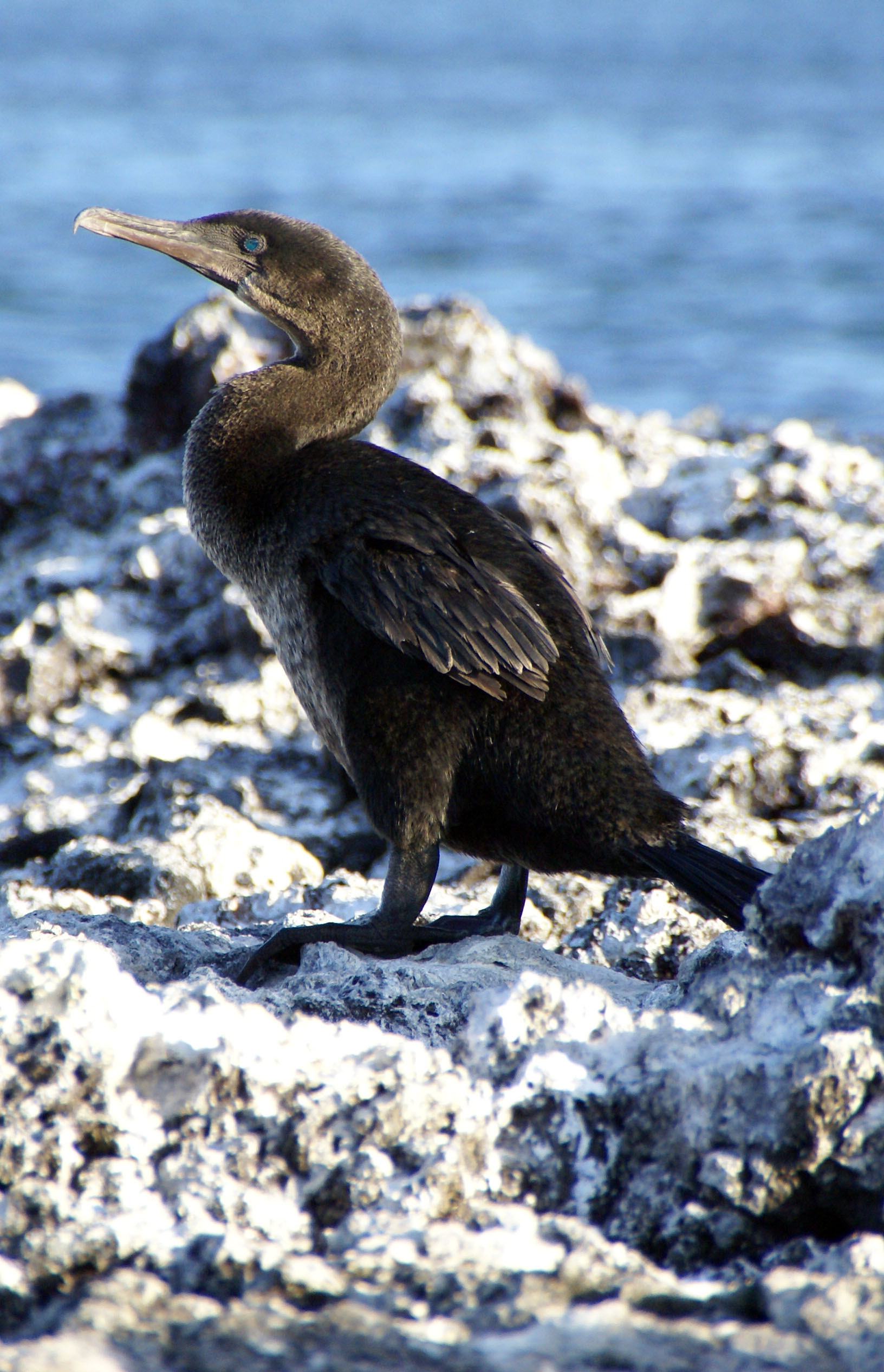
Flightless cormorant

- Flightless cormorant, Nannopterum harrisi

==== Pelecaniformes (pelicans, herons, ibises and allies) ====
- Ascension night heron, Nycticorax olsoni †
- Jamaican ibis, Xenicibis xymphithecus †
- Hawaiian flightless ibises, Apteribis glenos and A. brevis †

==== Strigiformes (owls) ====
- Cuban giant owl, Ornimegalonyx spp. † (possibly flightless)
- Cretan owl, Athene cretensis † (possibly flightless)
- Andros Island barn owl, Tyto pollens † (possibly flightless)

==== Bucerotiformes (hornbills and hoopoes) ====
- Saint Helena hoopoe, Upupa antaios †

==== Falconiformes (falcons and caracaras) ====
- Jamaican caracara, Caracara tellustris †

==== Psittaciformes (parrots) ====
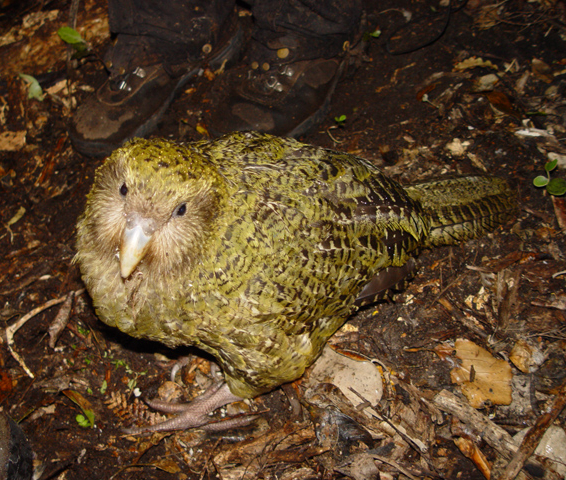
Kākāpō

- Kākāpō, Strigops habroptilus

==== Passeriformes (perching birds) ====
- Lyall's wren, Xenicus lyalli †
- Long-billed wren, Dendroscansor decurvirostris †
- North Island stout-legged wren, Pachyplichas jagmi †
- South Island stout-legged wren, Pachyplichas yaldwyni †
- some Scytalopus tapaculos (possibly flightless, never seen flying)
- Long-legged bunting, Emberiza alcoveri †
