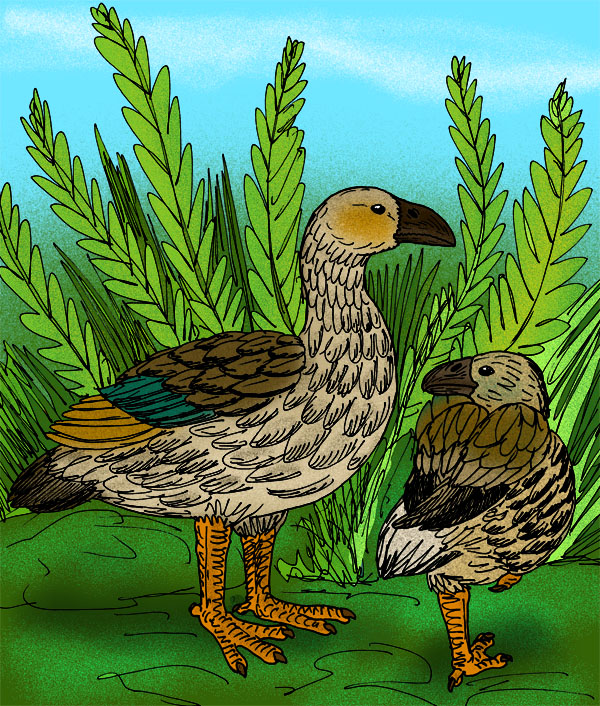
- Reconstruction of species’ appearance: small-billed moa-nalo (right), Maui Nui large-billed moa-nalo (left)

Scientific classification
- Kingdom: Animalia
- Phylum: Chordata
- Class: Aves
- Order: Anseriformes
- Family: Anatidae
- Genus: †Ptaiochen; Olson & James, 1991
- Species: †P. pau

Binomial name
- †Ptaiochen pau Olson & James 1991

Synonyms
- "Maui Thambetochen sp. B" Olson and James, 1984

= Small-billed moa-nalo =

Small-billed moa-nalo Temporal range: Holocene

Extinct species of bird

The small-billed moa-nalo (Ptaiochen pau), also known as the stumbling moa-nalo, is a species of moa-nalo, one of a group of extinct, flightless, large goose-like ducks, which evolved in the Hawaiian Islands of the North Pacific Ocean. It was described in 1991 from subfossil material collected in September 1982 by Storrs Olson, Helen James and others, from the Auwahi Cave on the southern slopes of Haleakalā, on the island of Maui.

== Etymology ==
The generic name Ptaiochen links the Greek ptaio ("stumble"), with chen ("goose"), alluding to a fancied propensity of the species to fall into holes (thereby becoming part of the fossil record). The specific epithet is from the Hawaiian pau ("finished" or "destroyed"), referring to its extinction.

== Description ==
The species was similar to moa-nalo in the genus Thambetochen in having bony, tooth-like projections on the jaws. However, it differed in other aspects of skull morphology, such as in having a proportionately shorter and deeper rostrum (though nothing like as deep as that of the turtle-jawed moa-nalo of Kauai), a more rounded cranium, and in lacking impressions of salt-glands.

== Distribution ==
Subfossil remains have been found only at altitudes of over 1,100 m (3,610 ft) on Haleakalā, from the Auwahi Cave at 1,145 m (3,760 ft) to the upper Kipahulu Valley at 1,860 m (6,100 ft), being replaced at lower levels by the larger Maui Nui large-billed moa-nalo.
