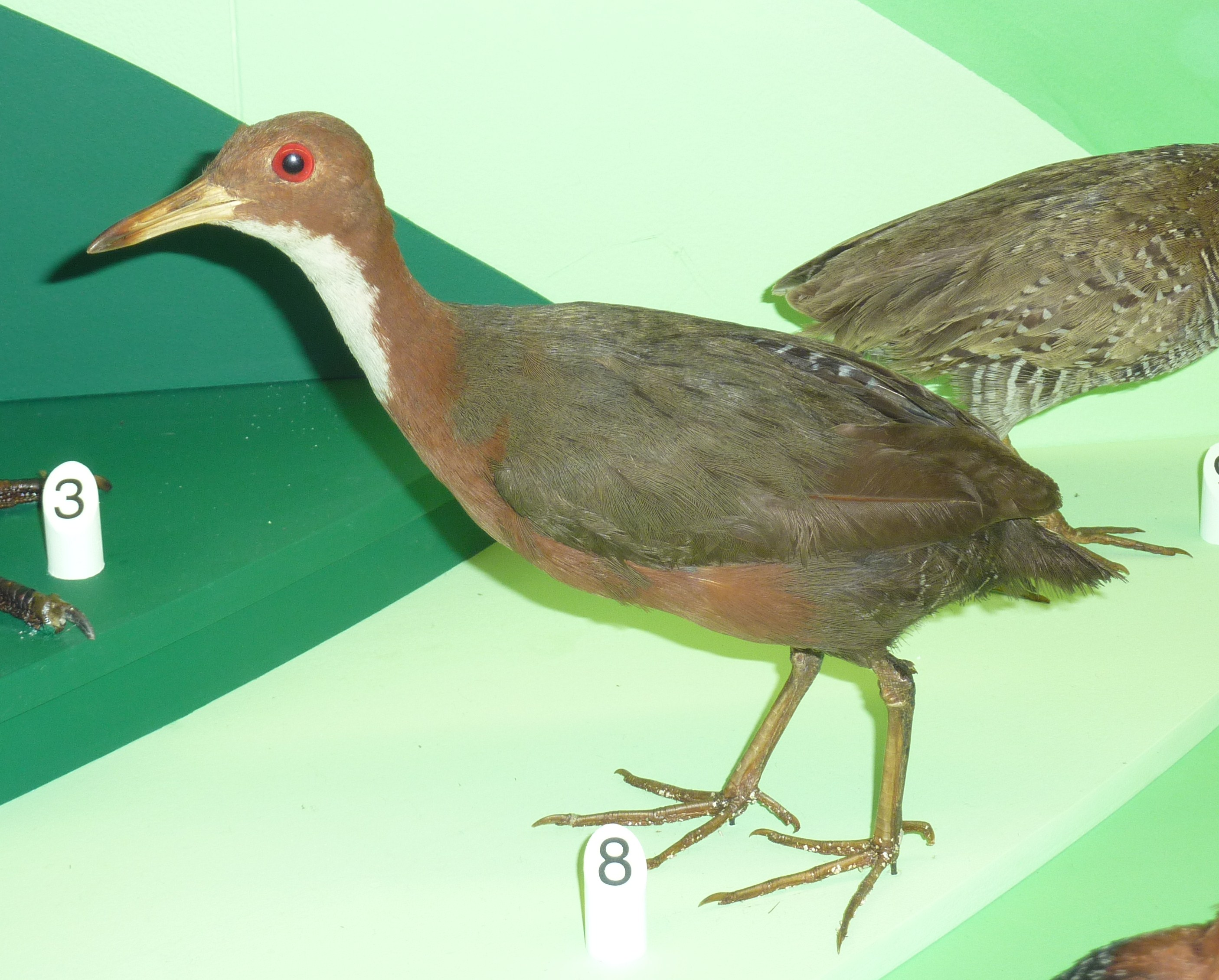
- White-throated rail (Dryolimnas cuvieri)

Scientific classification
- Kingdom: Animalia
- Phylum: Chordata
- Class: Aves
- Order: Gruiformes
- Family: Rallidae
- Genus: Dryolimnas; Sharpe, 1893

Type species
- Rallus cuvieri Pucheran, 1845

Species
- 1 living, 2 species and 1 subspecies recently extinct

= Dryolimnas =

Dryolimnas Temporal range: Pleistocene–Present

Genus of birds

The genus Dryolimnas comprises birds in the rail family. The Réunion rail, a member of this genus, became extinct in the 17th century. The white-throated rail of Aldabra is the last surviving flightless bird in the western Indian Ocean. They are mostly found on Malabar Island, but can also be found on Polymnieli Island and other islands.

Though much larger, the skeletons of these rails show similarities to the rails of the genus Lewinia. Therefore, the two genera were lumped at times. This has been supported by DNA evidence, which finds strong support for a clade containing Crex, Lewinina, Dryolimnas, and the Snoring rail.

== Species ==
- White-throated rail or Cuvier's rail, Dryolimnas cuvieri
  - Aldabra white-throated rail, Dryolimnas cuvieri aldabranus
  - †Assumption white-throated rail, Dryolimnas cuvieri abbotti - extinct (early 20th century)
- †Réunion rail, Dryolimnas augusti - extinct (late 17th century)
- †Cheke's wood rail, Dryolimnas chekei - extinct (mid 17th century) (Note: Previously mentioned as an undescribed extinct taxon and provisionally named Sauzier′s wood-rail or Dryolimnas sp., until it was described as new species in 2019. It is known from Mauritius and was originally thought to be an isolated population of D. cuvieri cuvieri, which is a rare vagrant to Mauritius, until analysis of the fossils found it to be a distinct flightless taxon that is likely descended from D. cuvieri. This species may be the "small rail" referred to in the accounts of Dutch explorers, in contrast to the "large rail" which may be the red rail.)
