= Moa-nalo =

Moa-nalo Temporal range: Holocene
- Artist's conception of Chelychelynechen quassus

Scientific classification
- Kingdom: Animalia
- Phylum: Chordata
- Class: Aves
- Order: Anseriformes
- Family: Anatidae
- Subfamily: Anatinae
- Tribe: †Thambetochenini

Genera
- Chelychelynechen; Thambetochen; Ptaiochen

Extinct tribe of birds

The moa-nalo are a group of extinct aberrant, goose-like ducks that lived on the larger Hawaiian Islands, except Hawaiʻi itself, in the Pacific. They were the major herbivores on most of these islands until they became extinct after human settlement.

== Description ==
The moa-nalo (the name literally means "lost fowl"; the plural and the singular are the same) were long unknown to science, having been wiped out before the arrival of James Cook (1778). In the early 1980s, their subfossil remains were discovered in sand dunes on the islands of Molokaʻi and Kauaʻi. Subsequently, bones were found on Maui, Oʻahu, and Lānaʻi, in lava tubes, lake beds, and sinkholes. They represent four species in three genera so far:

- Chelychelynechen quassus (turtle-jawed moa-nalo) from Kauaʻi
- Ptaiochen pau (small-billed moa-nalo) from Maui
- Thambetochen xanion (O'ahu moa-nalo) from Oʻahu
- Thambetochen chauliodous (Maui Nui large-billed moa-nalo) from Maui, Lānaʻi and Molokaʻi (Maui Nui)

Chelychelynechen, meaning turtle-jawed goose, had a large, heavy bill like that of a tortoise, while the other two genera, Thambetochen and Ptaiochen, all had serrations in their bills known as pseudoteeth, similar to those of mergansers. All species were flightless and large, with an average mass of 4–7.5 kg (8.8–16.5 lb).

== Evolution ==
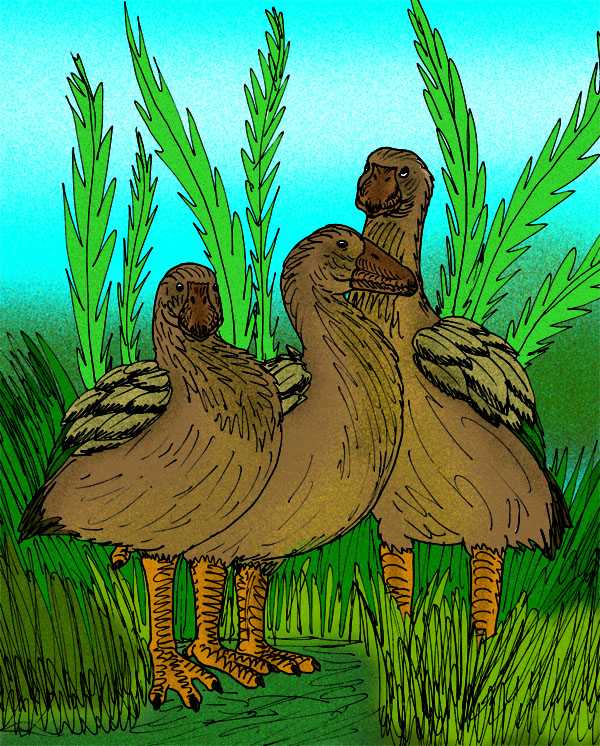
Reconstruction of Thambetochen xanion

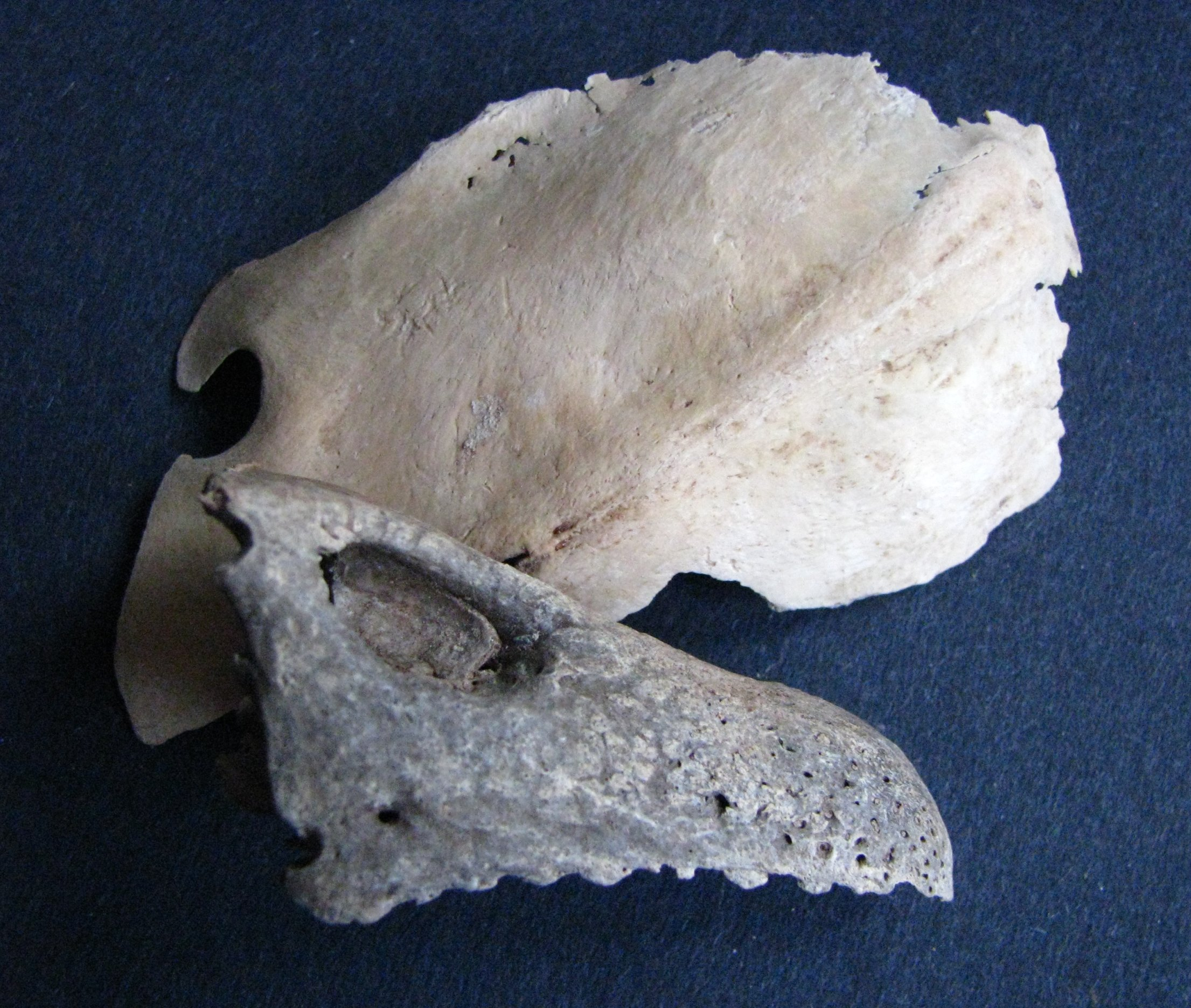
Rostrum and sternum of Thambetochen xanion

Some moa-nalo fossils have been found to contain traces of mitochondrial DNA which were compared to living duck species in order to establish their place in the duck family, Anatidae. Contrary to the expectations of some scientists, the moa-nalo were not related to the large geese (Anserinae), such as the surviving nēnē, but instead to the dabbling ducks of the genus Anas, which includes the mallard. The present DNA analysis' resolution is not high enough to determine their relationships to different species of Anas, but biogeography strongly suggests that their closest living relative is the widespread Pacific black duck.

== Ecology ==
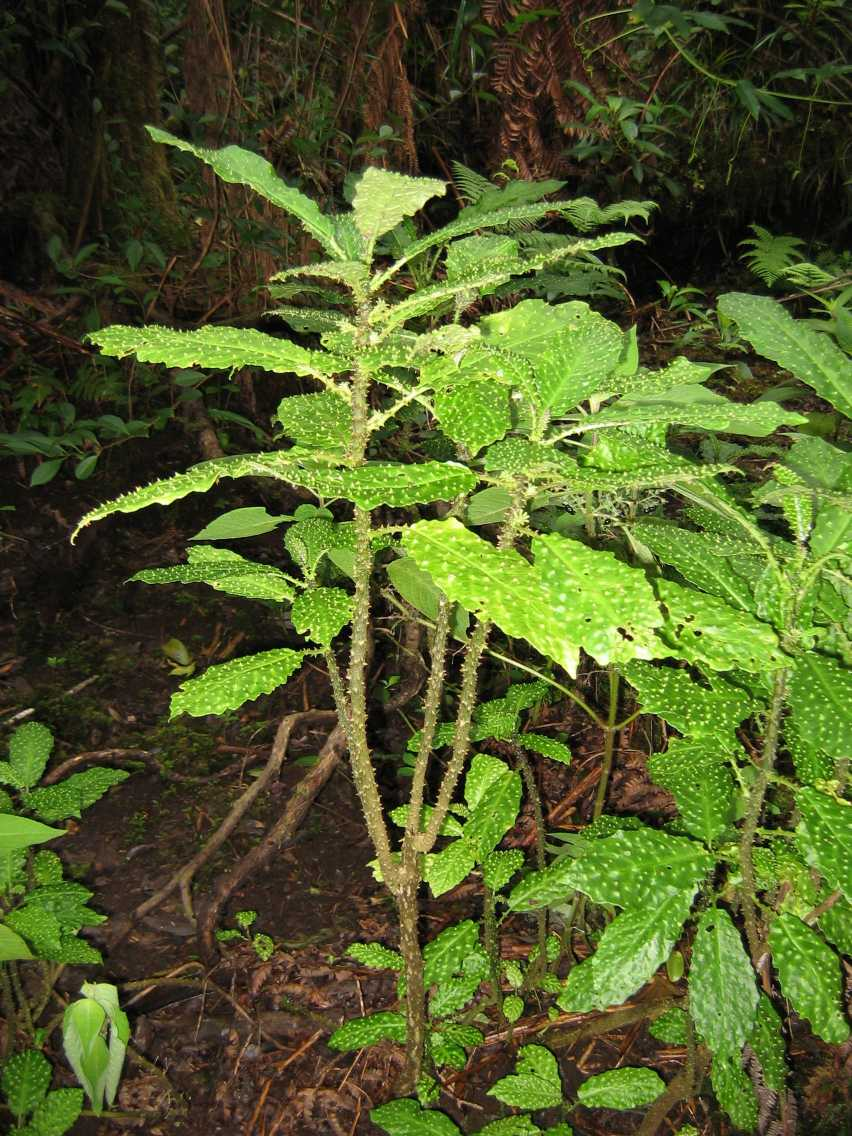
A sapling of Cyanea platyphylla, showing the prickles that probably evolved as a defense against feeding by moa-nalo.

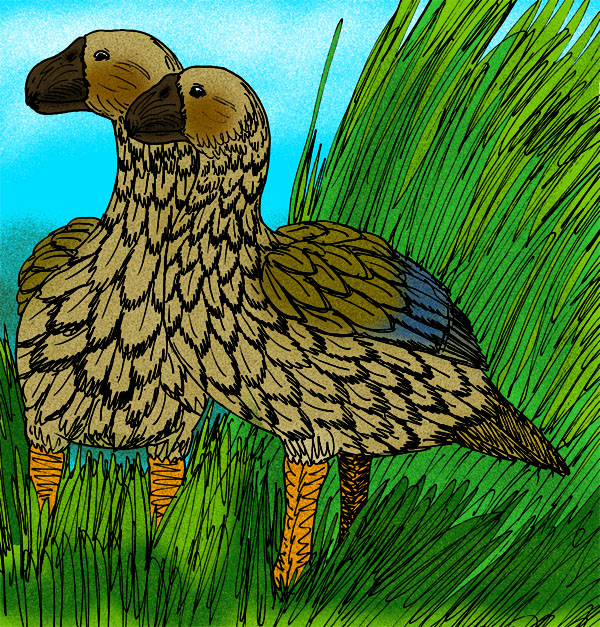
Reconstruction of Chelychelynechen quassus

The unusual bill shape and size of the moa-nalo can be attributed to their role in the ecology of prehistoric Hawaiʻi. A study of coprolites (fossil dung) of Thambetochen chauliodous found in Puʻu Naio Cave on lowland Maui has shown they were folivorous, at least in dry shrub or mesic forest habitats eating particularly fronds from ferns (possibly Asplenium nidus or Dryopteris wallichiana). This conclusion is backed up by the shapes of their beaks. This indicates they were the principal browsers on the island. The presence of prominent spines on the leaves and soft young stems of several Hawaiian lobelioids in the genus Cyanea—unusual in an island flora where such defenses are frequently lost, as in the ʻākala (Hawaiian raspberry)—suggests that the Cyanea evolved these thornlike prickles on new growth because they protect against browsing by the moa-nalo. The moa-nalo themselves filled the niche of herbivore usually filled by mammals such as goats and deer, or the giant tortoises of Galápagos and other archipelagoes. This has implications for the ecology of Hawaiian Islands today, as a major group of species have been lost.

Like island taxa from Mauritius, New Zealand and Polynesia, the moa-nalo were unused to mammals and were easily predated on by hunters or the animals that were introduced and became feral, such as domestic pigs.

== See also ==
- Branta rhuax, an extinct giant species of goose that lived contemporaneously on the island of Hawai'i
- Island gigantism
- Late Quaternary prehistoric birds
- Moa, enormous extinct flightless ratites, formerly the largest herbivores in New Zealand
