= Talaud rail =

Conservation status
- Endangered (IUCN 3.1)

Scientific classification
- Kingdom: Animalia
- Phylum: Chordata
- Class: Aves
- Order: Gruiformes
- Family: Rallidae
- Genus: Gymnocrex
- Species: G. talaudensis

Binomial name
- Gymnocrex talaudensis Lambert, 1998

Species of bird

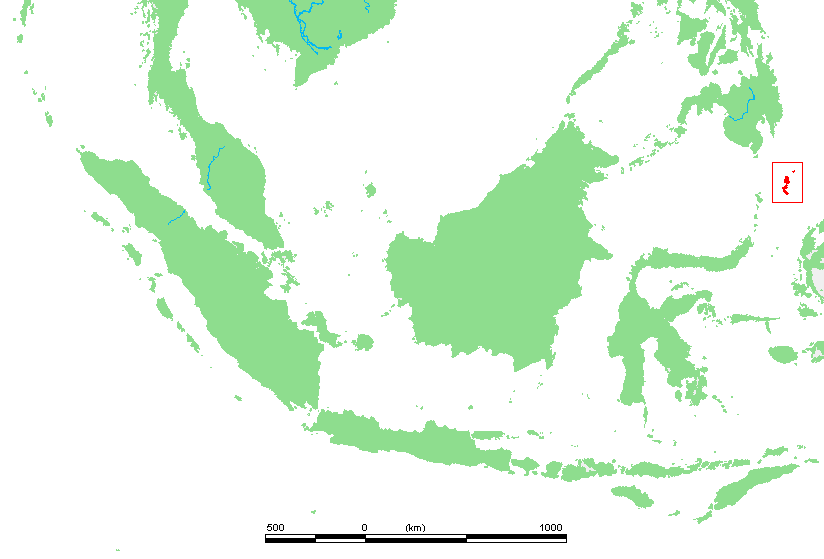
Talaud Islands

The Talaud rail (Gymnocrex talaudensis) is a species of bird in the family Rallidae. It is endemic to the Talaud Islands of Indonesia. Its natural habitats are rivers and swamps. It is threatened by habitat loss.

The species is monotypic.

It is a large and robust rail, measuring around 33–35 cm (13–14 in) in length. its head, neck and breast are maroon-chestnut in color, and the upperparts and wings are greenish-olive.

A call of 15 fast and high pitched "“peet-peet-peet” sound is may come from this bird. A deep “ump-ump-ump” call are said by local people also to come from the Talaud rail.

It is a shy and secretive bird, with its diet and foraging behavior unknown.
