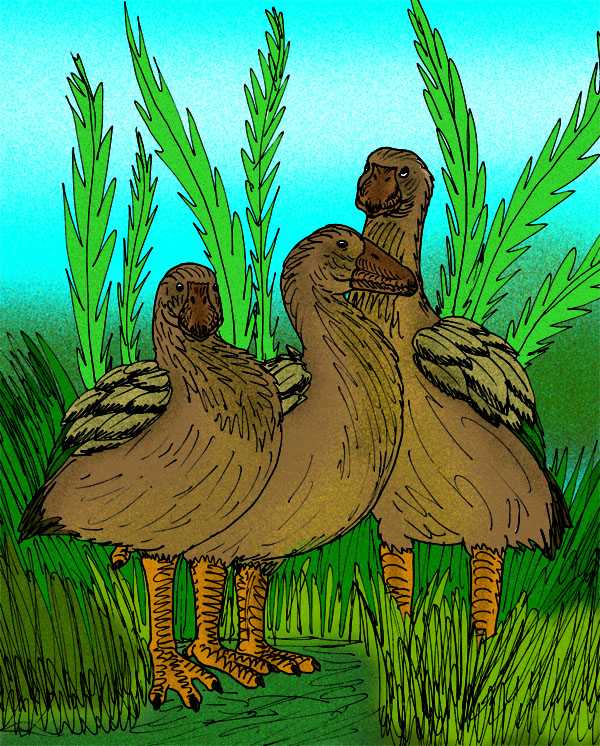
- Reconstruction of species’ appearance

Scientific classification
- Kingdom: Animalia
- Phylum: Chordata
- Class: Aves
- Order: Anseriformes
- Family: Anatidae
- Genus: †Thambetochen
- Species: †T. xanion

Binomial name
- †Thambetochen xanion Olson & James, 1991

= Oʻahu moa-nalo =

Oʻahu moa-nalo Temporal range: Holocene

Extinct species of bird

The Oʻahu moa-nalo (Thambetochen xanion) is one of two species of moa-nalo in the genus Thambetochen. Moa-nalo are a group of extinct, flightless, large goose-like ducks, which evolved in the Hawaiian Islands of the North Pacific Ocean.

== Etymology ==
The specific epithet comes from the Greek xanion (“comb”), referring to the bony, tooth-like projections on the jaws.

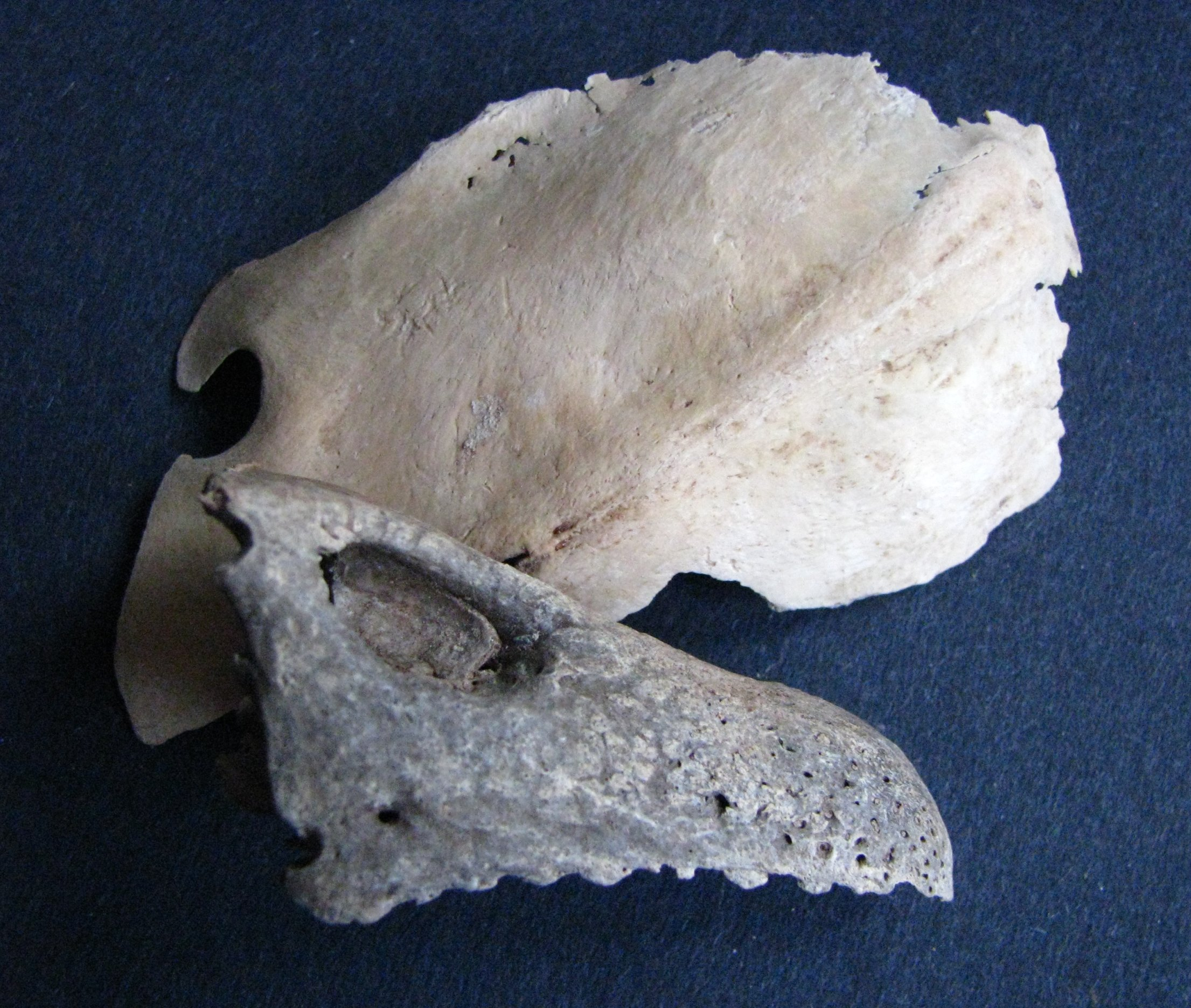
Subfossil remains: sternum (back) and rostrum (front); note the lack of a keel on the sternum, and the bony, tooth-like projections on the rostrum.

== Distribution ==
The species was described in 1991 from subfossil material collected by Storrs Olson, Helen James, Aki Sinoto and Eric Komori, from Barbers Point on the island of Oʻahu. Remains of the bird have also been recovered from Ulupau Head on the same island. It was smaller and less robust than its only congener, the Maui Nui large-billed moa-nalo.
