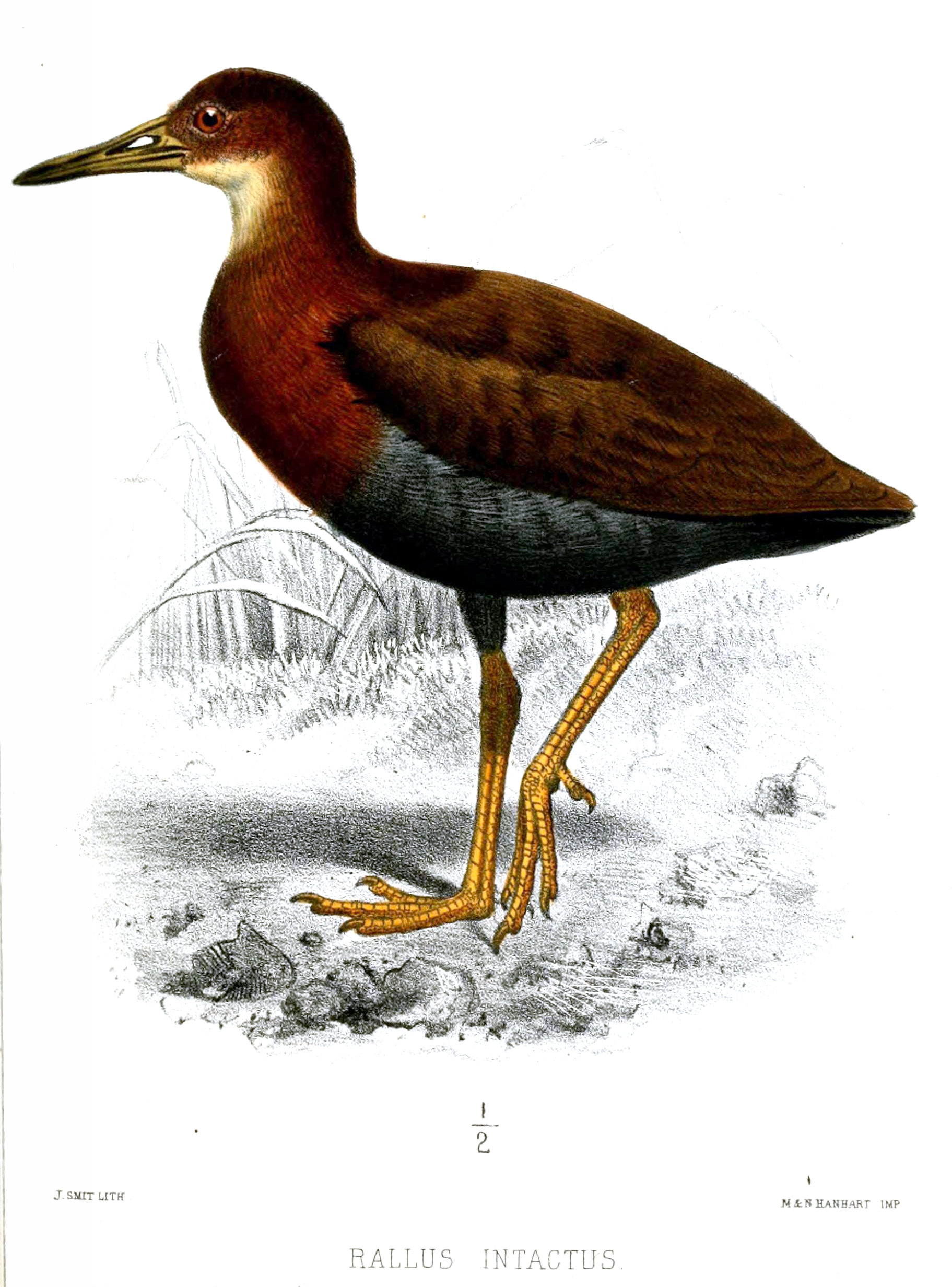
- G. plumbeiventris intactus

Conservation status
- Least Concern (IUCN 3.1)

Scientific classification
- Kingdom: Animalia
- Phylum: Chordata
- Class: Aves
- Order: Gruiformes
- Family: Rallidae
- Genus: Gymnocrex
- Species: G. plumbeiventris

Binomial name
- Gymnocrex plumbeiventris (Gray, 1862)

= Bare-eyed rail =

Species of bird

The bare-eyed rail (Gymnocrex plumbeiventris) is a species of bird in the family Rallidae. It is found in Indonesia and Papua New Guinea. Its natural habitats are subtropical or tropical moist lowland forests and subtropical or tropical moist montane forests.

It has two described subspecies:

- G. p. plumbeiventris
- G. p. hoeveni

It measures 30–33 cm (12–13 in) in length and was estimated to weigh 300 g (11 oz). The individual plumage is variable.

The bare-eyed rail eats insects and probably other small animals.
