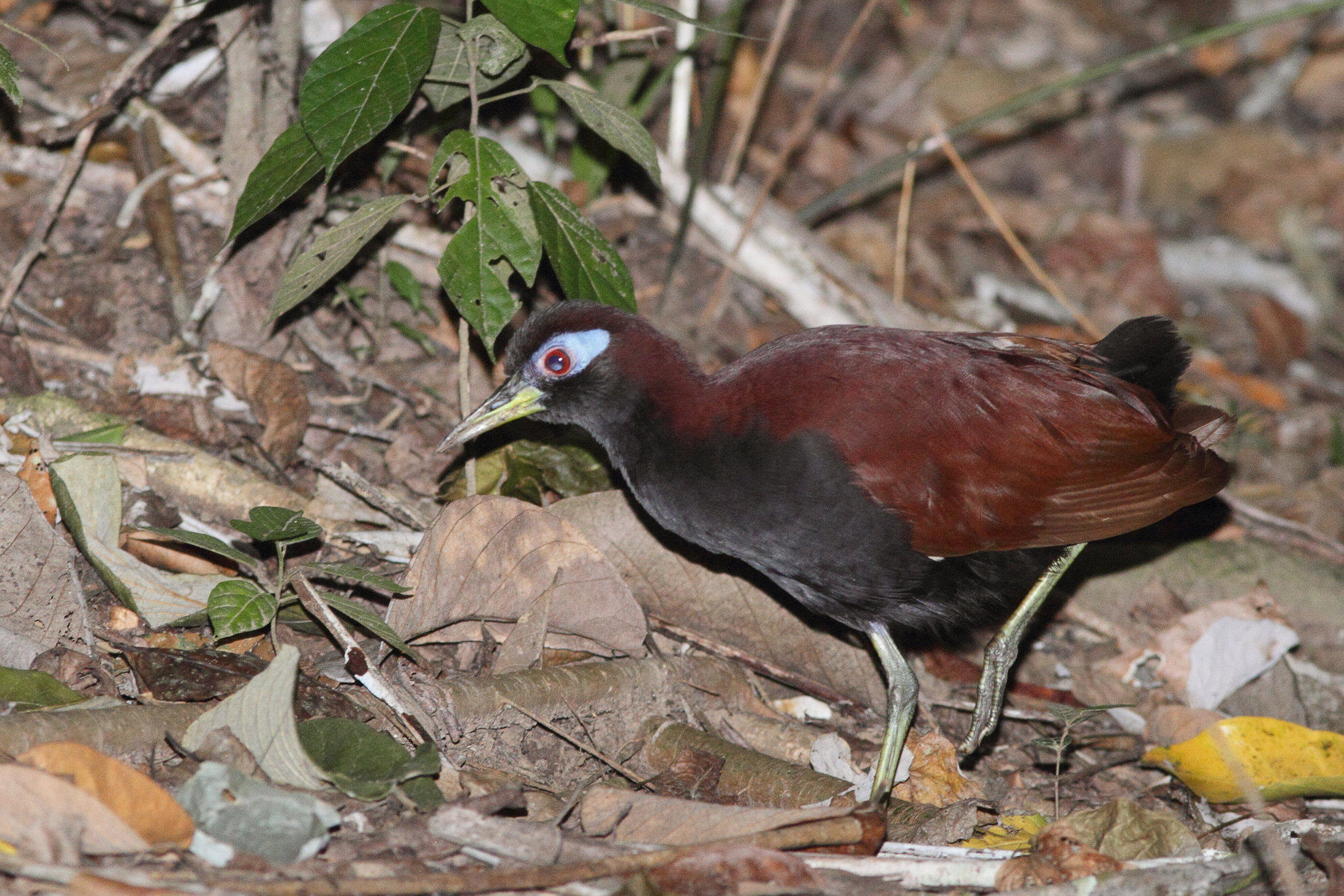

Conservation status
- Least Concern (IUCN 3.1)

Scientific classification
- Kingdom: Animalia
- Phylum: Chordata
- Class: Aves
- Order: Gruiformes
- Family: Rallidae
- Genus: Gymnocrex
- Species: G. rosenbergii

Binomial name
- Gymnocrex rosenbergii (Schlegel, 1866)

= Blue-faced rail =

Species of bird

The blue-faced rail (Gymnocrex rosenbergii), also bald-faced rail or Schlegel's rail, is a species of bird in the family Rallidae. It is endemic to Sulawesi, Indonesia.

Its natural habitats are subtropical or tropical moist lowland forest, subtropical or tropical moist shrubland, and rivers.

As of 2025, the species population size is unknown, but believed to be decreasing due to loss of its forest habitat. Previously, population has been estimated as 3,500-15,000 individuals, but this is a likely underestimate due to difficulties surveying cryptic species.

== Description ==
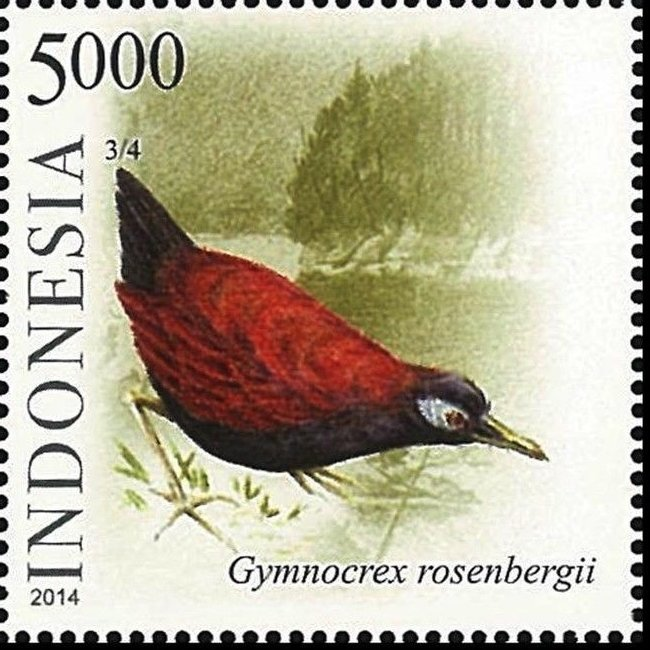
Blue-faced rail on an Indonesian stamp

The blue-faced rail is a 30 cm, medium-sized, secretive, forest rail. It has a conspicuous patch of bare cobalt-blue skin around the eye that gives the bird its distinctive name. The blue-faced rail makes a snoring sound apparently similar to that of the snoring rail, and it also gives off a quiet clucking sound in alarm.

== Diet ==
The blue-faced rail feeds on insects and snails.
