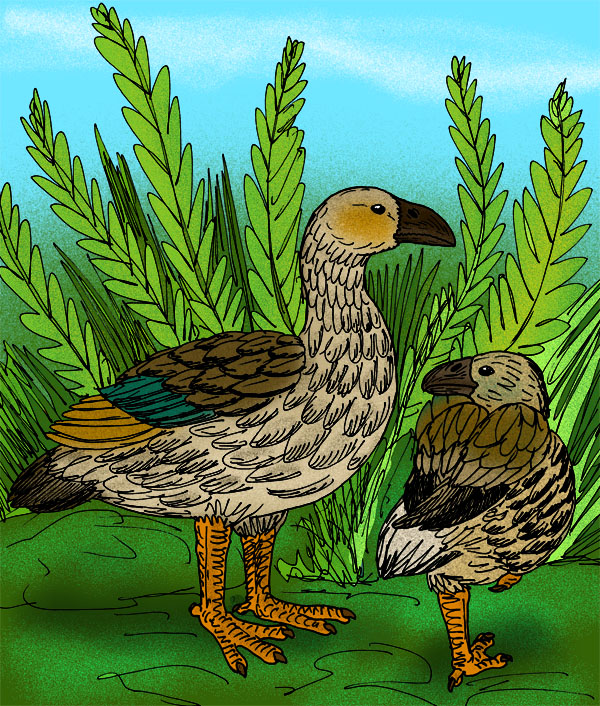
- Reconstruction of species’ appearance: Maui Nui large-billed moa-nalo (left), small-billed moa-nalo (right)

Scientific classification
- Kingdom: Animalia
- Phylum: Chordata
- Class: Aves
- Order: Anseriformes
- Family: Anatidae
- Genus: †Thambetochen
- Species: †T. chauliodous

Binomial name
- †Thambetochen chauliodous Olson & Wetmore, 1976

Synonyms
- "Maui Thambetochen sp. A" Olson and James, 1984

= Maui Nui large-billed moa-nalo =

Maui Nui large-billed moa-nalo Temporal range: Holocene

Extinct species of bird

The Maui Nui large-billed moa-nalo (Thambetochen chauliodous), also known as the Maui Nui moa-nalo, is one of two species of moa-nalo in the genus Thambetochen. Moa-nalo are a group of extinct, flightless, large goose-like ducks, which evolved in the Hawaiian Islands of the North Pacific Ocean.

== Distribution and habitat ==
The genus and species were originally described in 1976 from subfossil material collected from the Moomomi Dunes, on the island of Molokai. Remains of the bird have also been recovered from Ilio Point on Molokai as well as from lava tubes on the southern slopes of the volcanic mountain of Haleakalā on the nearby island of Maui. Both Molokai and Maui are parts of what used to be the much larger prehistoric island of Maui Nui, to which the species appears to have been endemic. The bird evidently shared the island with another moa-nalo—the smaller small-billed moa-nalo—which, from the sites from which its remains have been recovered, appears to have been largely restricted to upland areas over 1,100 m (3,610 ft) in altitude, while the large-billed species occupied the lowlands. It was larger than its only congener, the O'ahu moa-nalo.
