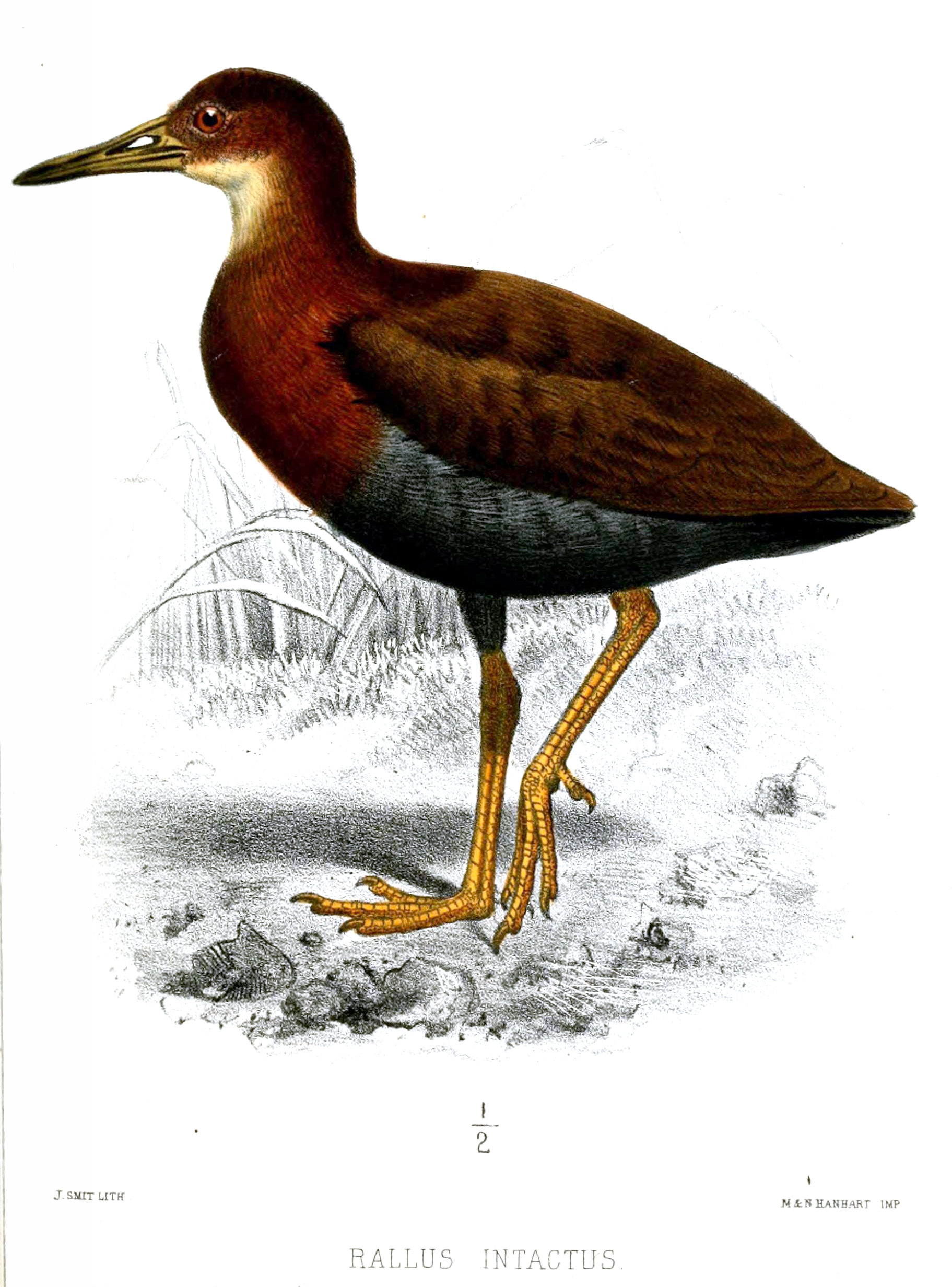
- Bare-eyed rail, Gymnocrex plumbeiventris

Scientific classification
- Kingdom: Animalia
- Phylum: Chordata
- Class: Aves
- Order: Gruiformes
- Family: Rallidae
- Subfamily: Rallinae
- Genus: Gymnocrex; Salvadori, 1875

Species
- see text

= Gymnocrex =

Genus of birds

Gymnocrex is a genus of bird in the rail family, Rallidae.

It contains the following species:

- Bare-eyed rail, Gymnocrex plumbeiventris
- Blue-faced rail or bald-faced rail, Gymnocrex rosenbergii
- Talaud rail, Gymnocrex talaudensis
