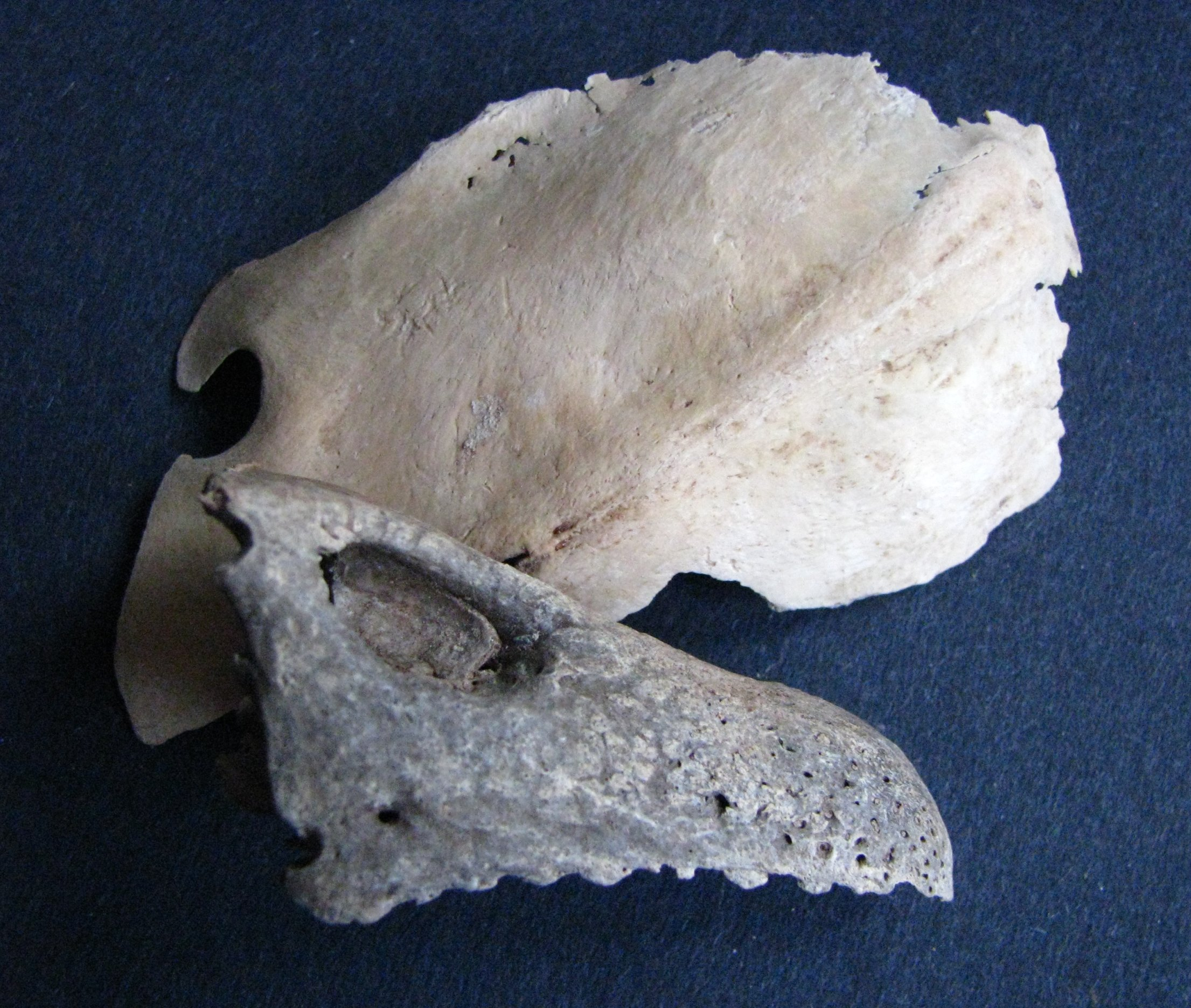
- Rostrum and sternum of T. xanion

Scientific classification
- Kingdom: Animalia
- Phylum: Chordata
- Class: Aves
- Order: Anseriformes
- Family: Anatidae
- Genus: †Thambetochen; Olson & Wetmore, 1976

Species
- T. chauliodous Olson & Wetmore, 1976; T. xanion Olson & James, 1991

= Thambetochen =

Thambetochen Temporal range: Holocene

Extinct genus of ducks

Thambetochen is an extinct genus of moa-nalo duck. It contains two species, the Maui Nui moa-nalo (T. chauliodous) and the smaller O'ahu moa-nalo (T. xanion).

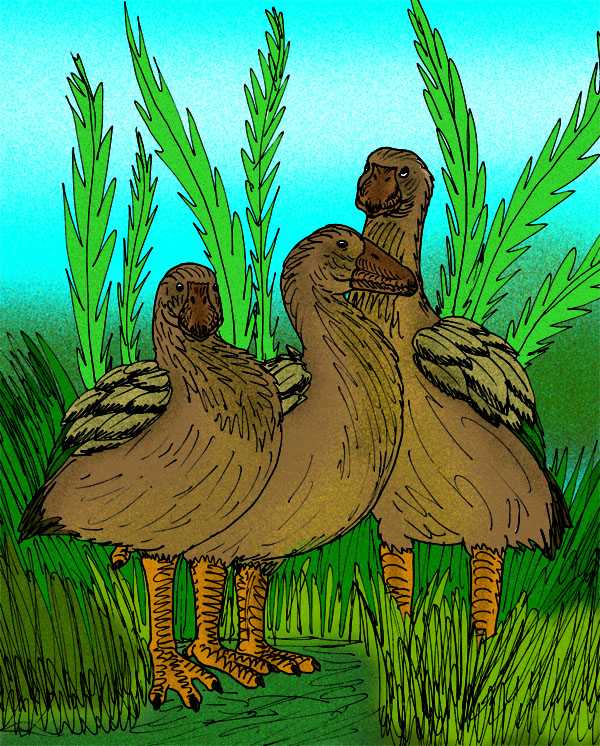
Restoration of T. xanion

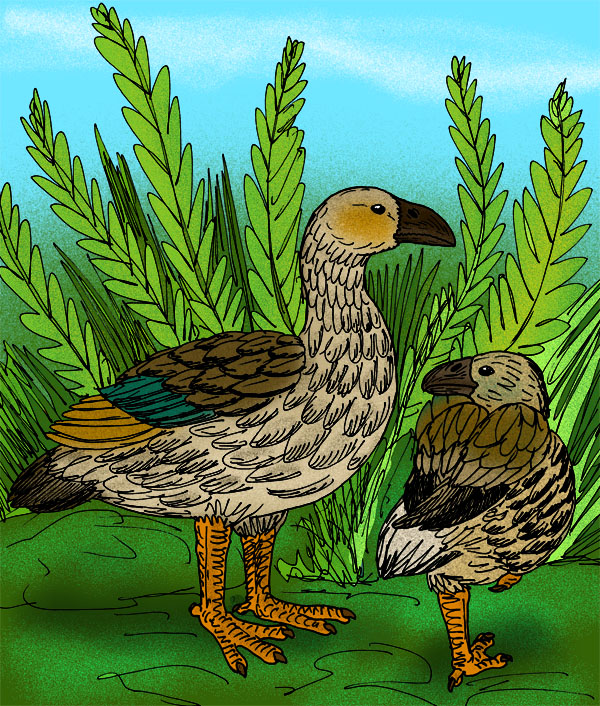
Restoration of T. chauliodous and Ptaiochen pau

The former was found on Maui and Molokai on Hawaii, the latter was found on Oahu. These birds were large, flightless ducks, with robust legs but small wings, which had evolved in isolation, on islands without terrestrial mammals. Their beaks had tooth-like lamellae and their diet was plants which they digested through hindgut fermentation. These birds were likely driven to extinction when the islands were colonised by Polynesians.
