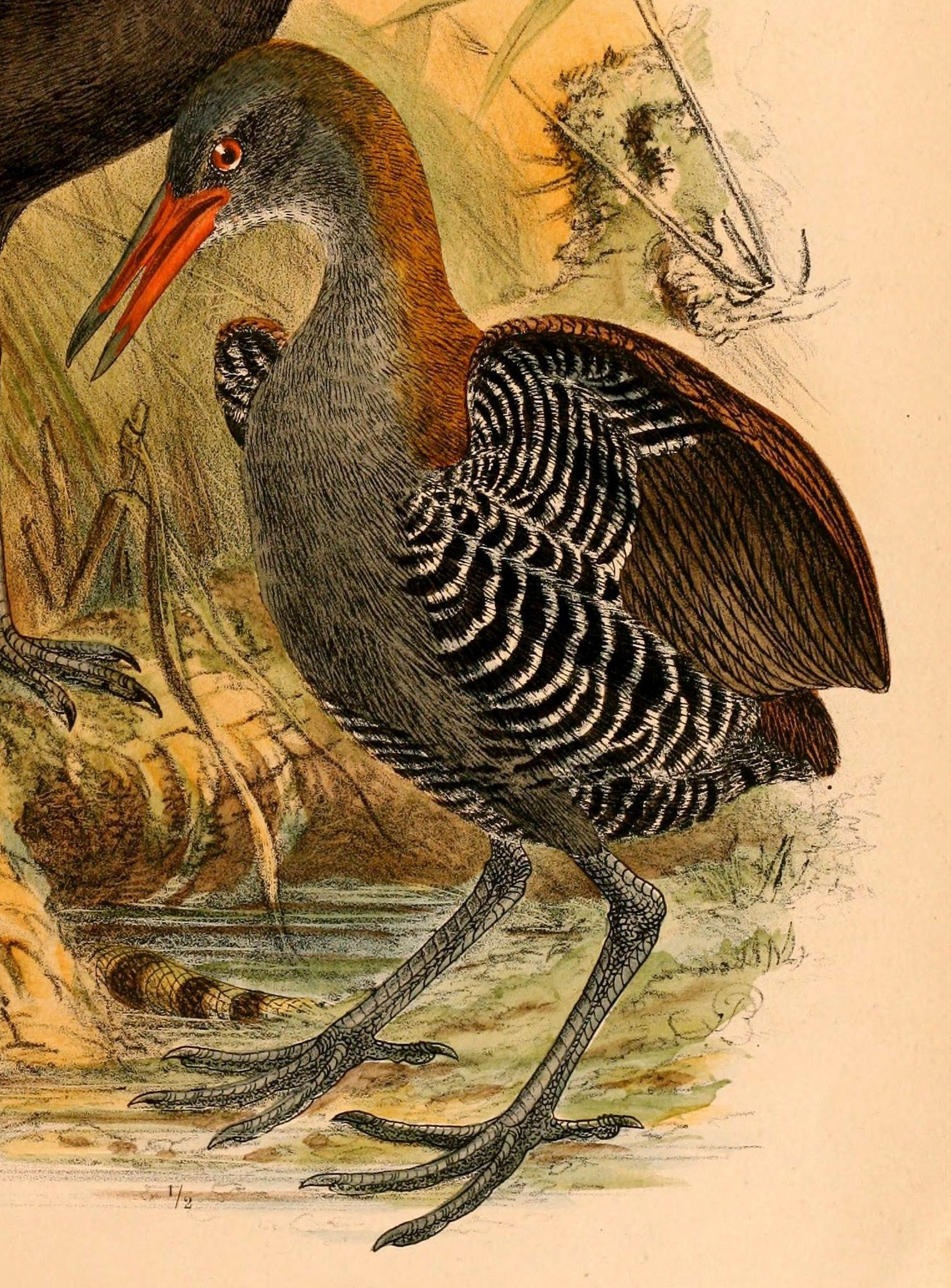
- From The Birds of Celebes and the neighbouring islands, 1898
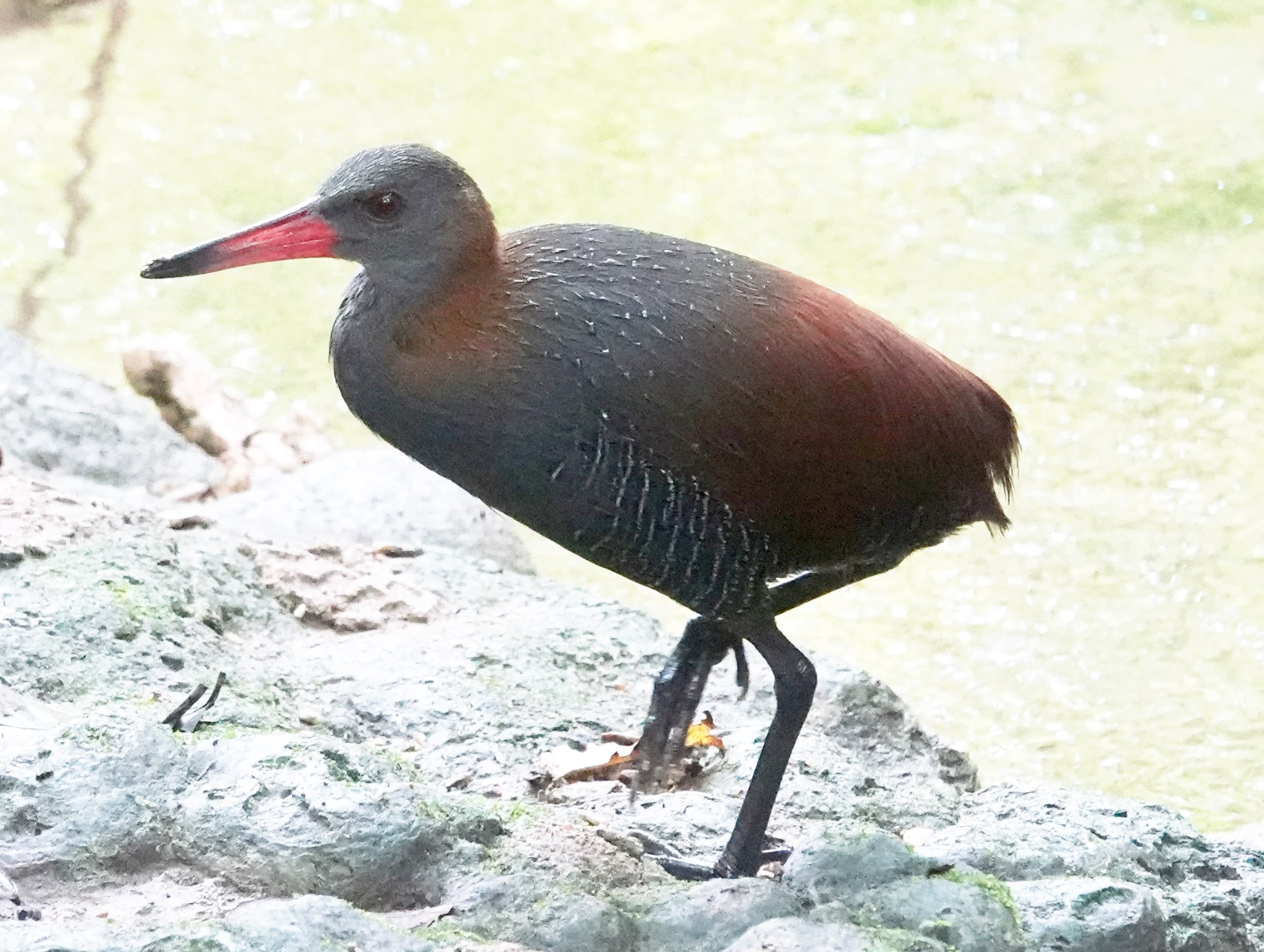

Conservation status
- Vulnerable (IUCN 3.1)

Scientific classification
- Kingdom: Animalia
- Phylum: Chordata
- Class: Aves
- Order: Gruiformes
- Family: Rallidae
- Genus: Aramidopsis; Sharpe, 1893
- Species: A. plateni

Binomial name
- Aramidopsis plateni (Blasius, 1886)
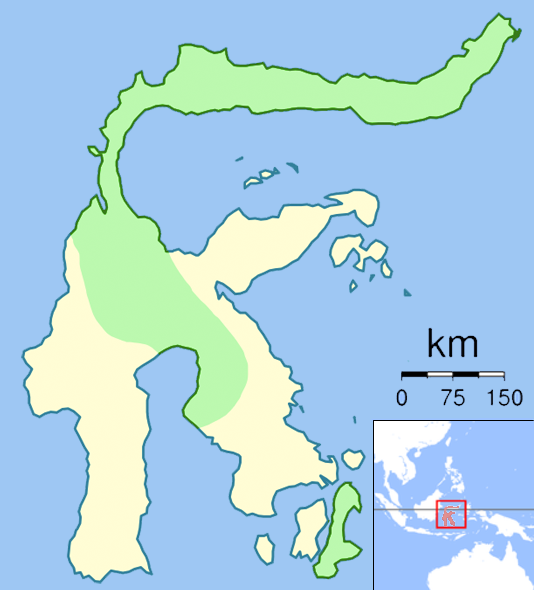
- Approximate resident range Inset shows location of Sulawesi

Synonyms
- Rallus plateni

= Snoring rail =

Species of flightless bird

The snoring rail (Aramidopsis plateni), also known as the Celebes rail or Platen's rail, is a large flightless rail and the only member of the genus Aramidopsis. The species is endemic to Indonesia, and it is found exclusively in dense vegetation in wet areas of Sulawesi and nearby Buton. The rail has grey underparts, a white chin, brown wings and a rufous patch on the hind-neck. The sexes are similar, but the female has a brighter neck patch and a differently coloured bill and iris. The typical call is the snoring: ee-orrrr sound that gives the bird its English name.

Its inaccessible habitat and retiring nature mean that the snoring rail is rarely seen and as a result, little is known of its behaviour. Only the adult plumage has been described, and the breeding behaviour is unrecorded. It feeds on small crabs and probably other small prey such as lizards. Although protected under Indonesian law since 1972, the rail is threatened by habitat loss (even within nature reserves), hunting for food and predation by introduced species; it is therefore evaluated as vulnerable on the IUCN Red List.

== Taxonomy ==
The rails are a large and very widespread family, with nearly 150 species. They are small to medium-sized, terrestrial or wetland birds, and their short bodies are often flattened laterally to help them move through dense vegetation. Island species readily become flightless; of 53 extant or recently extinct taxa restricted to islands, 32 have lost the ability to fly.

The snoring rail was first classified as Rallus plateni by German ornithologist August Wilhelm Heinrich Blasius in 1886, but was moved to its current monotypic genus Aramidopsis by English zoologist Richard Bowdler Sharpe in 1893. Following Taylor (1998), it was considered to be more similar to the Inaccessible Island and white-throated rails than to members of the genus Rallus, but a 2012 mitochondrial gene study suggests that it should actually be placed in Gallirallus, with Lewin's rail and the slaty-breasted rail as its closest relatives.

Aramidopsis derives from the genus name of the limpkin, Aramus and the Greek suffix opsis, "resembling". Although the rail shares the origin of its name with the South American Aramides species, its distinctive bill, thick legs and barred lower belly distinguish it from that group. The species name plateni commemorates Carl Constantin Platen, a German doctor who collected birds and butterflies in the Malay Archipelago and gave Blasius his specimen of the rail. The common name refers to the rail's distinctive call, and was given to the bird as der Vogel Schnarch (the snoring bird) by German entomologist Gerd Heinrich when he rediscovered the species in 1932.

== Description ==
The snoring rail is 30 cm (12 in) long and weighs 143–160 g (5.0–5.6 oz). It is flightless, with short wings, a very short tail and strong legs and feet. The back and the underparts from the forecrown to the breast are grey, apart from a white chin, and the sides and rear of the neck are deep orange-red. Most of the rest of the upperparts are brown, and the belly, flanks, and undertail have white barring. The male has black legs, a yellow iris and a brown and greenish down-curved bill. The female is similar but has a brighter hindneck colour, less white on the chin, a red iris, a cream and reddish bill and blue-grey legs. Immature and juvenile plumages are undescribed. Visual confusion with sympatric rails is unlikely. The blue-faced rail is similar in size, but is chestnut above and black below, and the buff-banded rail has strongly marked upperparts, breast, and head. The slaty-breasted rail is smaller and has barred upperparts.

The call, given frequently, is a short wheez followed by a distinctive snoring ee-orrrr. A deep hmmmm sound has also been recorded.

== Distribution and habitat ==
The species is an uncommon Indonesian endemic of lowland and hill forests in northern, north central and southeastern Sulawesi. Another population was found on Buton island in 1995.

The typical habitat of this species is dense vegetation in wet areas. This may include impenetrable bamboo and liana in forests, rattan in regrown forests, or elephant grass and bushes on the hillsides of Minahassa Peninsula. Claims of the species occurring in rice fields are believed to be due to confusion with the buff-banded rail. The snoring rail occurs from sea level to 1,300 m (4,300 ft).

== Behaviour ==
Its inaccessible habitat and sparse distribution means that little is known about this species. A few birds were shot by Platen and another expedition led by Paul Sarasin and his second cousin, Fritz, between 1893 and 1898, but the rail was then not seen for more than thirty years until Heinrich found it almost at the end of a two-year survey of Sulawesi, then known as Celebes. He described it as "the most priceless catch that I have ever hunted or will hunt". More than a decade later, Dutch ornithologist Louis Coomans de Ruiter also took a year to find the rail, despite concentrating on known suitable habitat. There were then no documented sightings until birds were observed in 1983 and 1989. Sight records remain infrequent, and only about ten specimen corpses have been studied.

The snoring rail catches crabs in highland streams, and these crustaceans may be a major dietary item. It also forages in muddy areas, and has been recorded as consuming lizards. Nothing is known of its breeding behaviour other than a report of an adult seen feeding with two chicks in August 1983, but the original report gives no details of the claimed sighting.

== Status ==
The snoring rail is restricted to Sulawesi and Buton and has an estimated population of 3,500–15,000 individuals. Its numbers are thought to be decreasing, and its restricted range and small population mean that the species is classified as Vulnerable by the International Union for Conservation of Nature (IUCN).

It may always have been thinly spread, but there has been widespread deforestation within its range resulting in loss and fragmentation of suitable habitat. The rail has been protected under Indonesian law since 1972, and the large Lore Lindu and Bogani Nani Wartabone National Parks are within its range, but logging and rattan cutting occurs even in these protected areas, and human encroachment is also a problem at Lore Lindu. The rail has been trapped for food in the past, and is sometimes killed by dogs, cats and other introduced predators. A 2007 survey of protected areas of Sulawesi failed to find the rail, suggesting that it is genuinely rare even in reserves.

== Cited texts ==
- Heinrich, Bernd (2007). The snoring bird: my family's journey through a century of biology. New York: Ecco (Harper Collins). ISBN 978-0-06-074215-7.
- Jobling, James A (2010). The Helm Dictionary of Scientific Bird Names. London: Christopher Helm. p. 52. ISBN 978-1-4081-2501-4.
- Meyer, Adolf Bernhard; Wiglesworth, Lionel W (1898). The Birds of Celebes and the neighbouring islands. Vol. 1. Berlin: R Friedlander & Sohn.
- Meyer, Adolf Bernhard; Wiglesworth, Lionel W (1898). The Birds of Celebes and the neighbouring islands. Vol. 2. Berlin: R Friedlander & Sohn.
- Roots, Clive (2006). Flightless Birds. Westport, Connecticut: Greenwood Publishing. ISBN 978-0-313-33545-7.
- Taylor, Barry; van Perlo, Ber (1998). Rails. Robertsbridge, East Sussex: Pica / Christopher Helm. ISBN 1-873403-59-3.
