= Cheke's wood rail =

Scientific classification
- Kingdom: Animalia
- Phylum: Chordata
- Class: Aves
- Order: Gruiformes
- Family: Rallidae
- Genus: Dryolimnas
- Species: †D. chekei

Binomial name
- †Dryolimnas chekei Hume, 2019
- Location of Mauritius (in blue)

Extinct species of bird

Cheke's wood rail (Dryolimnas chekei), also known as Sauzier's wood rail, is an extinct species of rail that was endemic to the Mascarene Islands of Mauritius. It was described by British ornithologist Julian P. Hume in 2019, and the name honors British ecologist Anthony S. Cheke.

Previously mentioned as an undescribed extinct taxon and provisionally named Sauzier's wood-rail, or Dryolimnas sp., it was described as a new species in 2019. It is known from Mauritius and was originally thought to be an isolated population of D. cuvieri cuvieri, which is a rare vagrant to Mauritius, until analysis of the fossils found it to be a distinct flightless taxon that is likely descended from D. cuvieri. This species may be the "small rail" referred to in the accounts of Dutch explorers, in contrast to the "large rail", which may be the red rail.
