= Turtle-jawed moa-nalo =

Turtle-jawed moa-nalo Temporal range: Holocene
- Reconstruction of species’ appearance by Julian P. Hume

Scientific classification
- Kingdom: Animalia
- Phylum: Chordata
- Class: Aves
- Order: Anseriformes
- Family: Anatidae
- Genus: †Chelychelynechen; Olson & James, 1991
- Species: †C. quassus

Binomial name
- †Chelychelynechen quassus Olson & James 1991

Extinct species of bird

The turtle-jawed moa-nalo (Chelychelynechen quassus), also formerly referred to as the large Kauai goose, is a species of moa-nalo (a group of extinct, flightless, large goose-like ducks), which evolved in the Hawaiian Islands of the North Pacific Ocean. It was described in 1991 from subfossil material collected in 1976 by Storrs Olson from the calcareous Makawehi dunes on the south-eastern coast of the island of Kauai. Its remains have also been found at the nearby Makauwahi Cave site.

== Taxonomy ==
The generic name Chelychelynechen comes from the Greek chelys ("turtle"), chelyne ("lip" or "jaw"), with chen ("goose"), referring to the distinctly turtle-like appearance and structure of the beak. The specific epithet is from the Latin quassus ("broken" or "shattered"), alluding to the fragmentary condition of the type material. It is monotypic in the genus Chelychelynechen.

== Description ==
Apart from the head, the bird was similar to other moa-nalo species, with robust legs and reduced, non-functional wings. The main distinguishing feature was the remarkable beak which had a rostrum almost as high as it was long, with a broad palatal surface, and with nostrils oriented almost vertically rather than horizontally. The structure of this feeding apparatus appears convergent on that of tortoises and indicates adaptation to a diet of plants.
