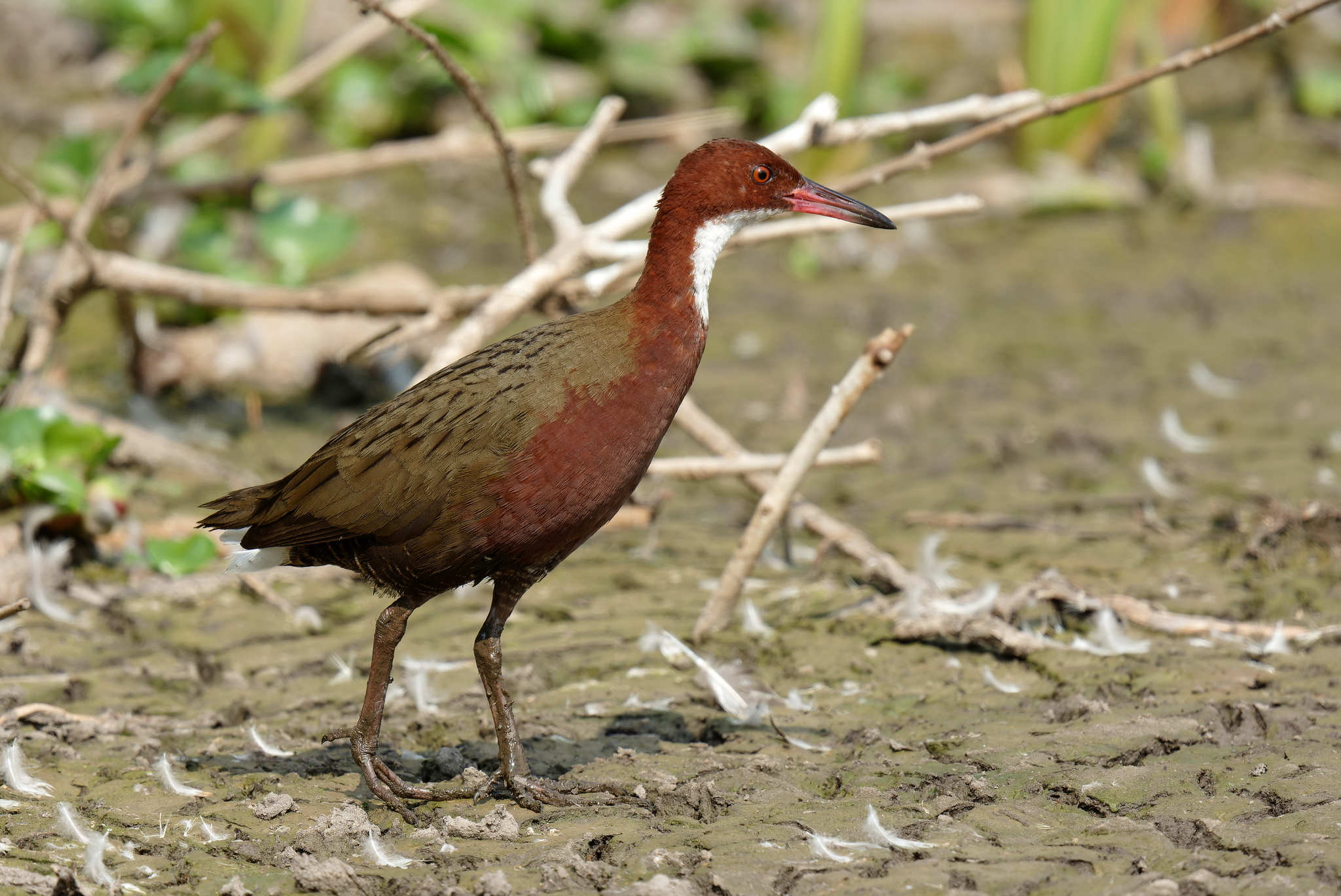
- Dryolimnas cuvieri in Tsarasaotra Park, Madagascar

Conservation status
- Least Concern (IUCN 3.1)

Scientific classification
- Kingdom: Animalia
- Phylum: Chordata
- Class: Aves
- Order: Gruiformes
- Family: Rallidae
- Genus: Dryolimnas
- Species: D. cuvieri

Binomial name
- Dryolimnas cuvieri (Pucheran, 1845)

= White-throated rail =

White-throated rail Temporal range: Pleistocene* & Recent

Species of bird

The white-throated rail (Dryolimnas cuvieri) or Cuvier's rail is a species of bird in the family Rallidae. It is a fairly large rail, and has a flightless subspecies.

== Description ==
The white-throated rail measures 30–33 cm (12–13 in) in length. Males are larger than females. In the nominate subspecies, D. c. cuvieri, males weigh 276 g (9.7 oz) while the female weighs 258 g (9.1 oz). Another subspecies, D. c. aldabranus, is smaller and paler in coloration, weighing 176 g (6.2 oz) in females and 189 g (6.7 oz) in males. This subspecies is flightless. Generally, the white-throated rail is a fairly large rail with a dusky abdomen and thighs with white on its throat and undertail-coverts.

== Distribution ==
It is resident in Madagascar and breeds in the Seychelles, particularly on Aldabra Island.

== Taxonomy ==
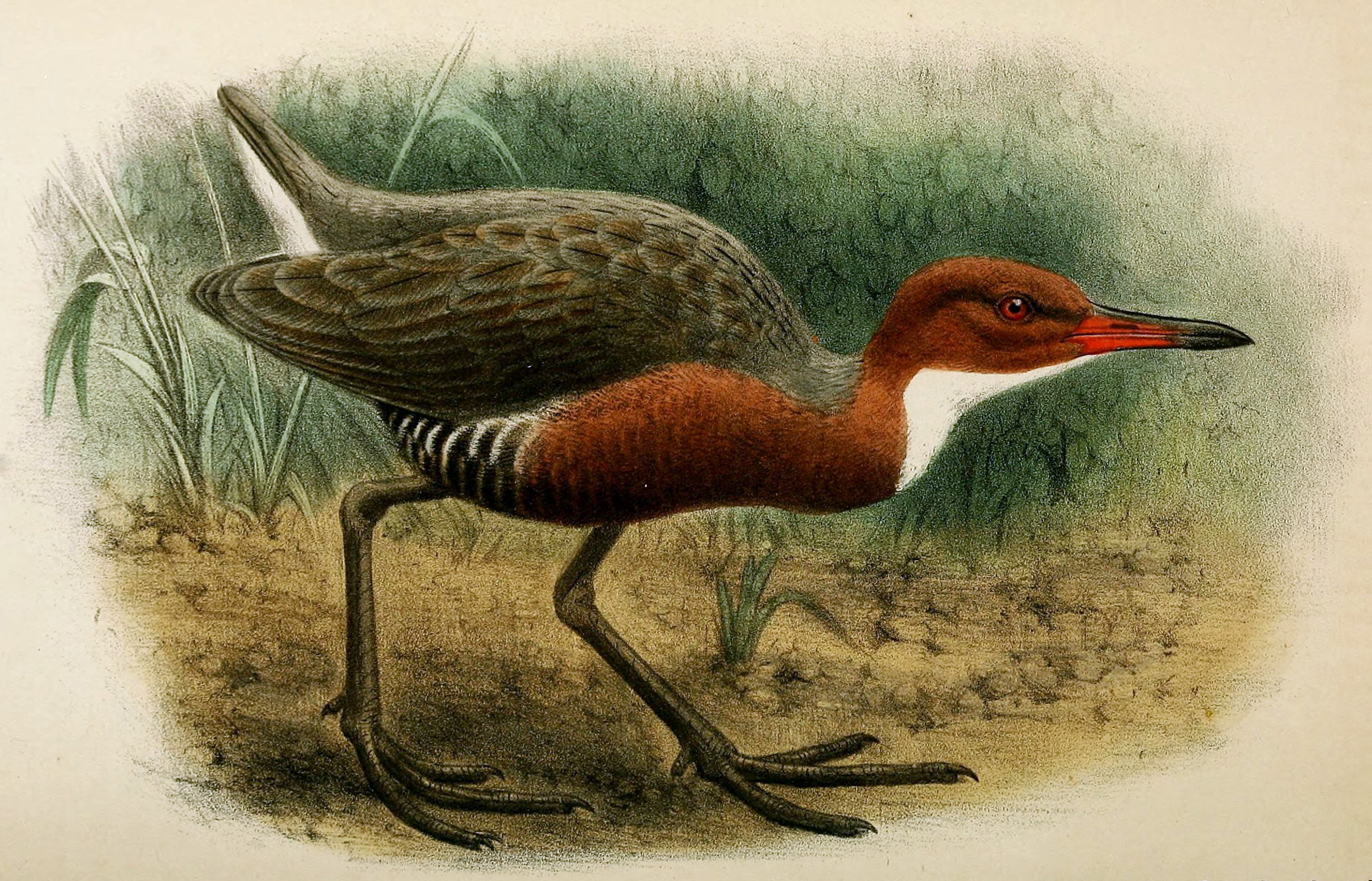
Illustration of the extinct Assumption Island subspecies, 1908

The nominate subspecies is found in Madagascar. A flightless subspecies (sometimes considered a distinct species), Dryolimnas (cuvieri) aldabranus (Aldabra rail), inhabits Aldabra, while the semi-flightless subspecies D. c. abbotti (Assumption Island rail) from Assumption Island went extinct in the early 20th century due to introduced predators. A fourth extinct flightless subspecies or descendant species is known from fossil remains on Aldabra, and anatomically was almost identical to the Aldabra rail. This subspecies was wiped out by rising sea levels during the Pleistocene, but the atoll was recolonized by the white-throated rail after it resurfaced; this population evolved in a very similar way to the extinct subspecies, eventually evolving into the modern Aldabra rail. This is one of the very few observed instances of iterative evolution, in which a distinct population is wiped out from an area but it is recolonized by members of the source population, who evolve in the same way as the extinct population.

It is now the last living member of the genus Dryolimnas, and the Aldabra subspecies is believed to be the last flightless bird in the Indian Ocean. Its natural habitats are subtropical or tropical moist lowland forest and subtropical or tropical mangrove forest.

== Behavior ==
The white-throated rail feeds primarily on invertebrates, as well as eggs and hatchlings of the green turtle. In coastal areas, it is also known to drink salt water.

In Madagascar, it breeds mostly during times of rain. They are monogamous and territorial, forming strong permanent pair bonds. 3–4 eggs are typically laid. Chicks hatch covered in olive-black down. Both parents care for the young, which becomes independent at 12–15 weeks of age, after which parents become aggressive to them.
