= List of Late Quaternary prehistoric bird species =

Extinct bird species

Late Quaternary prehistoric birds are avian taxa that became extinct during the Late Quaternary – the Late Pleistocene or the Early Holocene – and before recorded history, specifically before they could be studied alive by ornithological science. They had died out before the period of global scientific exploration that started in the late 15th century. In other words, this list deals with bird extinctions between 40,000 BC and AD 1500. For the purposes of this article, a "bird" is any member of the clade Neornithes; that is, any descendant of the most recent common ancestor of all currently living birds.

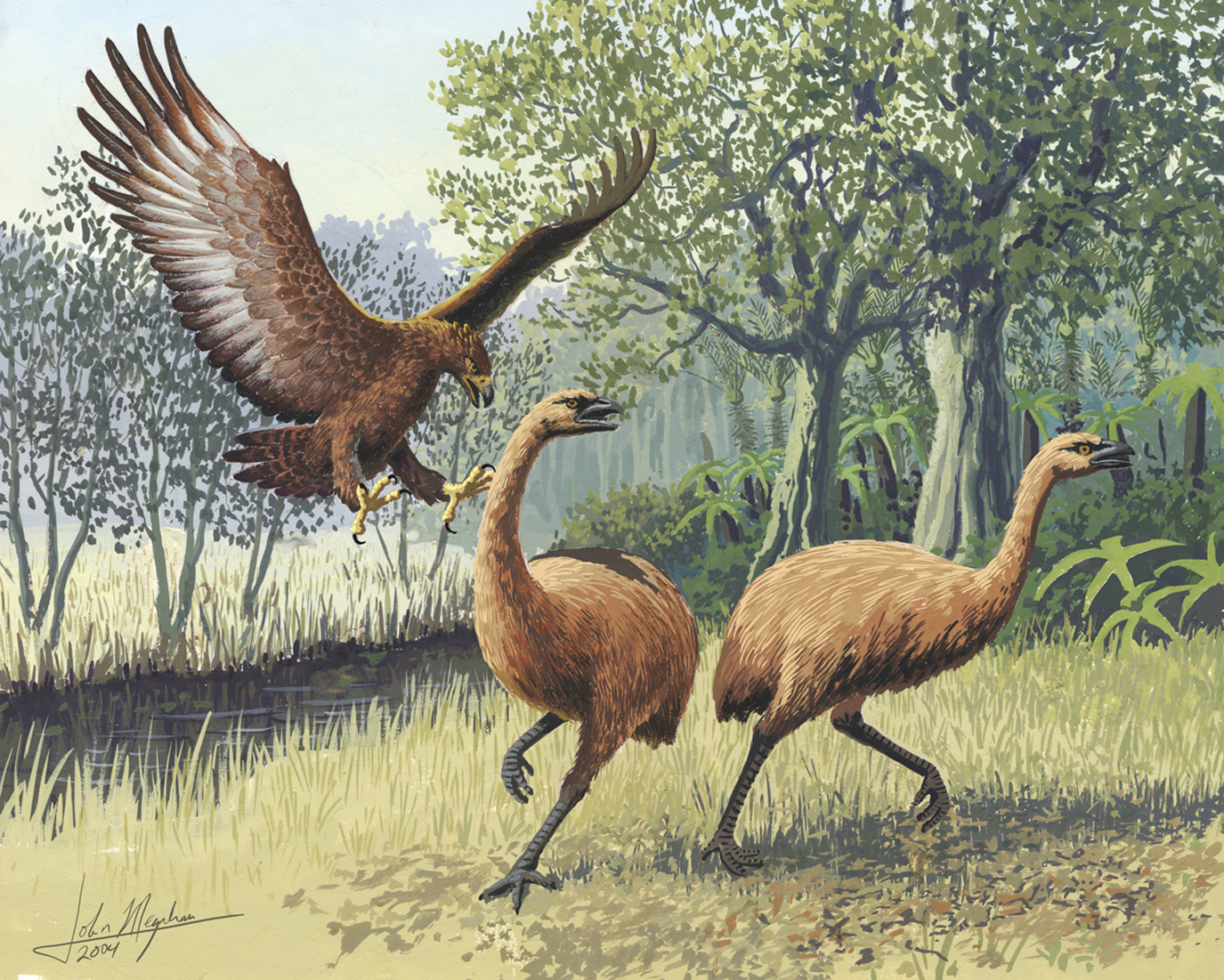
An artist's rendition of a Haast's eagle attacking two South Island giant moa

These birds are known from their remains, which are subfossil bones; as the remains are not completely fossilized, they may yield organic material for molecular analyses to provide additional clues for resolving their taxonomic affiliations. Some birds are also known from folk memory, as in the case of Haast's eagle in New Zealand.

The extinction of the taxa in this list was coincident with the expansion of Homo sapiens beyond Africa and Eurasia, and in most cases, anthropogenic factors played a crucial part in their extinction, be it through hunting, introduced predators or habitat alteration. It is notable that a large proportion of the species are from oceanic islands, especially in Polynesia. Bird taxa that evolved on oceanic islands are usually very vulnerable to hunting or predation by dogs, cats, pigs, goats or rats (animals commonly introduced by humans) as they evolved in the absence of mammalian predators, and therefore have only rudimentary predator avoidance behavior. Many, especially rails, have additionally become flightless for the same reason and thus present even easier prey.

Taxon extinctions taking place before the Late Quaternary happened in the absence of significant human interference. Rather, reasons for extinction are random abiotic events such as bolide impacts, climate changes, mass volcanic eruptions, etc. Alternatively, species may have become extinct due to evolutionary displacement by successor or competitor taxa – it is notable for example that in the early Neogene, seabird biodiversity was much higher than today; this is probably due to competition by the radiation of marine mammals after that time. The relationships of these ancient birds are often hard to determine, as many are known only from very fragmentary remains and complete fossilization precludes analysis of information from DNA, RNA or protein sequencing.

Extinct birds differed from still-existing birds by being larger, mostly restricted to islands, and often flightless. These factors made them especially vulnerable to human prosecution and to other anthropogenically related declines.

== Taxonomic list of Late Quaternary prehistoric birds ==
All of these birds are in Neornithes.

== Palaeognathae ==
=== Struthioniformes ===
The ostriches

- Struthionidae – ostriches
  - Extinct species of extant genera
    - East Asian ostrich, Struthio anderssoni (China and Mongolia, East Asia)
    - Asian ostrich, Struthio asiaticus (India)

=== †Aepyornithiformes ===
The elephant birds of Madagascar

- †Aepyornithidae – greater elephant birds
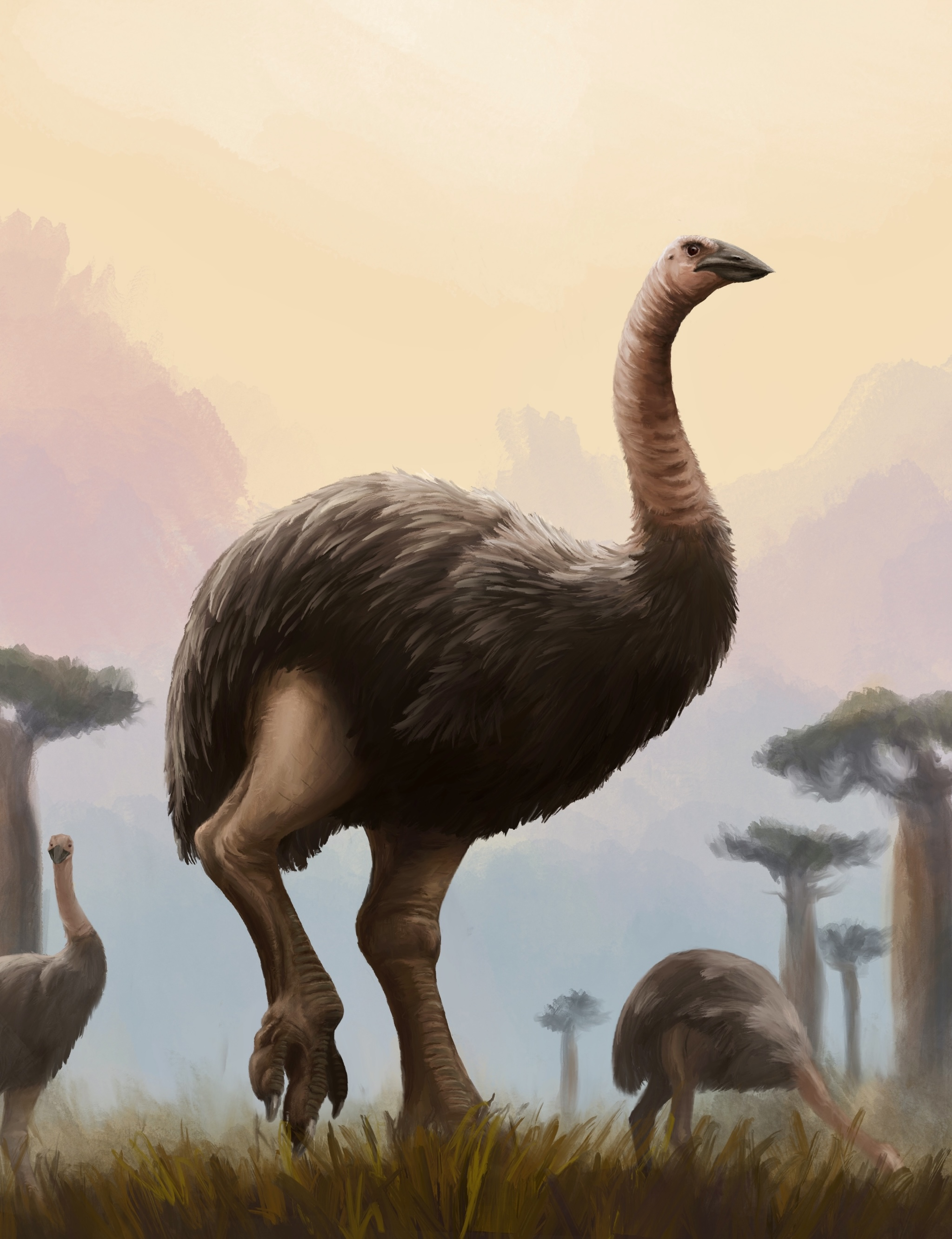
  Giant elephant bird (Aepyornis maximus)
  - †Aepyornis
    - Giant elephant bird, Aepyornis maximus – a 2018 study moved the largest elephant bird specimens to the genus Vorombe, but a 2023 genetic study regarded Vorombe as synonymous with Aepyornis maximus
    - Hildebrandt's elephant bird, Aepyornis hildebrandti
- †Mullerornithidae – lesser elephant birds
  - †Mullerornis
    - Lesser elephant bird, Mullerornis modestus

=== †Dinornithiformes ===
The moa of New Zealand

- †Emeidae – lesser moa
  - †Anomalopteryx
    - Bush moa, Anomalopteryx didiformis (North and South Islands, New Zealand, Southwest Pacific)
  - †Euryapteryx
    - Broad-billed moa, Euryapteryx curtus (North Island, New Zealand, Southwest Pacific)
  - †Pachyornis
    - Crested moa, Pachyornis australis (western South Island, New Zealand, Southwest Pacific)
    - Heavy-footed moa, Pachyornis elephantopus (eastern South Island, New Zealand, Southwest Pacific)
    - Mantell's moa, Pachyornis geranoides (North Island, New Zealand, Southwest Pacific)
  - †Emeus
    - Eastern moa, Emeus crassus (South Island, New Zealand, Southwest Pacific)
- †Dinornithidae – giant moa
  - †Dinornis
    - North Island giant moa, Dinornis novaezealandiae (North Island, New Zealand, Southwest Pacific)
    - South Island giant moa, Dinornis robustus (South Island, New Zealand, Southwest Pacific)
- †Megalapterygidae – upland moa
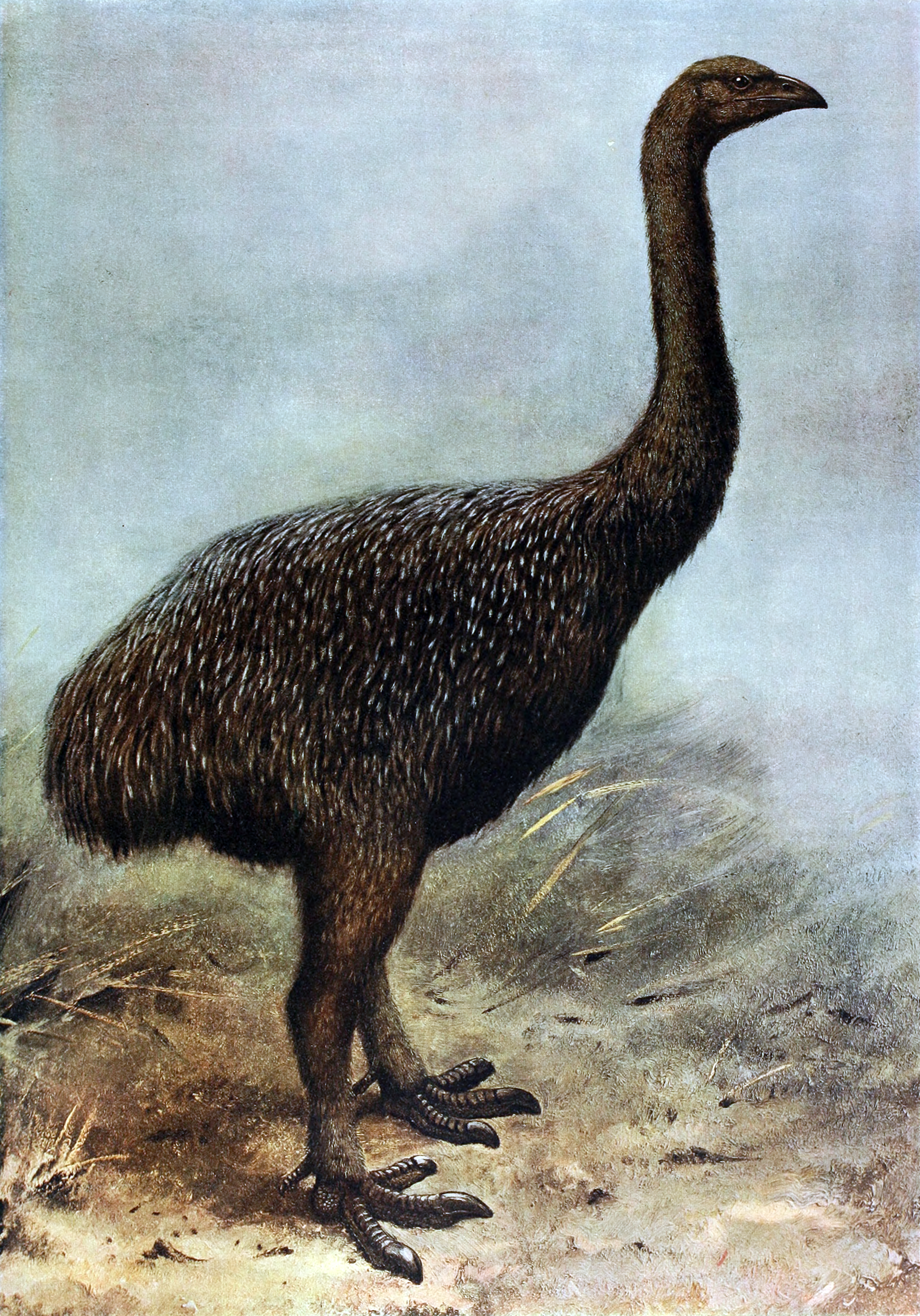
  Upland moa (Megalapteryx didinus)
  - †Megalapteryx
    - Upland moa, Megalapteryx didinus (South Island, New Zealand, Southwest Pacific) – may have survived into historic times (syn. Megalapteryx benhami)

== †Gastornithiformes ==
An extinct order of giant flightless fowl.

- †Dromornithidae – Australian mihirungs or "demon ducks of doom"
  - †Genyornis
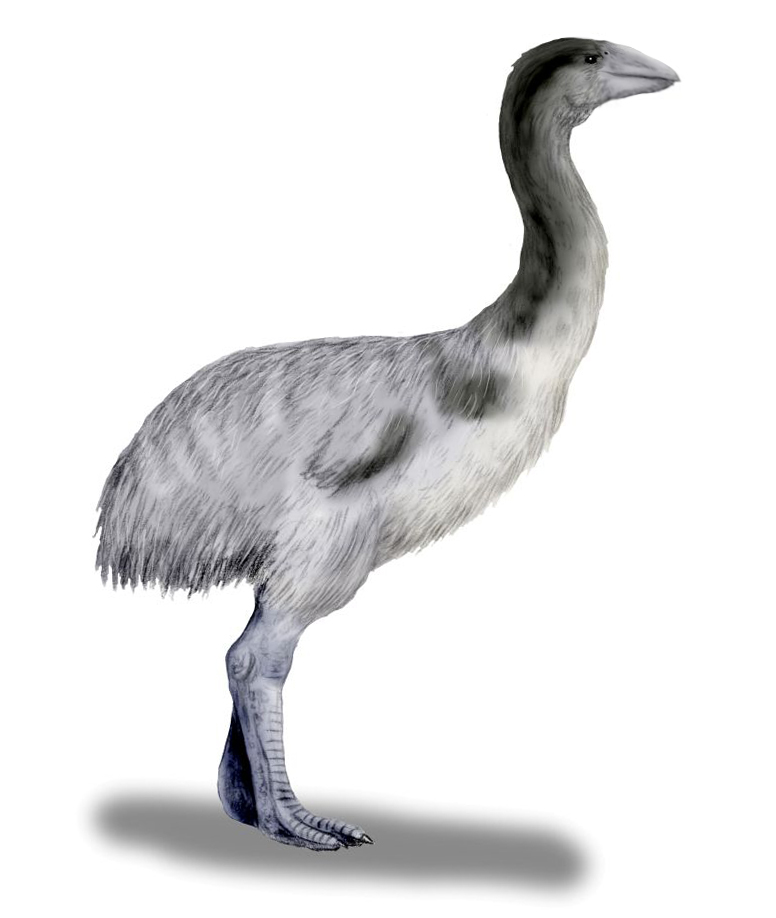
    Genyornis newtoni
    - Genyornis newtoni (Australia)

== Anseriformes ==
The group that includes modern ducks, geese, swans, and screamers.

- Anatidae – ducks, geese and swans
  - †Cnemiornis – New Zealand geese
    - South Island goose, Cnemiornis calcitrans (South Island, New Zealand, Southwest Pacific)
    - North Island goose, Cnemiornis gracilis (North Island, New Zealand, Southwest Pacific)
  - †Centrornis
    - Malagasy sheldgoose, Centrornis majori (Madagascar)
  - †Chelychelynechen
    - Turtle-jawed moa-nalo, Chelychelynechen quassus (Kauaʻi, Hawaiian Islands)
  - †Thambetochen
    - Maui Nui large-billed moa-nalo, Thambetochen chauliodous (Maui and Molokaʻi, Hawaiian Islands)
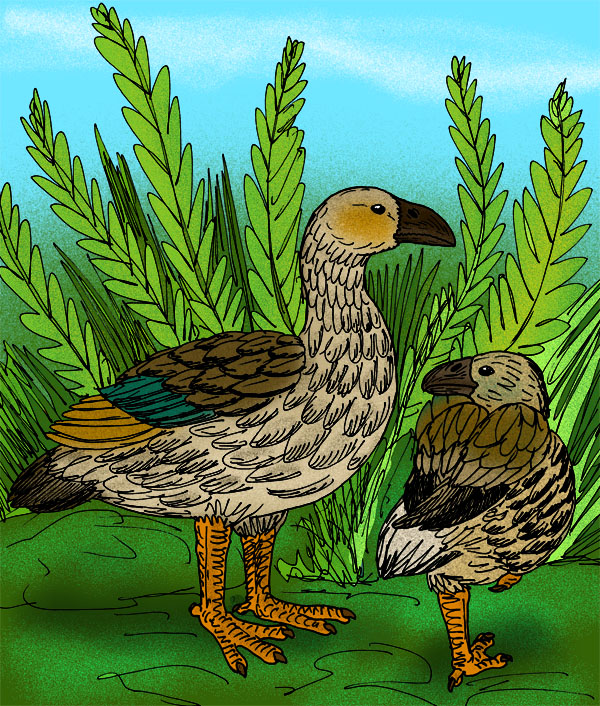
      Maui Nui large-billed moa-nalo (Thambetochen chauliodous) and small-billed moa-nalo (Ptaiochen pau)
    - Oʻahu moa-nalo, Thambetochen xanion (Oʻahu, Hawaiian Islands)
  - †Ptaiochen
    - Small-billed moa-nalo or stumbling moa-nalo, Ptaiochen pau (Maui, Hawaiian Islands)
  - †Chendytes
    - California flightless sea duck, Chendytes lawi (California and southern Oregon coasts and the Channel Islands, East Pacific)
  - †Talpanas
    - Kauaʻi mole duck, Talpanas lippa (Kauaʻi, Hawaiian Islands)
  - Extinct species of extant genera
    - Dendrocygninae – whistling ducks
      - Dendrocygna
        - Aitutaki whistling duck, Dendrocygna sp. (Aitutaki, Cook Islands, South Pacific)
    - Anserinae
    - Biziurini – musk ducks
      - Biziura
        - New Zealand musk duck or De Lautour's duck, Biziura delautouri (North Island and South Island, New Zealand, Southwest Pacific)
    - Oxyurini
      - Oxyura - stiff-tailed ducks
        - New Zealand stiff-tailed duck, Oxyura vantetsi (North Island, New Zealand, Southwest Pacific)
    - Anserini – geese and swans
  - Malacorhynchus
    - Scarlett's duck, Malacorhynchus scarletti (New Zealand, Southwest Pacific)
  - Branta – black geese or white-cheeked geese
    - Nēnē-nui or wood-walking goose, Branta hylobadistes (Maui, possibly Kauaʻi and Oʻahu, Hawaiian Islands)
    - Giant Hawaiʻi goose, Branta rhuax (Big Island, Hawaiian Islands) – formerly in the monotypic genus Geochen
  - Anser – gray geese and white geese
    - Dyuktai goose, Anser djuktaiensis (Yakutia, Russia)
    - Anser aff. erythropus (Ibiza, Mediterranean Sea)
  - Cygnus – swans
    - Giant swan, Cygnus falconeri (Malta and Sicily, Mediterranean Sea)
    - Dwarf swan, Cygnus equitum (Malta and Sicily, Mediterranean Sea) – occasionally placed in the genus Anser
    - New Zealand swan, Cygnus sumnerensis (New Zealand and the Chatham Islands, Southwest Pacific)
      - New Zealand swan, Cygnus sumnerensis sumnerensis (South Island, New Zealand, Southwest Pacific)
      - Chatham Islands swan, Cygnus sumnerensis chathamicus (Chatham Islands, Southwest Pacific)
  - Anatinae – ducks
    - Tadornini – shelducks and sheldgeese
      - Tadorna – shelducks
        - Rēkohu shelduck, Tadorna rekohu (Chatham Islands, Southwest Pacific)
      - Alopochen – sheldgeese
        - Malagasy shelduck or Sirabe shelduck, Alopochen sirabensis (Madagascar) – may be a subspecies of the Mauritius sheldgoose or Mauritius shelduck (Alopochen mauritiana), which survived in Mauritius until the 1690s
      - Neochen
        - Neochen barbadiana (Barbados, West Indies)
        - Neochen debilis (Argentina, South America)
        - Neochen pugil (Brazil, South America)
    - Mergini – sea ducks
      - Mergellus
        - Mergellus mochanovi (Yakutia, Russia)
      - Mergus – typical mergansers
        - Chatham Island merganser, Mergus milleneri (Chatham Island, Chatham Islands, Southwest Pacific)
  - Aythyini – diving ducks
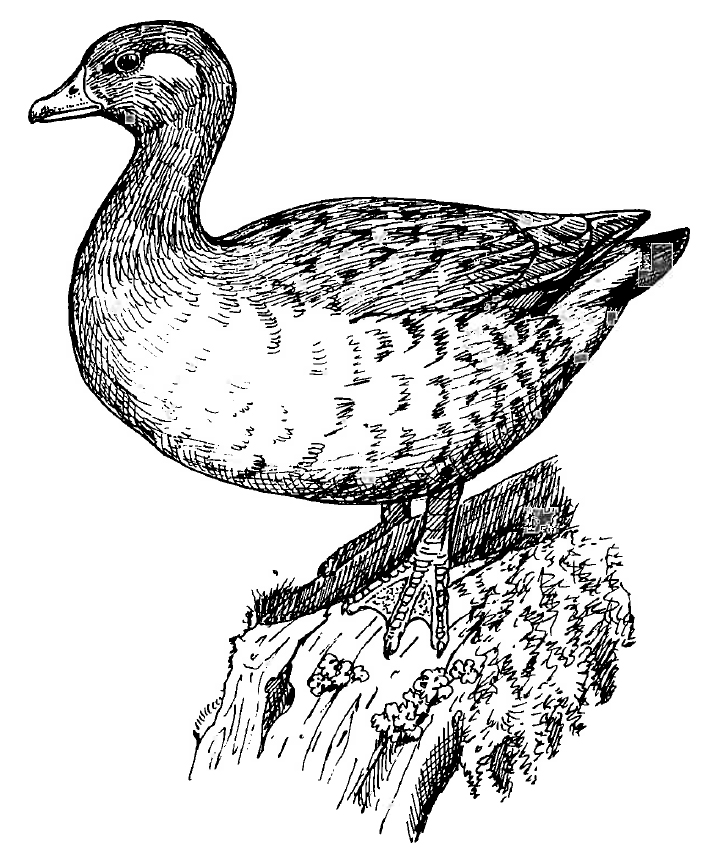
    Finsch's duck (Chenonetta finschi)
    - Chenonetta
      - Finsch's duck, Chenonetta finschi (New Zealand, Southwest Pacific) – possibly survived to 1870
  - Anatini – dabbling ducks
    - Anas
      - Anas amotape (Talara Tar Seeps, Late Pleistocene of Peru, South America)
      - Anas elapsum (Chinchilla Late Pleistocene of the Condamine River, Australia) ("Nettion")
      - Anas gracilipes (Late Pleistocene of Australia) – likely synonymous with the still-existing chestnut teal (Anas castanea)
      - Anas schneideri (Late Pleistocene of Little Box Elder Cave, U.S.)
      - Anas strennum (Late Pleistocene of Patteramordu, Australia) ("Nettion")
      - Mascarene teal, Mauritius duck or Sauzier's teal, Anas theodori (Mauritius and Réunion, Mascarenes) – became extinct on Mauritius c. 1700 and on Réunion in 1710, 10 years later
      - Bermuda flightless duck, Anas pachyscelus (Bermuda, West Atlantic)
      - Macquarie Islands teal, Anas cf. chlorotis (Macquarie Islands, Southwest Pacific)
      - Chatham duck, Anas chathamica (Chatham Islands, Southwest Pacific)
  - Placement unresolved
    - Giant Oʻahu goose, Anatidae sp. et gen. indet. (Oʻahu, Hawaiian Islands)
    - Long-legged shelduck, Anatidae sp. et gen. indet. (Kauaʻi, Hawaiian Islands)
    - Rota flightless duck, Anatidae sp. et gen. indet. (Rota, Marianas, West Pacific)

== Pangalliformes ==
The group that includes landfowl or gamefowl.

- †Sylviornithidae – sylviornises or New Caledonian giant megapodes
  - †Megavitiornis
    - Noble megapode or deep-billed megapode, Megavitiornis altirostris (Viti Levu, Fiji)
  - †Sylviornis
    - Sylviornis neocaledoniae (New Caledonia, Melanesia)

Galliformes

- Megapodidae – megapodes
  - †Mwalau
    - Mwalau walterlinii (Efate, Vanuatu)
- Giant malleefowl
  - †Progura
    - Progura gallinacea (Australia)
    - Progura campestris (Australia)
  - †Latagallina
    - Latagallina naracoortensis (Australia)
    - Latagallina olsoni (Australia)
  - †Garrdimalga
    - Garrdimalga mcnamarai (Australia)
  - Extinct species of extant genera
    - Megapodius – megapodes
      - Consumed scrubfowl, Megapodius alimentum (Tonga and Fiji)
      - Viti Levu scrubfowl, Megapodius amissus (Viti Levu and possibly Kadavu Island and Aiwa, Fiji) – may have survived up to either the early 19th century or the 20th century
      - Pile-builder megapode, Megapodius molistructor (New Caledonia, Melanesia, Tonga and possibly Aiwa, Fiji)
      - ʻEua scrubfowl or small-footed megapode, Megapodius sp. (ʻEua, Tonga)
      - Lifuka scrubfowl, Megapodius sp. (Lifuka, Tonga)
      - Stout Tongan megapode Megapodius sp. (Tongatapu, Tonga)
      - Megapodius sp. (Ofu-Olosega, Samoa)
      - Large Solomon Islands megapode Megapodius sp. (Buka Island, Solomon Islands, Melanesia)
      - New Caledonian megapode Megapodius sp. (Grande Tierre, New Caledonia, Melanesia)
      - Loyalty megapode Megapodius sp. (Lifou and Maré, Loyalty Islands, South Pacific)
      - New Ireland scrubfowl or large Bismarck's megapode, Megapodius sp. (New Ireland, Melanesia)
- Phasianidae – pheasants and allies
  - Extinct species of extant genera
  - Gallini – francolins and junglefowl
    - Gallus – junglefowl
      - Gallus sp. (Middle/Late Pleistocene of Kudaro, South Ossetia)
      - Gallus imereticus (Late Pleistocene of Gvardjilas-Klde, Imeretia)
      - Gallus meschtscheriensis (Late Pleistocene of Soungir, Russia)
      - Gallus georgicus (Late Pleistocene - Early Holocene of Georgia, Russia)
      - Gallus sp. (Late Pleistocene of Krivtcha Cave, Ukraine)
      - Gallus sp. (Early Holocene of the Dnieper region)
  - Coturnicini
    - Coturnix – Old World quail
      - Canary Islands quail, Coturnix gomerae (Canary Islands, East Atlantic)
      - Porto Santo quail, Coturnix alabrevis (Madeira, East Atlantic)
      - Cape Verde quail, Coturnix centensis (Cape Verde, East Atlantic)
      - Madeiran quail, Coturnix lignorum (Madeira, East Atlantic)
  - Phasianinae
    - Tetraonini
      - Meleagris – turkeys
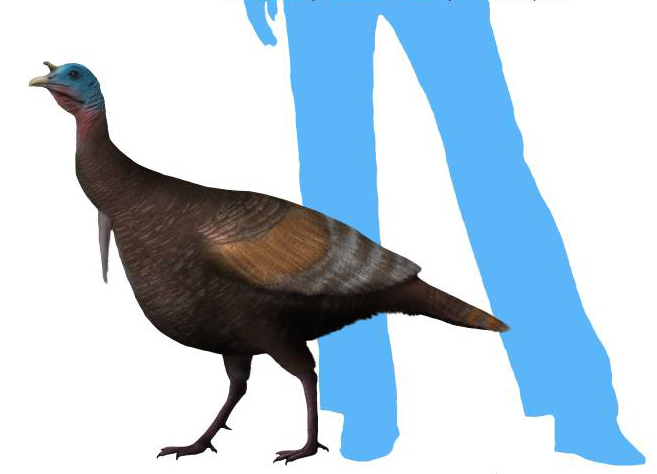
        Californian turkey (Meleagris californica)
        - Californian turkey, Meleagris californica (California, North America)
        - Southwestern turkey, Meleagris crassipes (New Mexico, North America)
    - Phasianini
      - Perdix – true partridges
        - Perdix palaeoperdix (Southern Europe)

== Charadriiformes ==
The group that includes waders, gulls and auks.

=== Charadrii ===
- Charadriidae – plovers and lapwings
  - Vanellinae – lapwings
    - Extinct species of extant genera
      - Vanellus
        - Malagasy lapwing, Vanellus madagascariensis (Madagascar)

=== Scolopaci ===
- Scolopacidae – sandpipers and allies
  - Scolopacinae – dowitchers, snipes and woodcocks
    - Extinct species of extant genera
      - Scolopax – woodcocks
        - Puerto Rican woodcock, Scolopax anthonyi (Puerto Rico, West Indies)
        - Hispaniolan woodcock, Scolopax brachycarpa (Hispaniola, West Indies) – may have survived into historic times
      - Coenocorypha – austral snipes
        - Forbes's snipe, Coenocorypha chathamensis (Chatham Islands, Southwest Pacific)
        - Viti Levu snipe, Coenocorypha miratropica (Viti Levu, Fiji)
        - New Caledonian snipe, Coenocorypha neocaledonica (New Caledonia, Melanesia)
        - Norfolk Island snipe, Coenocorypha sp. (Norfolk Island, Southwest Pacific)
      - Gallinago
        - Gallinago kakuki (Cuba, Bahamas, Cayman Brac, Cayman Islands, West Indies)
  - Arenariinae – turnstones and stints
    - Extinct species of extant genera
      - Prosobonia – Polynesian sandpipers
        - Henderson sandpiper, Prosobonia sauli (Henderson Island, South Pacific)
        - Mangaian sandpiper, Prosobonia sp. (Mangaia, Cook Islands, South Pacific)
        - Ua Huka sandpiper, Prosobonia sp. (Ua Huka, Marquesas Islands, South Pacific)

=== Lari ===
- Alcidae – auks
  - Extinct species of extant genera
    - Fratercula – puffins
      - Dow's puffin, Fratercula dowi (Channel Islands, East Pacific)
- Laridae – gulls
  - Extinct species of extant genera
    - Chroicocephalus
      - Huahine gull or Society Islands gull, Chroicocephalus utunui (Huahine, Society Islands, South Pacific)
    - Larus
      - Kauaʻi gull, Larus sp. (Kauaʻi, Hawaiian Islands)
      - Larus sp. (Saint Helena, South Atlantic) – may be a still-existing form

== Gruiformes ==
The group that includes rails and cranes, probably paraphyletic.

- Nesotrochidae – cave rails
  - †Nesotrochis
    - Antillean cave rail or De Booy's rail, Nesotrochis debooyi (Puerto Rico and United States Virgin Islands, West Indies) – may have survived into historic times
    - Cuban cave rail, Nesotrochis picapicensis (Cuba, West Indies)
    - Haitian cave rail, Nesotrochis steganinos (Haiti, West Indies)
- Rallidae – true rails
  - †Capellirallus
    - Snipe-rail, Capellirallus karamu (North Island, New Zealand, Southwest Pacific)
  - †Vitirallus
    - Fiji rail or Viti Levu rail, Vitirallus watlingi (Viti Levu, Fiji)
  - †Hovacrex
    - Hova gallinule, Hovacrex roberti (Madagascar)
  - Extinct species of extant genera
  - Rallus
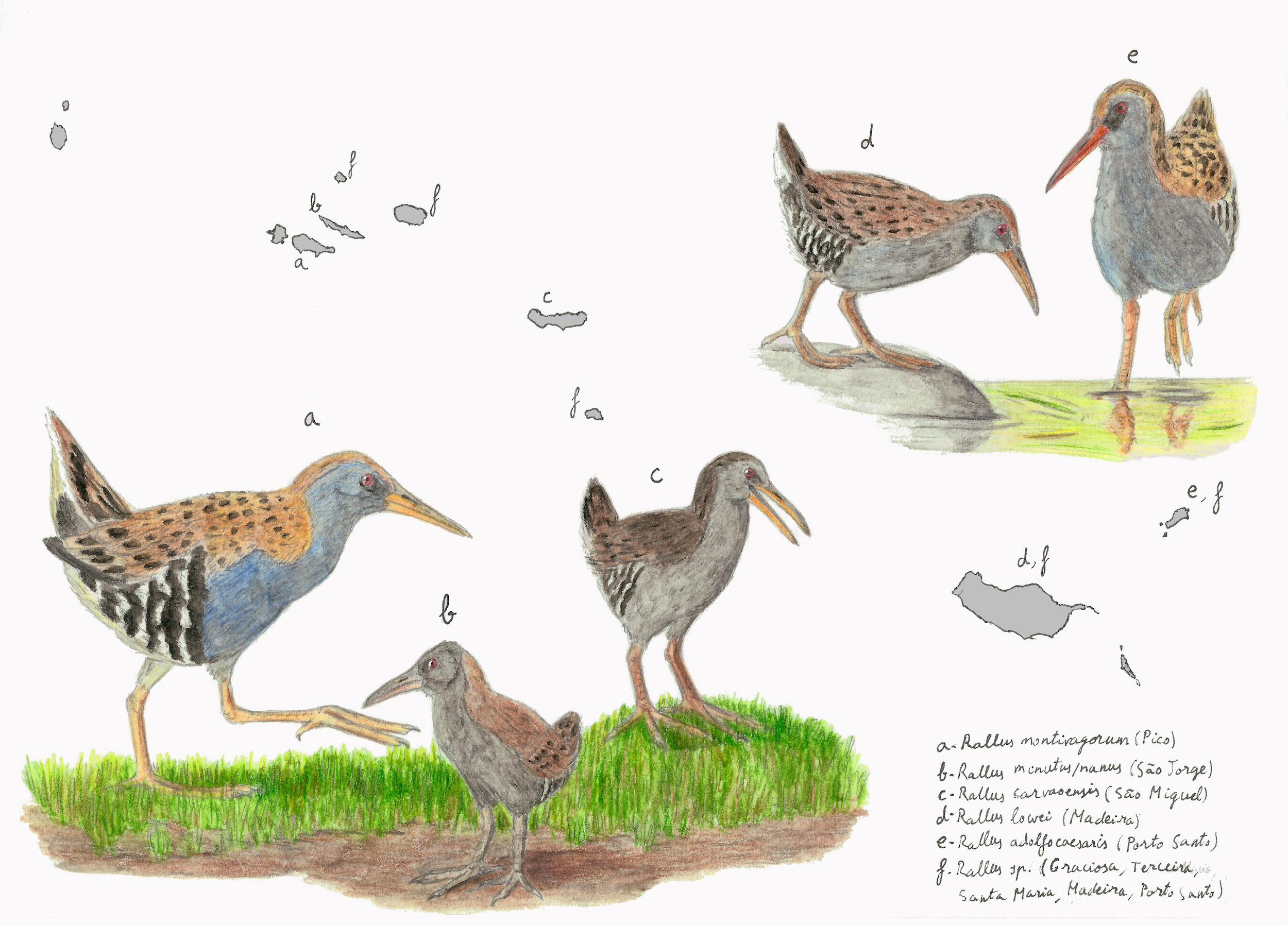
    the 5 extinct Macaronesian rails, from left to right: Pico rail (Rallus montivagorum), São Jorge rail (Rallus nanus), Madeira rail (Rallus lowei), Porto Santo rail (Rallus adolfocaesaris), and the Graciosa rail (Rallus sp.)
    - Ibiza rail, Rallus eivissensis (Ibiza, Mediterranean Sea)
    - Madeira rail, Rallus lowei (Madeira, Macaronesia)
    - Porto Santo rail, Rallus adolfocaesaris (Porto Santo Island, Macaronesia)
    - Rallus sp. (Madeira and Porto Santo Island, Macaronesia) – known from subfossil bones
    - São Miguel rail, Rallus carvaoensis (São Miguel Island, Azores)
    - Pico rail, Rallus montivagorum (Pico Island, Azores)
    - São Jorge rail, Rallus nanus (São Jorge Island, Azores) – erroneously previously described as Rallus minutus, which is a junior homonym
    - Greater Bermuda rail, Rallus recessus (Bermuda, West Atlantic)
    - Lesser Bermuda rail, Rallus ibycus (Bermuda, West Atlantic)
    - Graciosa rail, Rallus sp. (Graciosa, Azores)
    - Terceira rail, Rallus sp. (Terceira, Azores)
    - Santa Maria rail, Rallus sp. (Santa Maria Island, Azores)
    - Rallus cyanocavi (Bahamas, West Indies)
    - Rallus gracilipes (Bahamas, West Indies)
    - Rallus natator (Mexico, North America)
  - Gallirallus
    - Lifuka rail, Gallirallus sp. (Lifuka, Tonga)
    - Nuku Hiva rail, Gallirallus epulare (Nuku Hiva, Marquesas Islands, South Pacific)
    - Ua Huka rail, Gallirallus gracilitibia (Ua Huka, Marquesas Islands, South Pacific)
    - Niue rail, Gallirallus huiatua (Niue)
    - Mangaia rail, Gallirallus ripleyi (Mangaia, Cook Islands, South Pacific)
    - Tahuata rail, Gallirallus roletti (Tahuata, Marquesas Islands, South Pacific)
    - Huahine rail, Gallirallus storrsolsoni (Huahine, Society Islands, South Pacific)
    - Hiva Oa rail, Gallirallus sp. (Hiva Oa, Marquesas Islands, South Pacific)
    - Vava'u rail, Gallirallus vavauensis (Vava'u, Tonga)
    - ʻEua rail, Gallirallus vekamatolu (ʻEua, Tonga)
    - Rota rail, Gallirallus temptatus (Rota, Marianas, West Pacific)
    - Aguijan rail, Gallirallus pisonii (Aguijan, Marianas, West Pacific)
    - Tinian rail, Gallirallus pendiculentus (Tinian, Marianas, West Pacific)
    - Saipan rail, Gallirallus sp. (Saipan, Marianas, West Pacific)
    - New Ireland rail, Gallirallus ernstmayri (New Ireland, Melanesia)
    - Norfolk Island rail, Gallirallus sp. (Norfolk Island, Southwest Pacific) – may have survived to the 19th century
  - Porzana – crakes
    - Great Oʻahu crake, Porzana ralphorum (Oʻahu, Hawaiian Islands)
    - Great Maui crake, Porzana severnsi (Maui, Hawaiian Islands)
    - Mangaia crake, Porzana rua (Mangaia, Cook Islands, South Pacific)
    - Liliput crake, Porzana menehune (Molokaʻi, Hawaiian Islands)
    - Small Oʻahu crake, Porzana ziegleri (Oʻahu, Hawaiian Islands)
    - Small Maui crake, Porzana keplerorum (Maui, Hawaiian Islands)
    - Bermuda crake, Porzana piercei (Bermuda, West Indies)
    - Easter Island crake, Porzana sp. (Easter Island, Southeast Pacific)
    - Great Hawaiian crake, Porzana sp. (Big Island, Hawaiian Islands)
    - Great Kauaʻi crake, Porzana sp. (Kauaʻi, Hawaiian Islands)
    - Huahine crake, Porzana sp. (Huahine, Society Islands, South Pacific)
    - Mangaia crake #2, Porzana sp. (Mangaia, Cook Islands, South Pacific)
    - Marquesas crake, Porzana sp. (Ua Huka, Marquesas Islands, South Pacific)
    - Mariana crake, Porzana sp. (Marianas, West Pacific) – possibly four species
    - Medium Kauaʻi crake, Porzana sp. (Kauaʻi, Hawaiian Islands)
    - Medium Maui crake, Porzana sp. (Maui, Hawaiian Islands)
    - Small Hawaiian crake, Porzana sp. (Big Island, Hawaiian Islands)
    - New Zealand giant crake, Porzana hodgenorum (New Zealand, Southwest Pacific)
  - Porphyrio – swamphens
    - New Caledonian gallinule, Porphyrio kukwiedei (New Caledonia, Melanesia) – may have survived into historic times
    - North Island takahē, Porphyrio mantelli (North Island, New Zealand, Southwest Pacific)
    - Huahine swamphen, Porphyrio mcnabi (Huahine, Society Islands, South Pacific)
    - Marquesas swamphen, Porphyrio paepae (Hiva Oa and Tahuata, Marquesas islands, South Pacific) – may have survived to the late 19th century
    - Porphyrio claytongreenei (Zealandia, Oceania, Southwest Pacific) – Calabrian
    - Buka swamphen, Porphyrio sp. (Buka, Solomon Islands, Melanesia)
    - New Ireland swamphen, Porphyrio sp. (New Ireland, Melanesia)
    - Giant swamphen, Porphyrio sp. (New Ireland, Melanesia)
    - Mangaia swamphen, Porphyrio sp. (Mangaia, Cook Islands, South Pacific) – does not belong to Pareudiastes if that genus is considered valid
    - Norfolk swamphen, Porphyrio sp. (Norfolk Island, Southwest Pacific)
    - Rota swamphen, Porphyrio sp. (Rota, Marianas, West Pacific)
  - Gallinula – moorhens
    - Viti Levu gallinule, ?Gallinula sp. (Viti Levu, Fiji) – would be separated into Pareudiastes if that genus is considered valid, or may be a new genus altogether
  - Fulica – coots
    - New Zealand coot, Fulica prisca (New Zealand, Southwest Pacific)
    - Chatham coot, Fulica chathamensis (Chatham Islands, Southwest Pacific)
    - Fulica montanei (Chile, South America)
    - Fulica shufeldti (Florida, North America) – possibly a paleosubspecies of the still-existing American coot (Fulica americana)
  - Placement unresolved
    - Barbados rail, Rallidae gen. et sp. indet. (Barbados, West Indies) – formerly Fulica podagrica (partim)
    - Easter Island rail, Rallidae gen. et sp. indet. (Easter Island, Southeast Pacific)
    - Fernando de Noronha rail, Rallidae gen. et sp. indet. (Fernando de Noronha, West Atlantic) – probably survived into historic times
- Gruidae – cranes
  - Extinct species of extant genera
    - Antigone
      - Cuban flightless crane, Antigone cubensis (Cuba, West Indies)
    - Grus
      - La Brea crane or Page's crane, Grus pagei (Southern California, North America)
      - Bermuda flightless crane, Grus latipes (Bermuda, West Atlantic)
      - Large crane, Grus primigenia (Southwestern Europe)
      - Maltese crane, Grus melitensis (Malta, Mediterranean Sea) – doubtfully distinct from G. primigenia
      - Grus bogatshevi (Azerbaijan, boundary of Eastern Europe and West Asia) – doubtfully distinct from G. primigenia
- †Aptornithidae – adzebills (probably belongs in a separate order)
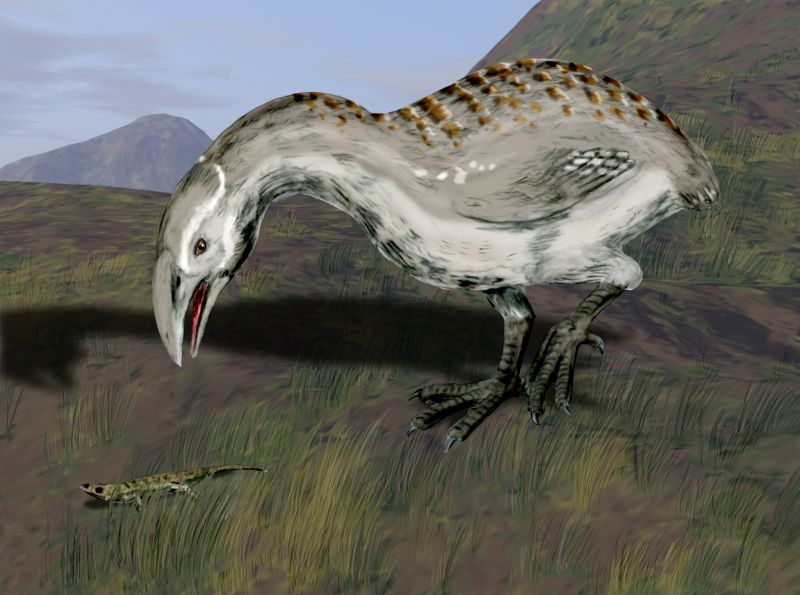
  North Island adzebill (Aptornis otidiformis)
  - †Aptornis
    - North Island adzebill, Aptornis otidiformis (North Island, New Zealand, Southwest Pacific)
    - South Island adzebill, Aptornis defossor (South Island, New Zealand, Southwest Pacific)

== Eurypygiformes ==
- Rhynochetidae – kagus
  - Extinct species of extant genera
    - Rhynochetos
      - Lowland kagu, Rhynochetos orarius (New Caledonia, Melanesia)

== Procellariiformes ==
The group that includes albatrosses, shearwaters, petrels and storm petrels.

- Procellariidae – petrels
  - Extinct species of extant genera
    - Puffinus
      - Dune shearwater or Hole's shearwater, Puffinus holeae (Fuerteventura, Canary Islands, East Atlantic, and the Atlantic coast of the Iberian Peninsula)
      - Lava shearwater or Olson's shearwater, Puffinus olsoni (Canary Islands, East Atlantic)
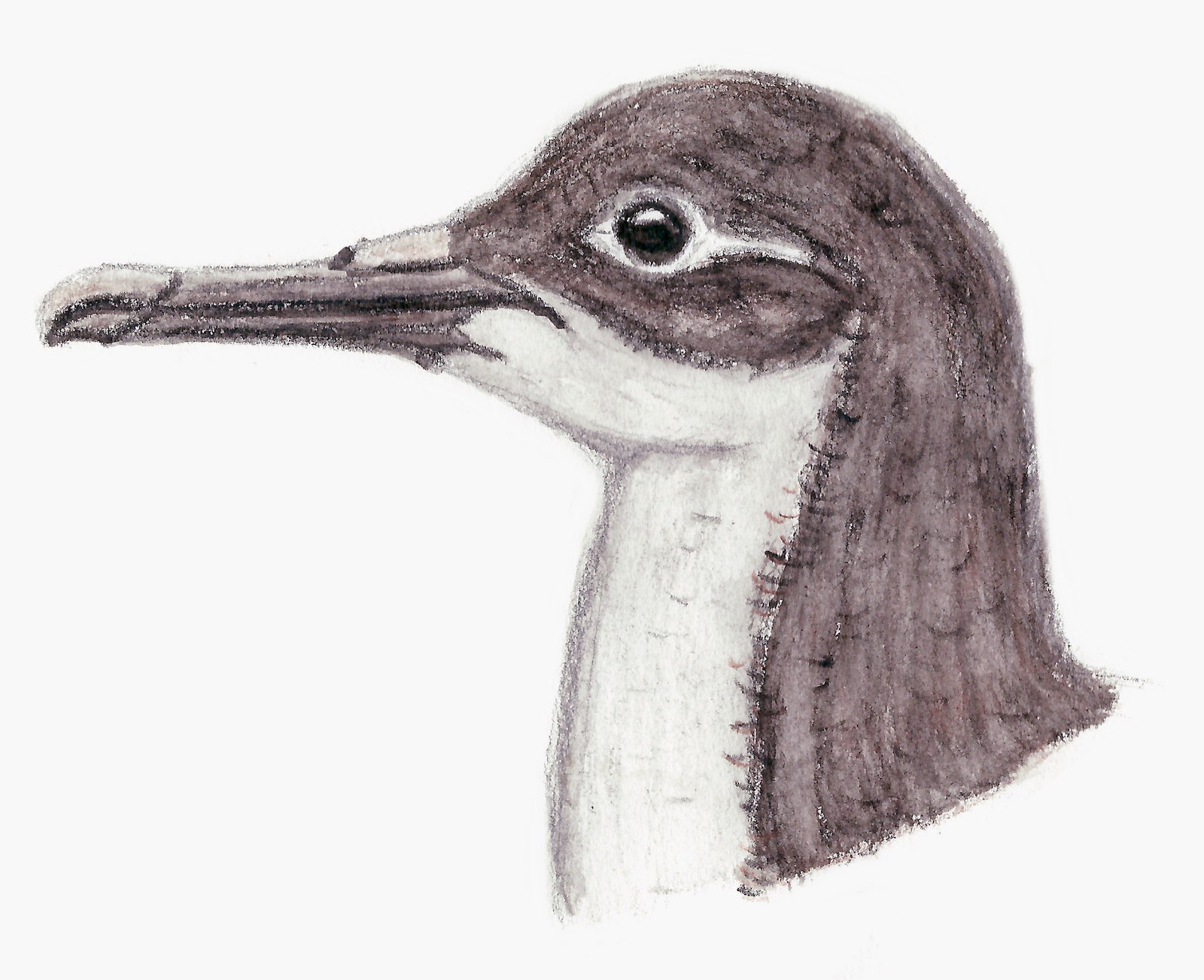
        Lava shearwater (Puffinus olsoni)
      - Scarlett's shearwater, Puffinus spelaeus (South Island, New Zealand, Southwest Pacific)
      - Menorcan shearwater, Puffinus sp. (Menorca, Balearic Islands, Mediterranean Sea) – possibly an extirpated population of a still-existing species
      - ʻEua shearwater, Puffinus sp. (ʻEua, Tonga)
      - ʻEua petrel, Puffinus sp. (ʻEua, Tonga)
    - Ardenna
      - Saint Helena shearwater, Ardenna pacificoides (Saint Helena, South Atlantic)
    - Pterodroma
      - Oʻahu petrel, Pterodroma jugabilis (Oʻahu, Hawaiian Islands)
      - Canary Islands petrel, Pterodroma sp. (El Hierro, Canary Islands, East Atlantic) – possibly an extirpated population of a still-existing species
      - Imber's petrel, Pterodroma imberi (Chatham Islands, Southwest Pacific)
      - Pterodroma sp. (Henderson Island, South Pacific)
      - Pterodroma sp. (Norfolk Island, Southwest Pacific)
    - Pseudobulweria
      - Pseudobulweria sp. (Taravai, Angakauitai, Mangareva, French Polynesia)
    - Placement unresolved
      - Procellariidae sp. (Easter Island, Southeast Pacific) – possibly an extirpated population of a still-existing species

== Sphenisciformes ==
- Spheniscidae – penguins
- Extinct species of extant genera
  - Eudyptes – crested penguins
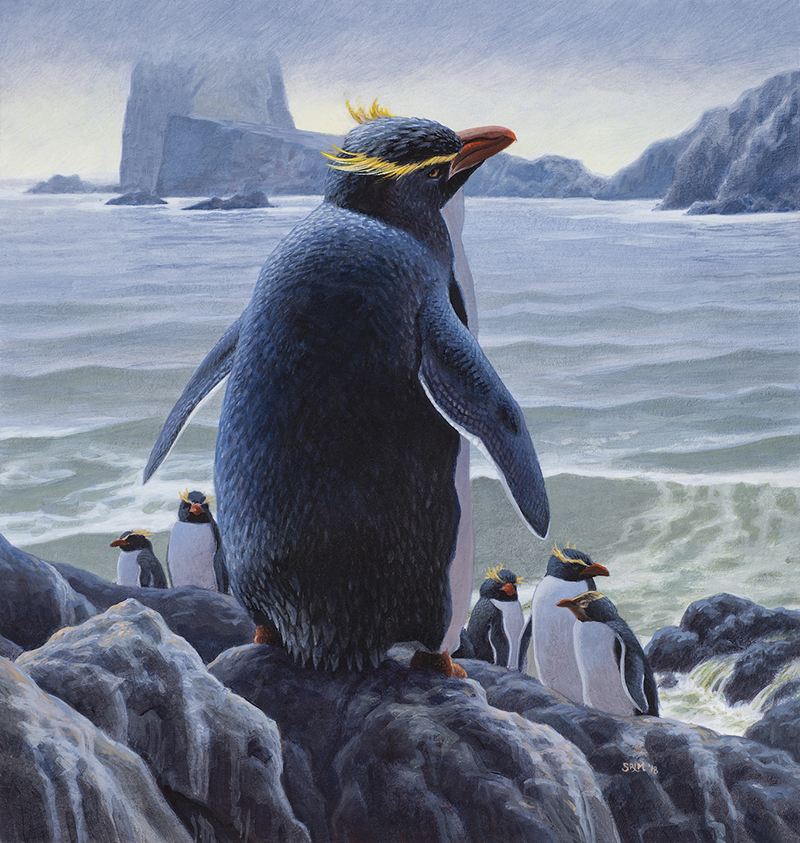
    Chatham penguin (Eudyptes warhami)
    - Chatham penguin, Eudyptes warhami (Chatham Islands, Southwest Pacific) – possibly still existed around 1871 or 1872
  - Extinct subspecies of extant species
    - Waitaha penguin, Megadyptes antipodes waitaha (North Island, South Island, Stewart Island and Codfish Island / Whenua Hou, New Zealand, Southwest Pacific)
    - Richdale's penguin, Megadyptes antipodes richdalei (Chatham Islands, Southwest Pacific)

== Ciconiiformes ==
- Ciconiidae – storks
  - Extinct species of extant genera
    - Leptoptilos
      - Leptoptilos robustus (Flores, Indonesia)
    - Ciconia
      - Asphalt stork or La Brea stork, Ciconia maltha (Western and Southern U.S.)
    - Mycteria
      - Wetmore's stork, Mycteria wetmorei (Cuba, West Indies)

== Suliformes ==
The group that includes frigatebirds, boobies, gannets, cormorants and darters.

- Sulidae – boobies and gannets
  - Extinct subspecies of extant species
    - Hiva Oa booby, Papasula abbotti costelloi (Hiva Oa, Marquesas Islands, South Pacific)
- Phalacrocoracidae – cormorants and shags
  - Extinct species of extant genera
    - Microcarbo
      - Serventy's cormorant, Microcarbo serventyorum (Western Australia)
    - Phalacrocorax
      - Madagascar cormorant, Phalacrocorax sp. (Madagascar)
    - Leucocarbo
      - Kohatu shag, Leucocarbo septentrionalis (North Island, New Zealand, Southwest Pacific)
- Anhingidae – darters
  - Extinct species of extant genera
    - Anhinga
      - Anhinga beckeri (Southeastern U.S.)

== Pelecaniformes ==
- Threskiornithidae – ibises and spoonbills
  - †Apteribis
    - Maui highland ibis, Apteribis brevis (Maui, Hawaiian Islands)
    - Molokaʻi ibis, Apteribis glenos (Molokaʻi, Hawaiian Islands)
    - Maui lowland ibis, Apteribis sp. (Maui, Hawaiian Islands)
    - Lānaʻi ibis, Apteribis sp. (Lānaʻi, Hawaiian Islands)
  - †Xenicibis
    - Jamaican ibis, Xenicibis xympithecus (Jamaica, West Indies)
- Ardeidae – herons, egrets, and bitterns, possibly paraphyletic
  - Extinct species of extant genera
    - Ardea
      - Bennu heron, Ardea bennuides (United Arab Emirates)
    - Nycticorax
      - Niue night heron, Nycticorax kalavikai (Niue)
      - ʻEua night heron, Nycticorax sp. (ʻEua, Tonga)
      - Lifuka night heron, Nycticorax sp. (Lifuka, Tonga) – may be synonymous with the ʻEua night heron
      - Mangaia night heron, Nycticorax sp. (Mangaia, Cook Islands, South Pacific)
  - Placement unresolved
    - Ardeidae gen. et sp. indet. (Easter Island, Southeast Pacific)

== Cathartiformes ==
- †Teratornithidae – teratorns
  - †Teratornis
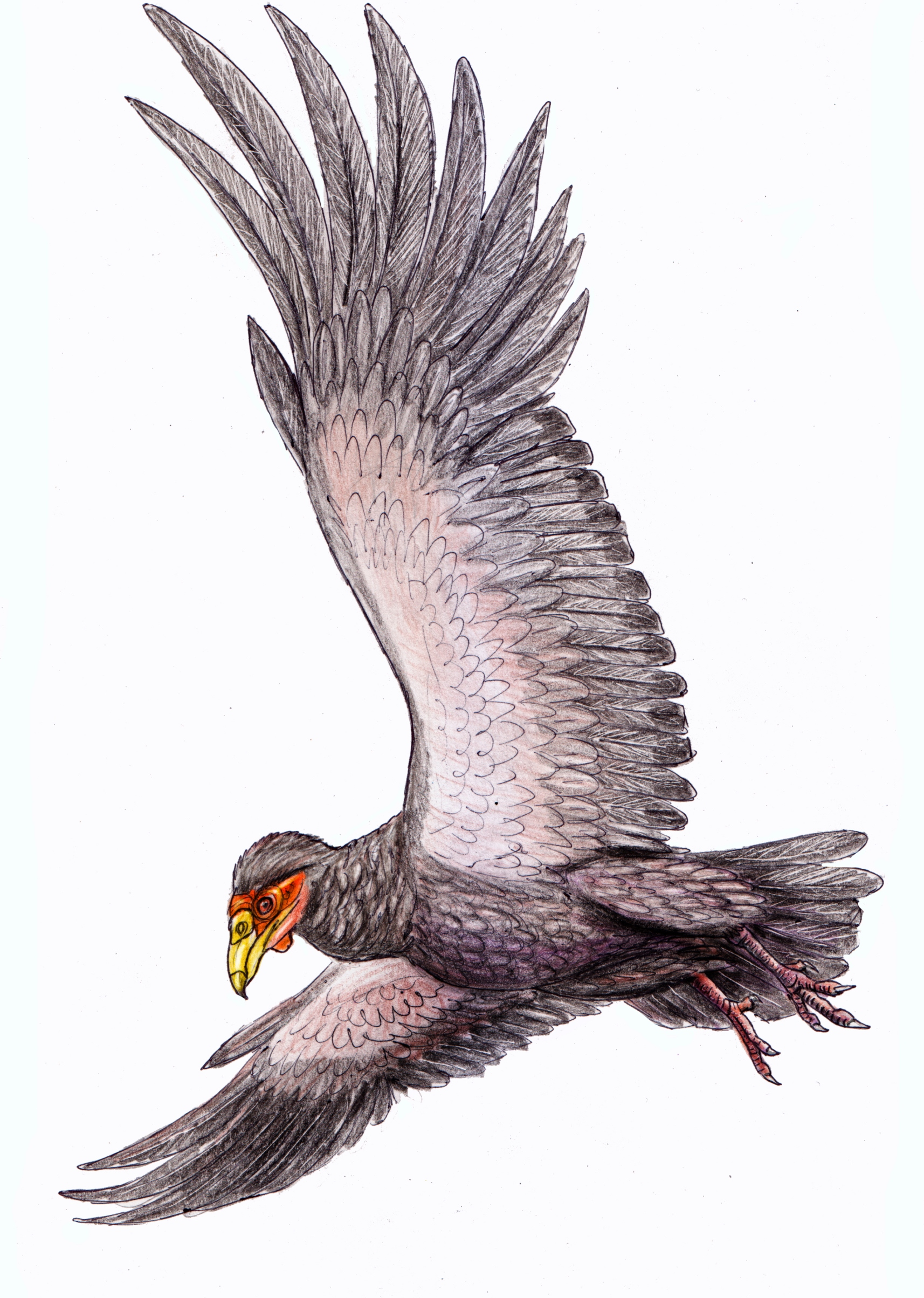
    Teratornis merriami
    - Merriam's teratorn, Teratornis merriami (Southwestern and Southeastern U.S.)
    - Woodburn teratorn,Teratornis woodburnensis (Northwestern U.S.)
  - †Aiolornis
    - Incredible teratorn, Aiolornis incredibilis (Western U.S.)
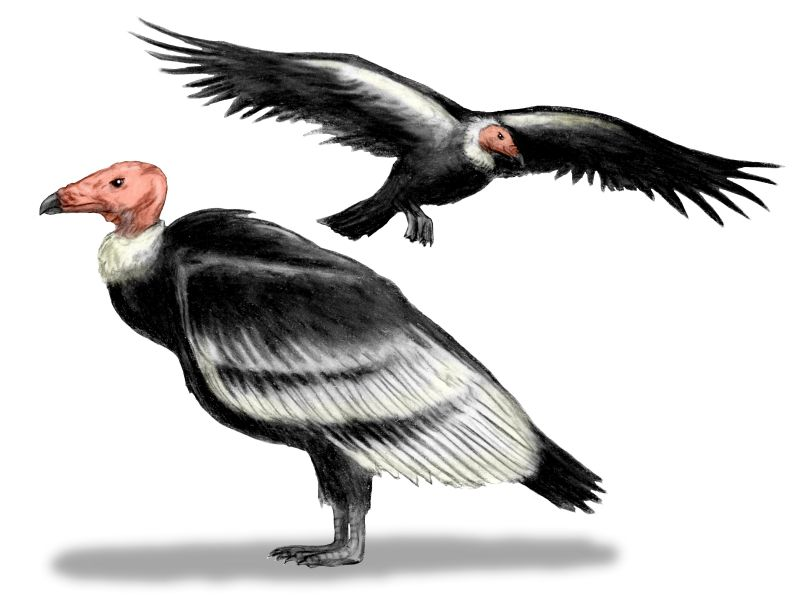
      Aiolornis incredibilis
  - †Oscaravis
    - Cuban teratorn, Oscaravis olsoni (Cuba, West Indies)
  - †Cathartornis
    - Cathartornis gracilis (California, U.S.)
- Cathartidae – New World vultures
  - †Pampagyps
    - Pampagyps imperator (Argentina, South America)
  - †Wingegyps
    - Winge's vulture, Wingegyps cartellei (Brazil, South America)
  - †Pleistovultur
    - Brazilian condor, Pleistovultur nevesi (Brazil, South America)
  - †Geronogyps
    - Pampas king vulture, Geronogyps reliquus (Peru and Argentina, South America)
  - †Breagyps
    - La Brea condor, Clark's condor or long-legged vulture, Breagyps clarki (Southwestern U.S.)
  - Extinct species of extant genera
    - Cathartes
      - Emslie's vulture, Cathartes emsliei (Cuba, West Indies)
    - Coragyps
      - Pleistocene black vulture, Coragyps occidentalis (Southwestern and Western U.S.)
      - Cuban black vulture, Coragyps seductus (Cuba, West Indies)
    - Gymnogyps
      - Ancestral condor, Gymnogyps amplus (California, North America)
      - Peruvian condor, Gymnogyps howardae (Peru, South America)
      - Florida condor, Gymnogyps kofordi (Florida, North America)
      - Cuban condor, Gymnogyps varonai (Cuba, West Indies)

== Phoenicopteriformes ==
The group that includes modern flamingos.

- Phoenicopteridae – flamingos
  - Extinct species of extant genera
    - Phoenicopterus
      - Cope's flamingo, Phoenicopterus copei (Late Pleistocene of Western North America and Central Mexico)
      - Minute flamingo, Phoenicopterus minutus (Late Pleistocene of California, U.S.)

== Mesitornithiformes ==
- Mesitornithidae – mesites
  - Extinct species of extant genera
    - Monias
      - Monias sp. (Madagascar)

== Columbiformes ==
- Columbidae – pigeons and doves
  - †Dysmoropelia
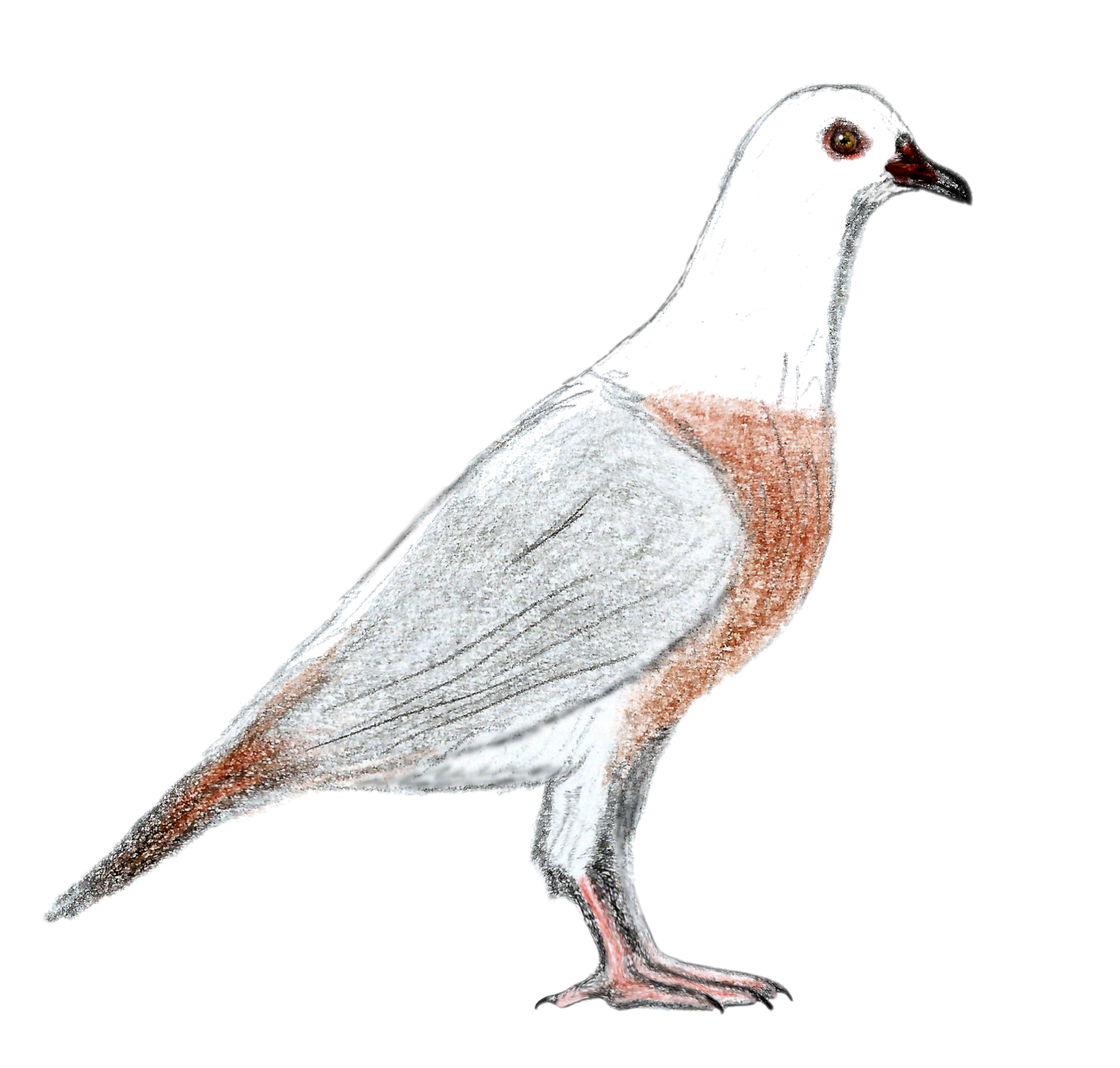
    Saint Helena dove (Dysmoropelia dekarchiskos)
    - Saint Helena dove, Dysmoropelia dekarchiskos (Saint Helena, South Atlantic) – known from Late Pleistocene subfossil bones, but may have persisted until the 16th century
  - †Natunaornis
    - Viti Levu giant pigeon, Natunaornis gigoura (Viti Levu, Fiji)
  - †Bountyphaps
    - Henderson Island archaic pigeon, Bountyphaps obsoleta (Henderson Island, South Pacific)
  - †Tongoenas
    - Tongan giant pigeon, Tongoenas burleyi (Tonga)
  - Extinct species of extant genera
    - Macropygia – cuckoo-doves
      - Huahine cuckoo-dove, Macropygia arevarevauupa (Huahine, Society Islands, South Pacific)
      - Marquesas cuckoo-dove, Macropygia heana (Marquesas Islands, South Pacific)
    - Geotrygon – quail-doves
      - Puerto Rican quail-dove, Geotrygon larva (Puerto Rico, West Indies)
    - Pampusana – ground doves
    - Great ground dove, Pampusana nui (Marquesas Islands and Cook Islands, South Pacific)
    - Henderson ground dove, Pampusana leonpascoi (Henderson Island, South Pacific)
    - New Caledonian ground dove, Pampusana longitarsus (New Caledonia, Melanesia)
    - Huahine ground dove, Pampusana sp. (Huahine, Society Islands, South Pacific) – P. nui?
    - Mangaia ground dove, Pampusana sp. (Mangaia, Cook Islands, South Pacific) – P. nui?
    - Rota ground dove, Pampusana sp. (Rota, Marianas, West Pacific)
    - Didunculus – tooth-billed pigeons
      - Tongan tooth-billed pigeon, Didunculus placopedetes (Tonga)
    - Caloenas
      - Kanaka pigeon, Caloenas canacorum (Tonga and New Caledonia, Melanesia)
    - Ducula – imperial pigeons
      - Henderson imperial pigeon, Ducula harrisoni (Henderson Island, South Pacific)
      - Lakeba imperial pigeon, Ducula lakeba (Lakeba, Fiji)
      - Steadman's imperial pigeon, Ducula david (ʻEua, Tonga, and Wallis Island)
      - Tongan imperial pigeon, Ducula sp. (ʻEua, Foa and Lifuka, Tonga) – may be synonymous with either D. lakeba or D. david, or may possibly be a new species altogether
      - Shutler's fruit pigeon, Ducula shutleri (Vavaʻu and Tongatapu, Tonga)
      - Ducula cf. galeata (Cook Islands, South Pacific) – possibly a new species
      - Ducula cf. galeata (Society Islands, South Pacific) – possibly a new species
      - Ducula sp. (Viti Levu, Fiji) – may be synonymous with D. lakeba
      - Ptilinopus – fruit doves or fruit pigeons
      - Tubuai fruit dove, Ptilinopus sp. (Tubuai, Austral Islands, South Pacific)
    - Columba – Old World pigeons
      - Maltese pigeon, Columba melitensis (Malta and Sicily, Mediterranean Sea)

== Cuculiformes ==
- Cuculidae – cuckoos
  - Extinct species of extant genera
    - Urodynamis
      - Henderson Island koel, Urodynamis cf. taitensis (Henderson Island, South Pacific) – most likely synonymous with the still-existing long-tailed koel (Urodynamis taitensis)
    - Coua – couas, a genus endemic to Madagascar
      - Ancient coua, Coua primaeva (Madagascar)
      - Bertha's coua, Coua berthae (Madagascar)
  - Extinct subspecies of extant species
    - Conkling's greater roadrunner, Geococcyx californianus conklingi (inland Southwestern North America)

== Accipitriformes ==
The group that includes birds of prey.

- Accipitridae – eagles, true hawks, buzzards, kites, harriers, and Old World vultures
  - †Bermuteo
    - Bermuda hawk, Bermuteo avivorus (Bermuda, West Atlantic)
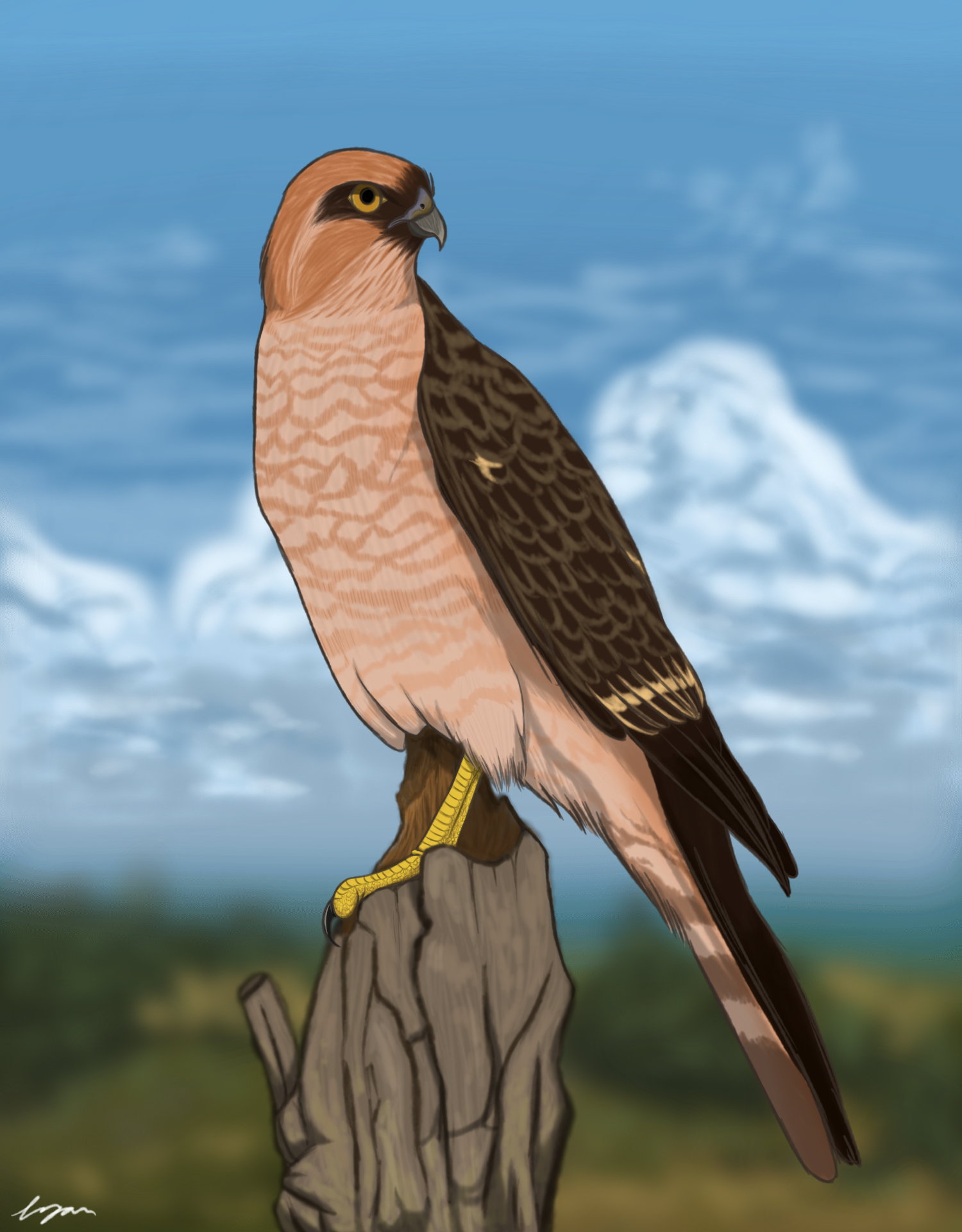
      Bermuda hawk (Bermuteo avivorus)
  - †Gigantohierax
    - Suárez's giant eagle, Gigantohierax suarezi (Cuba, West Indies)
    - Itche's giant eagle, Gigantohierax itchei (Cuba, West Indies)
  - †Titanohierax
    - Bahama eagle, Titanohierax gloveralleni (Bahamas, West Indies)
    - Titanohierax sp. (Hispaniola, West Indies)
  - †Neophrontops
    - Neophrontops americanus (Western North America)
  - †Neogyps
    - Neogyps errans (Western North America)
  - †Cryptogyps
    - Cryptogyps lacertosus (Australia)
  - Extinct species of extant genera
    - Powerful goshawk or greater New Caledonian goshawk, Tachyspiza efficax (New Caledonia, Melanesia)
    - Gracile goshawk or lesser New Caledonian goshawk, Tachyspiza quartus (New Caledonia, Melanesia)
    - Accipiter sp. 1 (New Ireland, Melanesia)
    - Accipiter sp. 2 (New Ireland, Melanesia) – one of these two extinct New Ireland species may actually be the still-existing Meyer's goshawk (Astur meyerianus)
    - Aquila sp. "large" (Madagascar)
    - Aquila sp. "small" (Madagascar)
    - Borrás's hawk, Buteogallus borrasi (Cuba, West Indies) – formerly in Aquila / Titanohierax
    - Daggett's eagle or walking eagle, Buteogallus daggetti (California and Mexico, North America)
    - Fragile eagle, Buteogallus fragilis (Cuba, West Indies) – formerly in Buteo / Geranoaetus
    - Buteogallus hibbardi (Peru, South America) – formerly in Amplibuteo
    - Wolf hawk, Buteogallus irpus (Cuba and the Dominican Republic, West Indies)
    - Buteogallus milleri (California, North America) – formerly in Buteo / Geranoaetus
    - Roy's hawk, Buteogallus royi (Cuba, West Indies)
    - Woodward's eagle, Buteogallus woodwardi (North America and the West Indies) – formerly in Amplibuteo
    - San Felipé's hawk, Buteo sanfelipensis (Cuba, West Indies)
    - Buteo quadratus (Bahamas, West Indies)
    - Buteo chimborazoensis (Ecuador, South America)
    - Buteo sanya (Luobidang Cave, Hainan, China)
    - Wood harrier or mime harrier, Circus dossenus (Molokaʻi, Hawaiian Islands)
    - Eyles's harrier, Circus teauteensis (New Zealand, Southwest Pacific)
    - Haast's eagle or Fuller's eagle, Hieraeetus moorei (South Island, New Zealand, Southwest Pacific)
    - Malagasy crowned eagle or Madagascar crowned hawk-eagle, Stephanoaetus mahery (Madagascar)
    - Maltese vulture, Gyps melitensis (Malta and Sicily, Mediterranean Sea)
  - Extinct subspecies of extant species
    - Liko Cave golden eagle, Aquila chrysaetos simurgh (Liko Cave, Crete, Mediterranean Sea) – sometimes considered a distinct species

== Caprimulgiformes ==
The group that includes nightjars and their relatives.

- Caprimulgidae – nightjars and allies
  - Extinct species of extant genera
    - Siphonorhis – Caribbean pauraques
      - Cuban pauraque, Siphonorhis daiquiri (Cuba, West Indies)

== Aegotheliformes ==
The group that includes owlet-nightjars.

- Aegothelidae – owlet-nightjars
  - Extinct species of extant genera
    - Aegotheles
      - New Zealand owlet-nightjar, Aegotheles novaezealandiae (New Zealand, Southwest Pacific) – formerly Megaegotheles novaezealandiae

== Apodiformes ==
The group that includes swifts and hummingbirds.

- Apodidae – swifts
  - Extinct species of extant genera
    - Aerodramus
      - Mangaia swiftlet, Aerodramus manuoi (Mangaia, Cook Islands, South Pacific) – formerly Collocalia manuoi

== Bucerotiformes ==
The group that includes hornbills and their relatives, formerly included in Coraciiformes (see below).

- Bucerotidae – hornbills
  - Extinct species of extant genera
    - Rhyticeros ("Aceros")
      - Lifou hornbill, Rhyticeros ("Aceros") sp. (Lifou, Loyalty Islands, South Pacific)

== Piciformes ==
The group that includes woodpeckers and their relatives.

- Picidae – woodpeckers
  - Extinct species of extant genera
    - Colaptes – flickers
      - Bermuda flicker, Colaptes oceanicus (Bermuda, West Atlantic) – known from Late Pleistocene and Holocene subfossil bones, but may have persisted until the 17th century

== Coraciiformes ==
- Brachypteraciidae – ground rollers
  - Extinct species of extant genera
    - Brachypteracias
      - Ampoza ground roller, Brachypteracias langrandi (Madagascar)

== Strigiformes ==
The group that includes both true owls and barn owls and bay owls.

- Strigidae – true owls
  - †Grallistrix – stilt-owls
    - Kauaʻi stilt-owl, Grallistrix auceps (Kauaʻi, Hawaiian Islands)
    - Maui stilt-owl, Grallistrix erdmani (Maui, Hawaiian Islands)
    - Molokaʻi stilt-owl, Grallistrix geleches (Molokaʻi, Hawaiian Islands)
    - Oʻahu stilt-owl, Grallistrix orion (Oʻahu, Hawaiian Islands)
  - †Ornimegalonyx
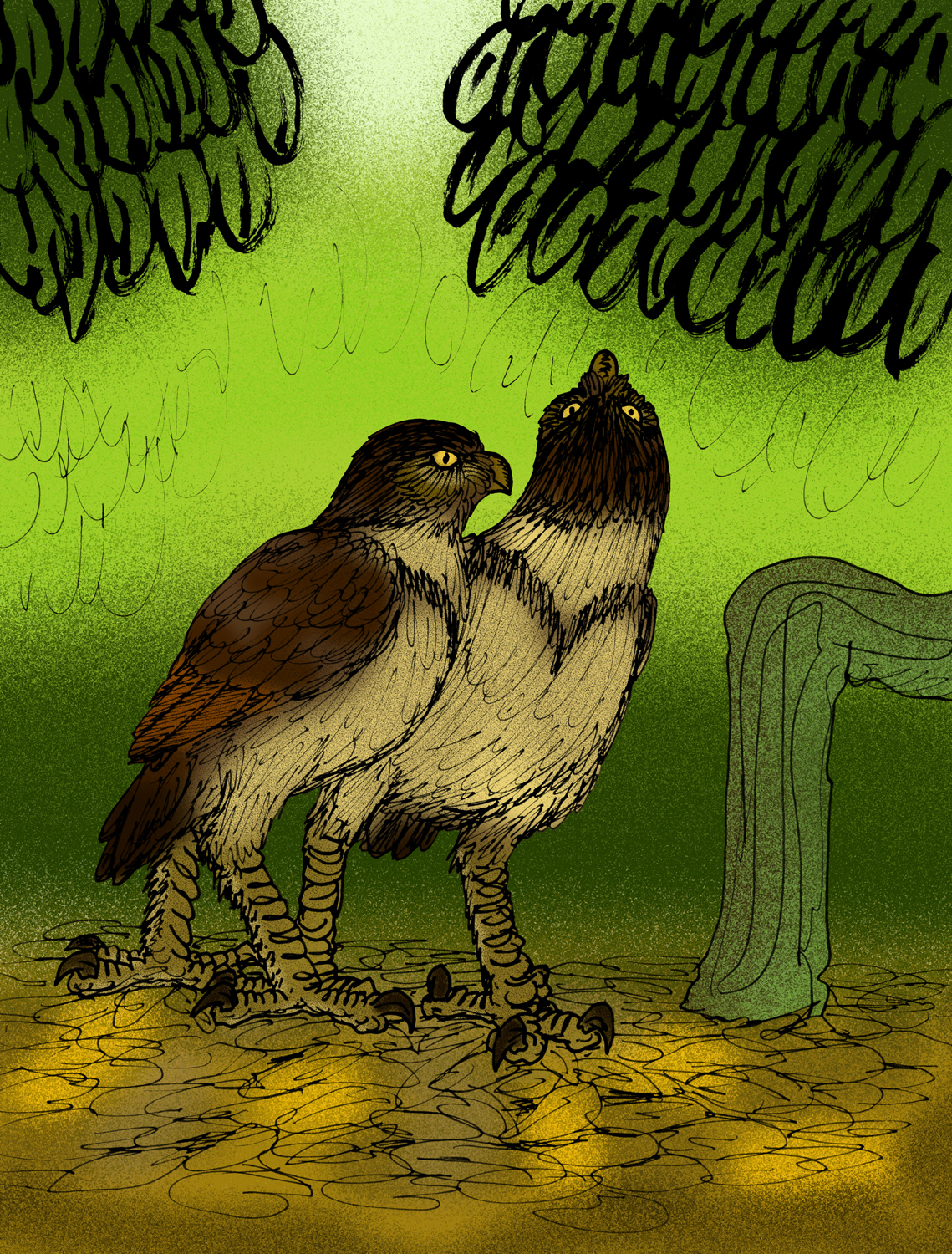
    Ornimegalonyx oteroi
    - Cuban giant owl or cursorial giant owl, Ornimegalonyx oteroi (Cuba, West Indies)
    - Ewing's giant owl, Ornimegalonyx ewingi (Cuba, West Indies)
  - †Asphaltoglaux
    - Asphalt miniature owl, Asphaltoglaux cecileae (Southern California, North America)
  - †Oraristrix
    - La Brea owl, Oraristrix brea (Southern California, North America)
  - Extinct species of extant genera
    - Bubo
      - Cuban horned owl or Osvaldo's owl, Bubo osvaldoi (Cuba, West Indies)
    - Athene
      - Cretan owl, Athene cretensis (Crete, Mediterranean Sea)
    - Ninox
      - New Caledonian boobook, Ninox cf. novaeseelandiae (New Caledonia, Melanesia) – possibly still exists
    - Otus – scops owls
      - Madeiran scops owl, Otus mauli (Madeira, East Atlantic)
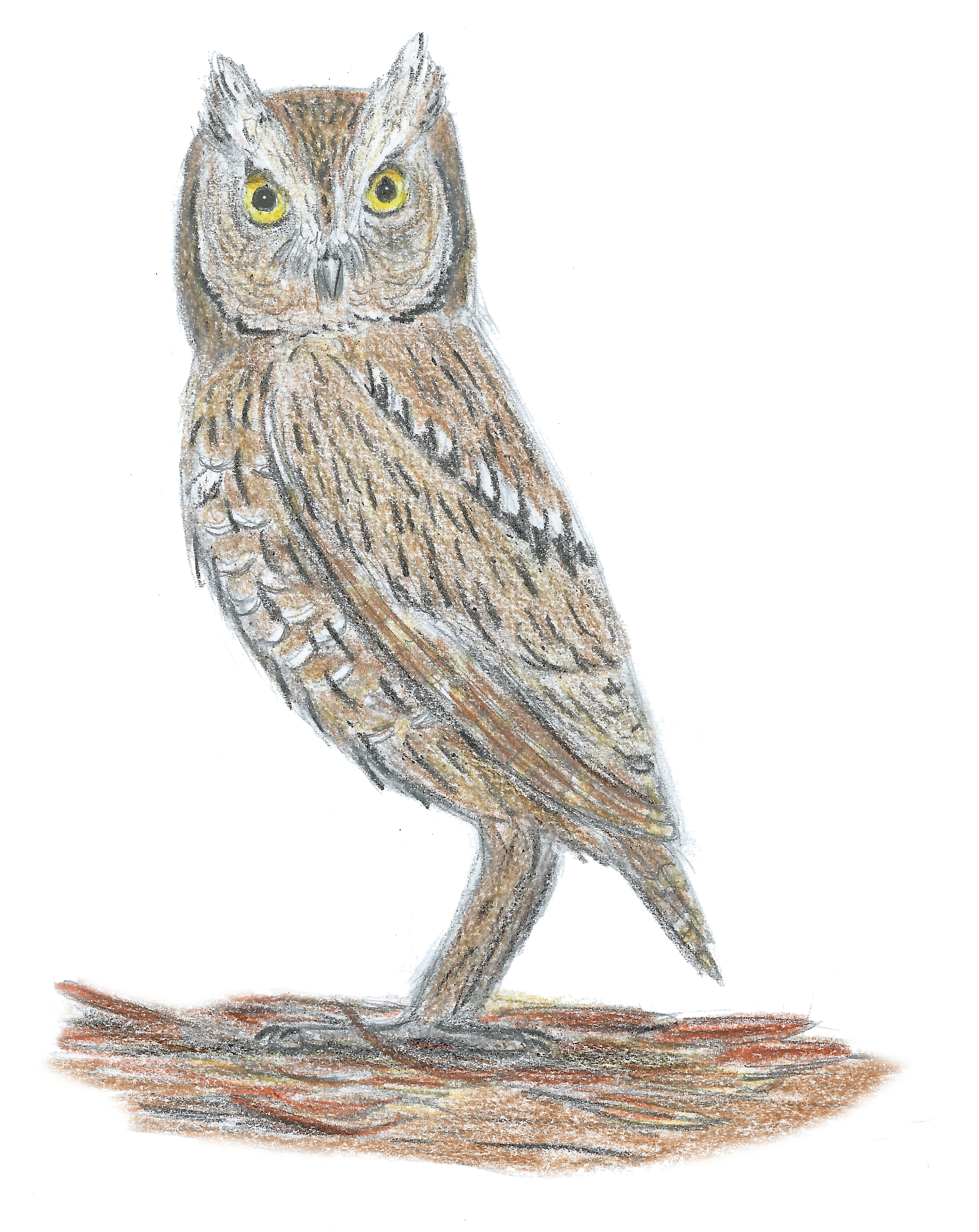
        Madeiran scops owl (Otus mauli)
      - São Miguel scops owl, Otus frutuosoi (Azores)
    - Glaucidium – pygmy owls
      - Kurochkin's pygmy owl, Glaucidium kurochkini (Southern California, North America)
    - Aegolius
      - Bermuda saw-whet owl, Aegolius gradyi (Bermuda, West Atlantic) – known from Pleistocene subfossil bones, but may have persisted until the early 1600s
    - Asio
      - Asio ecuadoriensis (Ecuador, South America)
    - Pulsatrix – spectacled owls
      - Cuban spectacled owl or Arredondo's owl, Pulsatrix arredondoi (Cuba, West Indies)
  - Placement unresolved
    - Strigidae gen. et sp. indet. (Ibiza, Mediterranean Sea)
- Tytonidae – barn owls and bay owls
  - Extinct species of extant genera
    - Tyto
      - Puerto Rican barn owl, Tyto cavatica (Puerto Rico, West Indies) – may have still existed up to 1912, given reports of the presence of cave-nesting owls on Puerto Rico up to that year; likely a subspecies of, or synonymous with, the still-existing ashy-faced owl (Tyto glaucops)
      - Cuban dwarf barn owl, Tyto maniola (Cuba, West Indies)
      - New Caledonian barn owl, Tyto letocarti (New Caledonia, Melanesia)
      - Maltese barn owl, Tyto melitensis (Malta and Sicily, Mediterranean Sea) – possibly a paleosubspecies of, or synonymous with, the still-existing western barn owl (Tyto alba)
      - Noel's giant barn owl, Tyto noeli (Cuba, Barbuda, West Indies) – Tyto neddi is a junior synonym
      - Craves's giant barn owl, Tyto cravesae (Cuba, West Indies)
      - Hispaniolan barn owl, Tyto ostologa (Hispaniola, West Indies)
      - Bahama giant barn owl, Tyto pollens (Little Exuma and New Providence, Bahamas, West Indies) – Rivero's barn owl (Tyto riveroi) is a junior synonym
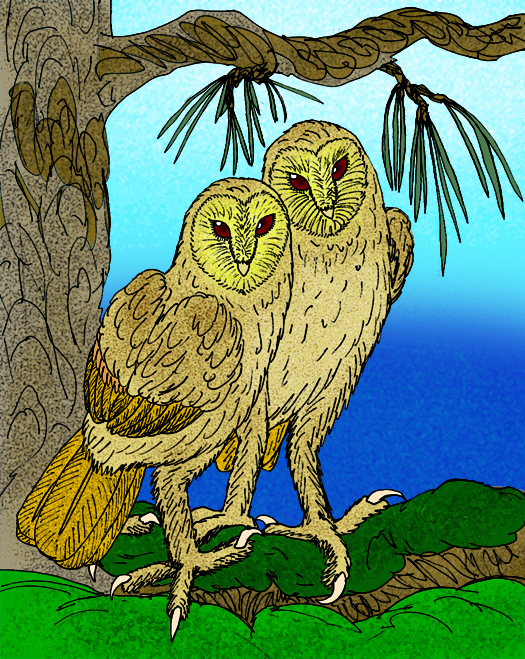
        Tyto pollens
      - Antiguan barn owl Tyto sp. (Antigua, West Indies)
      - Mussau barn owl, Tyto cf. novaehollandiae (Mussau, Melanesia)
      - Greater New Ireland barn owl, Tyto cf. novaehollandiae (New Ireland, Melanesia)
      - Lesser New Ireland barn owl, Tyto cf. alba / aurantiaca (New Ireland, Melanesia)

== Falconiformes ==
- Falconidae – true falcons and caracaras
  - Extinct species of extant genera
    - Caracara
      - Puerto Rican caracara, Caracara latebrosus (Puerto Rico, West Indies)
      - Bahaman caracara or Creighton's caracara, Caracara creightoni (Bahamas and Cuba, West Indies) – may be synomynous with Caracara latebrosus
      - Jamaican caracara or terrestrial caracara, Caracara tellustris (Jamaica, West Indies)
      - La Brea caracara or early caracara, Caracara prelutosa (Rancho La Brea and San Miguel Island, California, North America)
      - Caracara major (Uruguay, South America)
      - Seymour's caracara, Caracara seymouri (Peru and Ecuador, South America)
    - Daptrius
      - Cuban caracara, Daptrius carbo (Cuba, West Indies)
      - Diaz Franco's caracara, Daptrius diazfrancoi (Cuba, West Indies)
      - ?Daptrius sp. (Jamaica, West Indies)
      - Hispaniolan caracara, Daptrius alexandri (Hispaniola, West Indies)
      - Daptrius brodkorbi (Peru, South America)
      - Daptrius napieri (West Point Island, Falkland Islands, South America)
    - Falco
      - Cuban kestrel, Falco kurochkini (Cuba, West Indies) – may have survived until the 17th century
  - Extinct subspecies of extant species
    - Daptrius chimachima readei (Florida and possibly elsewhere, North America)

== Psittaciformes ==
- Strigopidae – New Zealand parrots
  - Extinct species of extant genera
    - Nestor
      - Chatham kākā, Nestor chathamensis (Chatham Islands, Southwest Pacific)
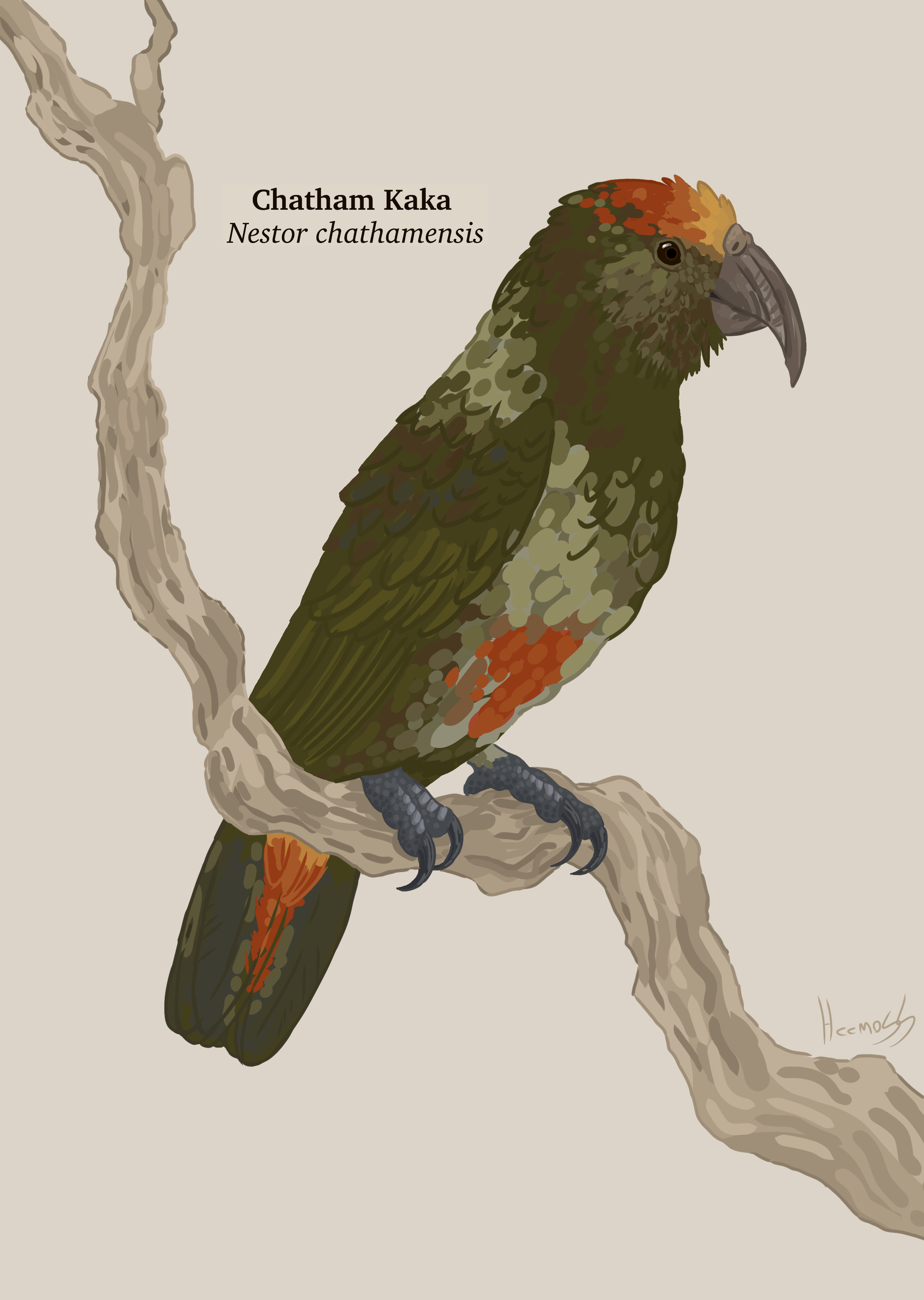
        Chatham kākā (Nestor chathamensis)
- Cacatuidae – cockatoos
  - Extinct species of extant genera
    - Cacatua
      - New Caledonian cockatoo, Cacatua sp. (New Caledonia, Melanesia)
      - New Ireland cockatoo, Cacatua sp. (New Ireland, Melanesia)
- Psittacidae – parrots, parakeets, lories and lorikeets
  - Extinct species of extant genera
    - Saint Croix macaw or Puerto Rican macaw, Ara autocthones (Puerto Rico and Saint Croix, West Indies)
    - Oceanic eclectus, Eclectus infectus (Tonga, Vanuatu and possibly Fiji) – may have survived until the 18th century or even much later than that
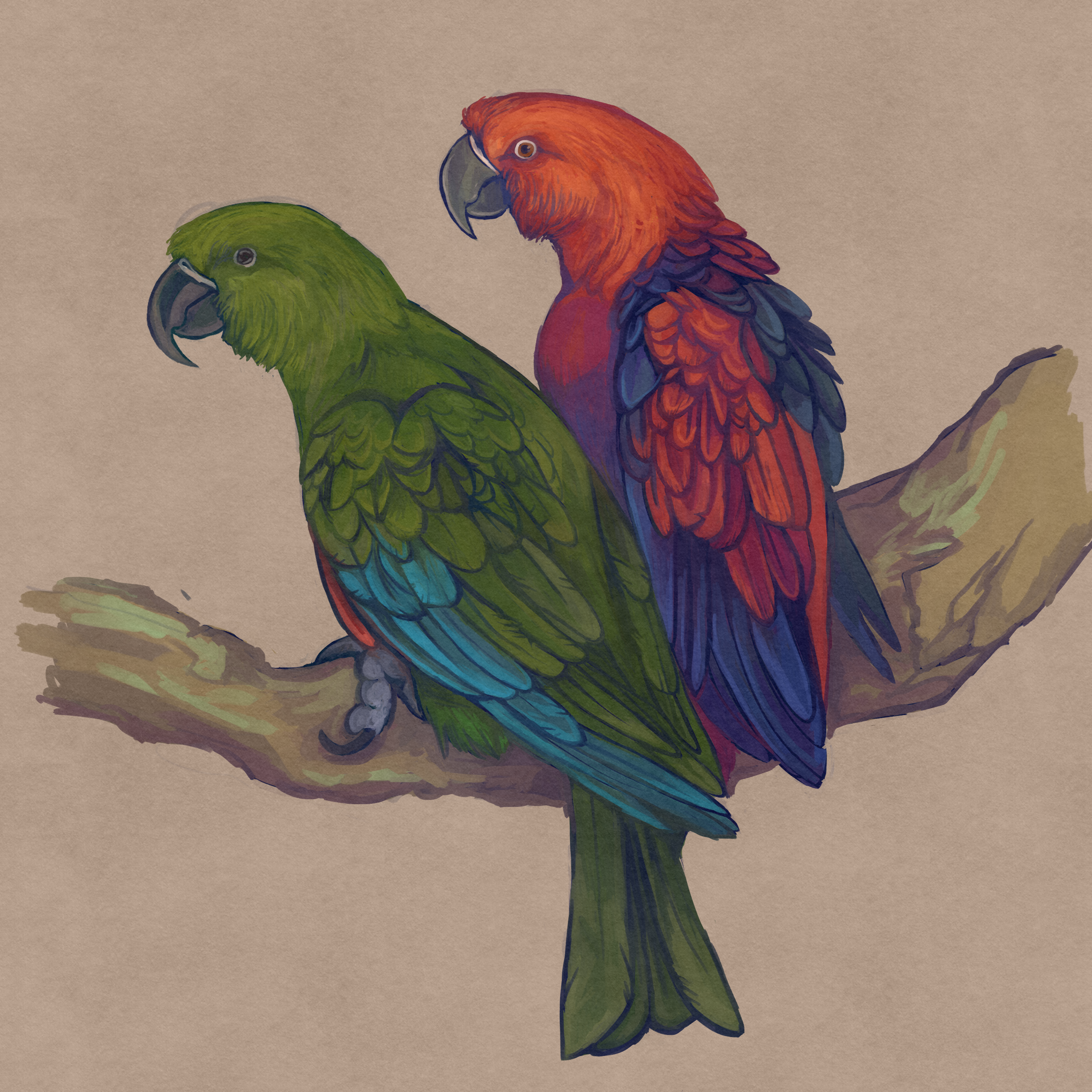
      Oceanic eclectus (Eclectus infectus)
    - Sinoto's lorikeet, Vini sinotoi (Marquesas Islands, South Pacific)
    - Conquered lorikeet, Vini vidivici (Mangaia, Cook Islands, South Pacific, Huahine, Society Islands, South Pacific and Hiva Oa, Nuku Hiva, Ua Huka and Tahuata, Marquesas Islands, South Pacific)
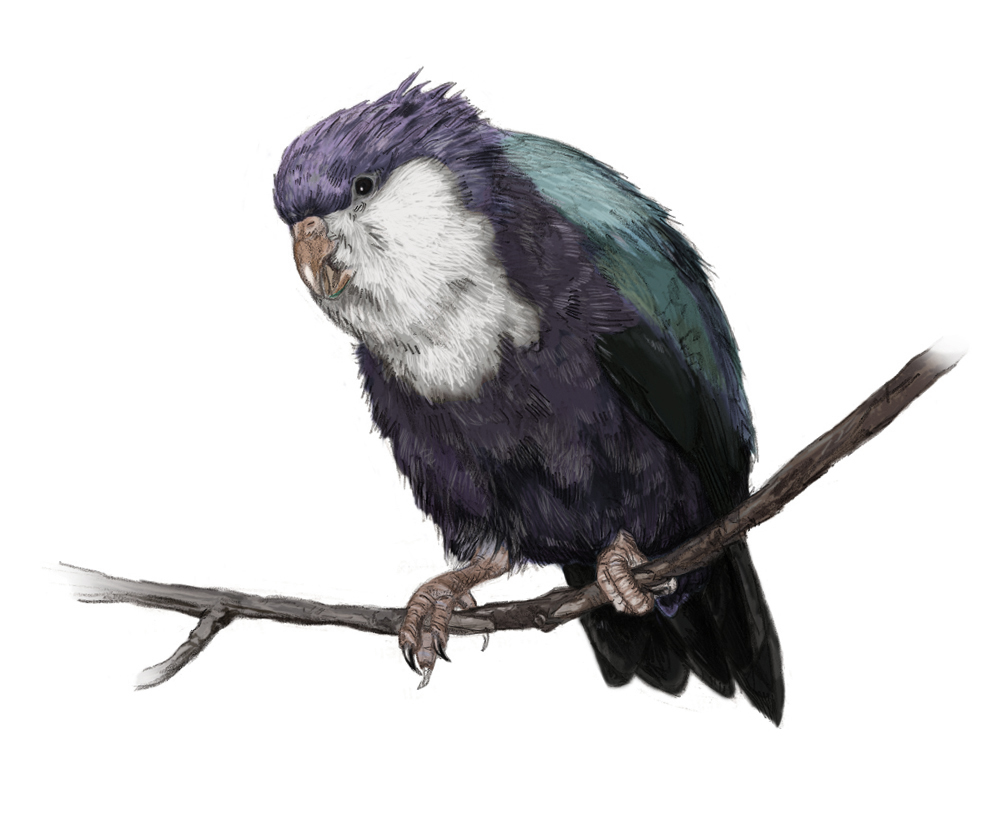
      Conquered lorikeet (Vini vidivici)
    - Campbell parakeet, Cyanoramphus sp. (Campbell Island, New Zealand, Southwest Pacific)
  - Extinct subspecies of extant species
    - Virgin Islands amazon, Amazona vittata ssp. indet. (Virgin Islands, West Indies)
  - Placement unresolved
    - Psittacidae gen. et sp. indet. 1 (Easter Island, Southeast Pacific)
    - Psittacidae gen. et sp. indet. 2 (Easter Island, Southeast Pacific)
    - Psittacidae gen. et sp. indet. (Guam, Marianas, West Pacific) – cf. Trichoglossus / Vini?
    - Psittacidae gen. et sp. indet. (Rota, Marianas, West Pacific) – cf. Cacatua / Eclectus?

== Passeriformes ==
The group that includes perching birds.

- Placement unresolved
  - Slender-billed Kauaʻi passerine, Passeriformes gen. et sp. indet. (Kauaʻi, Hawaiian Islands)
  - Tiny Kauaʻi passerine, Passeriformes gen. et sp. indet. (Kauaʻi, Hawaiian Islands)
- Acanthisittidae – New Zealand wrens
  - †Xenicus
    - South Island stout-legged wren, Xenicus yaldwyni (North Island, New Zealand, Southwest Pacific)
    - North Island stout-legged wren, Xenicus jagmi (South Island, New Zealand, Southwest Pacific) – possibly a subspecies of X. yaldwyni
  - †Dendroscansor
    - Long-billed wren, Dendroscansor decurvirostris (South Island, New Zealand, Southwest Pacific)
  - Extinct subspecies of extant species
    - North Island rock wren, Xenicus gilviventris ssp. nov. (North Island, New Zealand, Southwest Pacific) – a subspecies of the New Zealand rock wren (X. gilviventris)
- Corvidae – crows, ravens, jays and magpies
  - Extinct species of extant genera
    - Corvus – crows, ravens and rooks
      - High-billed crow, Corvus impluviatus (Oʻahu, Hawaiian Islands)
      - Robust crow, Corvus viriosus (Oʻahu and Molokaʻi, Hawaiian Islands)
      - New Zealand raven, Corvus moriorum (New Zealand and the Chatham Islands, Southwest Pacific)
        - Chatham raven, Corvus moriorum moriorum (Chatham Islands, Southwest Pacific)
        - North Island raven, Corvus moriorum antipodum (North Island, New Zealand, Southwest Pacific)
        - South Island raven, Corvus moriorum pycrafti (South Island, New Zealand, Southwest Pacific)
      - New Ireland crow, Corvus sp. (New Ireland, Melanesia)
      - Puerto Rican crow, Corvus pumilis (Puerto Rico and Saint Croix, West Indies) – probably a subspecies of either the Cuban crow (Corvus nasicus) or the Hispaniolan palm crow (Corvus palmarum)
- Hirundinidae – swallows and martins
  - Extinct subspecies of extant species
    - Henderson Island Pacific swallow, Hirundo tahitensis ssp. nov. (Henderson Island, South Pacific)
- Cettiidae – cettiid warblers or typical bush warblers
  - Extinct species of extant genera
    - Horornis
      - ʻEua bush warbler, Horornis sp. (ʻEua, Tonga)
- Zosteropidae – white-eyes
  - Placement unresolved
    - Tongan large white-eye, Zosteropidae gen. et sp. indet. (ʻEua, Tonga)
    - Guam large white-eye, Zosteropidae gen. et sp. indet. (Guam, Marianas, West Pacific)
- Sturnidae – starlings
- †Cryptopsar
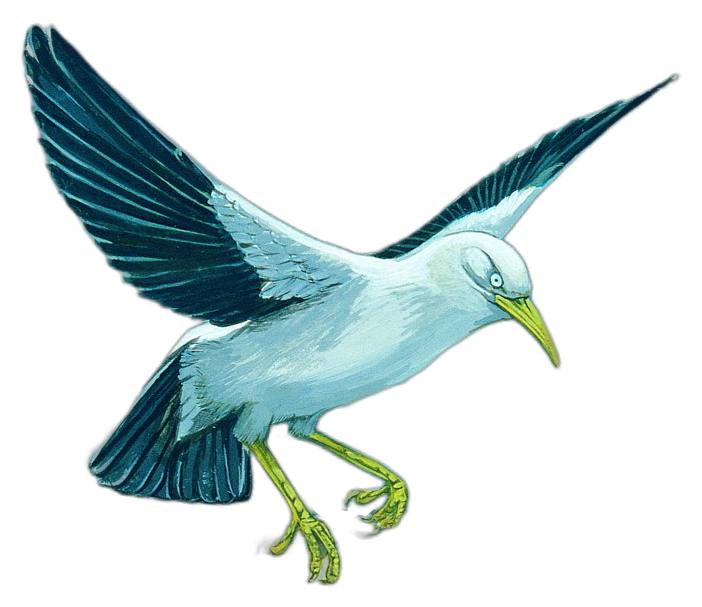
  Mauritius starling (Cryptopsar ischyrhynchus)
  - Mauritius starling, Cryptopsar ischyrhynchus (Mauritius, Mascarenes)
    - Extinct species of extant genera
      - Aplonis
        - Huahine starling, Aplonis diluvialis (Huahine, Society Islands, South Pacific)
        - Erromango starling, Aplonis sp. (Erromango, Vanuatu)
- Turdidae – thrushes
  - †Meridiocichla
    - Meridiocichla salotti (Corsica, Mediterranean Sea)
- Mohoidae – Hawaiian honeyeaters
  - Prehistorically extinct species of recently extinct genera
    - Oʻahu kioea, Chaetoptila cf. angustipluma (Oʻahu and Maui, Hawaiian Islands)
    - Narrow-billed kioea, ?Chaetoptila sp. (Maui, Hawaiian Islands)
- Fringillidae – true finches and Hawaiian honeycreepers
  - †Orthiospiza
    - Highland finch, Orthiospiza howarthi (Maui, Hawaiian Islands)
  - †Xestospiza
    - Cone-billed finch, Xestospiza conica (Kauaʻi and Oʻahu, Hawaiian Islands)
    - Ridge-billed finch, Xestospiza fastigialis (Oʻahu, Maui and Molokaʻi, Hawaiian Islands)
  - †Vangulifer
    - Strange-billed finch, Vangulifer mirandus (Maui, Hawaiian Islands)
    - Thin-billed finch, Vangulifer neophasis (Maui, Hawaiian Islands)
  - †Aidemedia
    - Oʻahu icterid-like gaper, Aidemedia chascax (Oʻahu, Hawaiian Islands)
    - Sickle-billed gaper, Aidemedia zanclops (Oʻahu, Hawaiian Islands)
    - Maui Nui icterid-like gaper, Aidemedia lutetiae (Maui and Molokaʻi, Hawaiian Islands)
  - Prehistorically extinct species of extant and recently extinct genera
    - Chloris – greenfinches
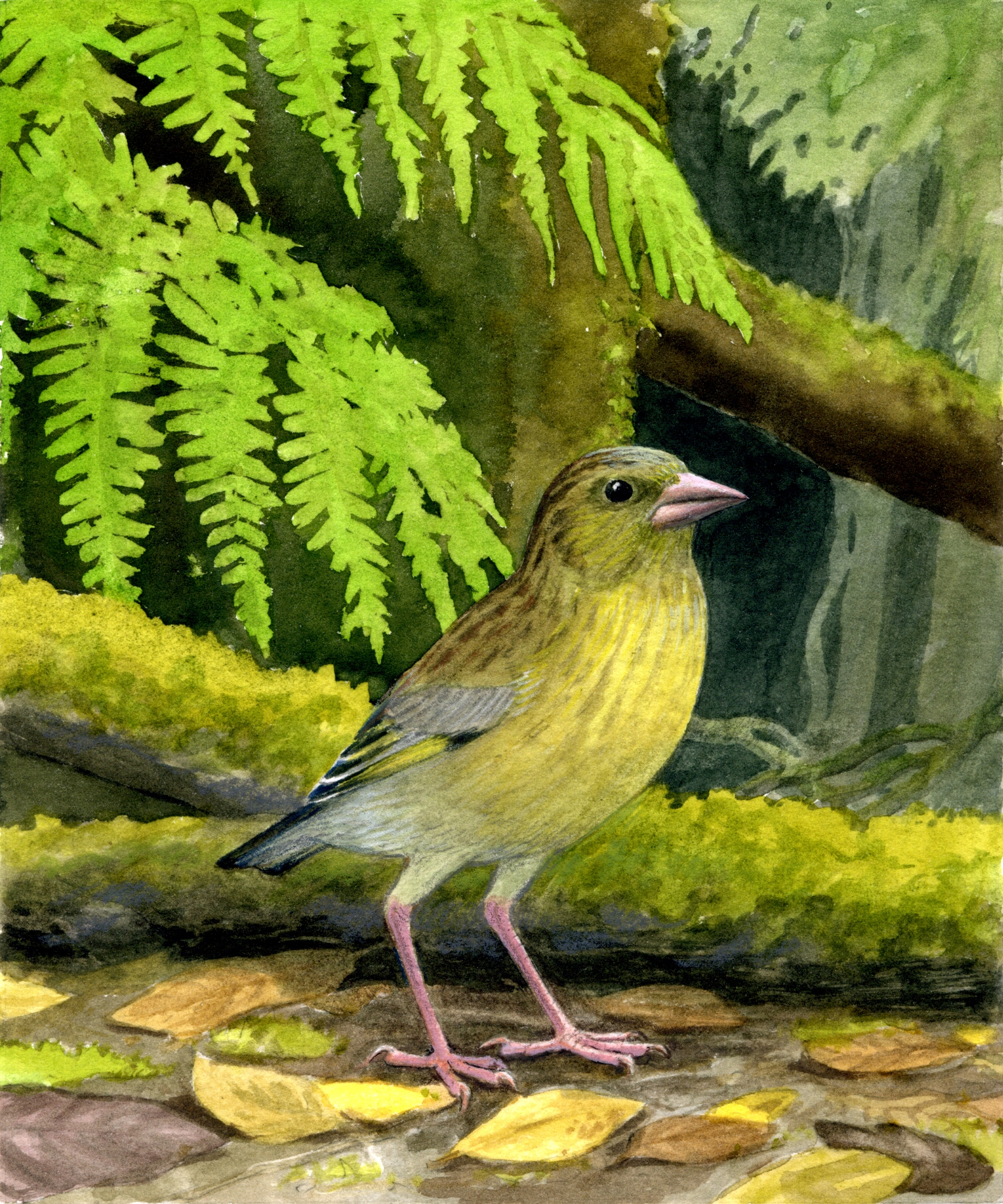
      Slender-billed greenfinch (Chloris aurelioi)
      - Slender-billed greenfinch, Chloris aurelioi (Tenerife, Canary Islands, East Atlantic)
      - Trias's greenfinch, Chloris triasi (La Palma, Canary Islands, East Atlantic)
    - Pyrrhula – bullfinches
      - Greater Azores bullfinch, Pyrrhula crassa (Graciosa, Azores)
    - Kauaʻi finch, Telespiza persecutrix (Kauaʻi and Oʻahu, Hawaiian Islands)
    - Maui Nui finch, Telespiza ypsilon (Maui and Molokaʻi, Hawaiian Islands)
    - Maui finch, Telespiza cf. ypsilon (Maui, Hawaiian Islands)
    - Kauaʻi palila, Loxioides kikuichi (Kauaʻi, Hawaiian Islands) – possibly survived until the early 18th century
    - Scissor-billed koa finch, Rhodacanthis forfex (Kauaʻi and Maui, Hawaiian Islands)
    - Primitive koa finch, Rhodacanthis litotes (Oʻahu and Maui, Hawaiian Islands)
    - Wahi grosbeak, Chloridops wahi (Oʻahu and Maui, Hawaiian Islands)
    - King Kong grosbeak, Chloridops regiskongi (Oʻahu, Hawaiian Islands)
    - Kauaʻi grosbeak, Chloridops sp. (Kauaʻi, Hawaiian Islands) – may be synomynous with C. wahi
    - Maui grosbeak, Chloridops sp. (Maui, Hawaiian Islands)
    - Giant nukupuʻu, Hemignathus vorpalis (Big Island, Hawaiian Islands)
    - Hoopoe-billed ʻakialoa, Akialoa upupirostris (Kauaʻi and Oʻahu, Hawaiian Islands)
    - Giant ʻakialoa, Akialoa sp. (Big Island, Hawaiian Islands)
    - Akialoa sp. (Maui, Hawaiian Islands)
    - Stout-legged finch, Ciridops tenax (Kauaʻi, Hawaiian Islands)
    - Molokaʻi ʻula-ʻai-hawane, Ciridops cf. anna (Molokaʻi, Hawaiian Islands)
    - Oʻahu ʻula-ʻai-hawane, Ciridops sp. (Oʻahu, Hawaiian Islands)
  - Placement unresolved
    - Drepanidini gen. et sp. indet. (Maui, Hawaiian Islands) – at least three species
    - Drepanidini gen. et sp. indet. (Oʻahu, Hawaiian Islands)
- Estrildidae – waxbills
  - Extinct species of extant genera
    - Erythrura – parrotfinches
      - Marianas parrotfinch, Erythrura sp. (Guam and Rota, Marianas, West Pacific)
- Emberizidae – Old World buntings
  - Extinct species of extant genera
    - Emberiza
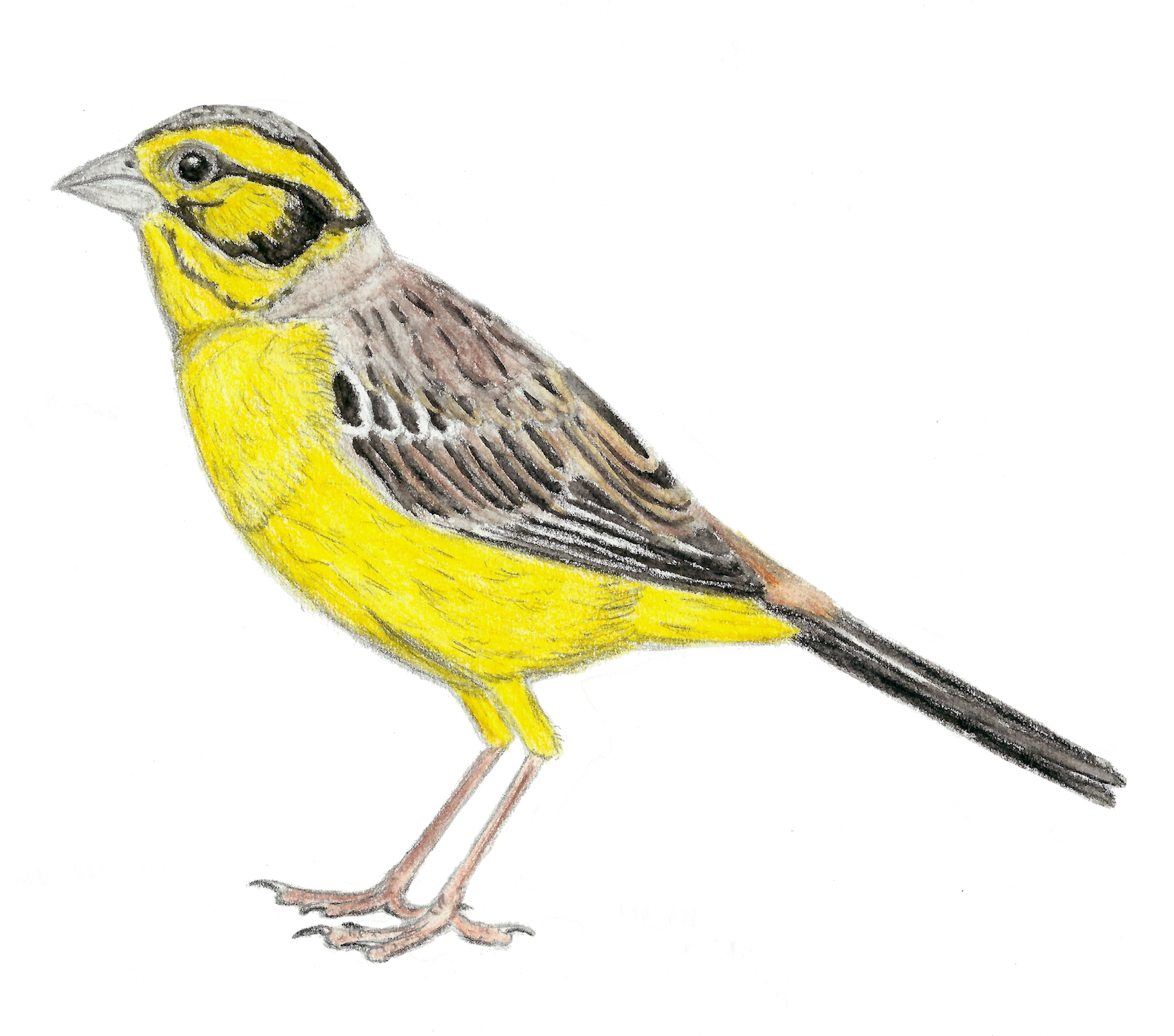
      Long-legged bunting (Emberiza alcoveri)
      - Long-legged bunting, Emberiza alcoveri (Tenerife, Canary Islands, East Atlantic)
- Passerellidae – New World sparrows
  - †Pedinorhis
    - Puerto Rican obscure bunting, Pedinorhis stirpsarcana (Puerto Rico, West Indies)
- Icteridae – New World blackbirds and allies
  - †Pandanaris
    - Convex-billed cowbird, Pandanaris convexa (California and Florida south through Mexico to South America)
  - Extinct species of extant genera
    - Euphagus
      - Large-billed blackbird or big-billed blackbird, Euphagus magnirostris (California south to South America)
    - Molothrus – cowbirds
      - Talara cowbird, Molothrus resinosus (Peru, South America)
    - Icterus – New World orioles
      - Talara troupial, Icterus turmalis (Peru, South America)

== Taxonomic list of Late Quaternary extinct/possibly extinct/status unknown prehistoric birds ==
All of these birds are in Neornithes.

== Struthioniformes ==
The ostriches

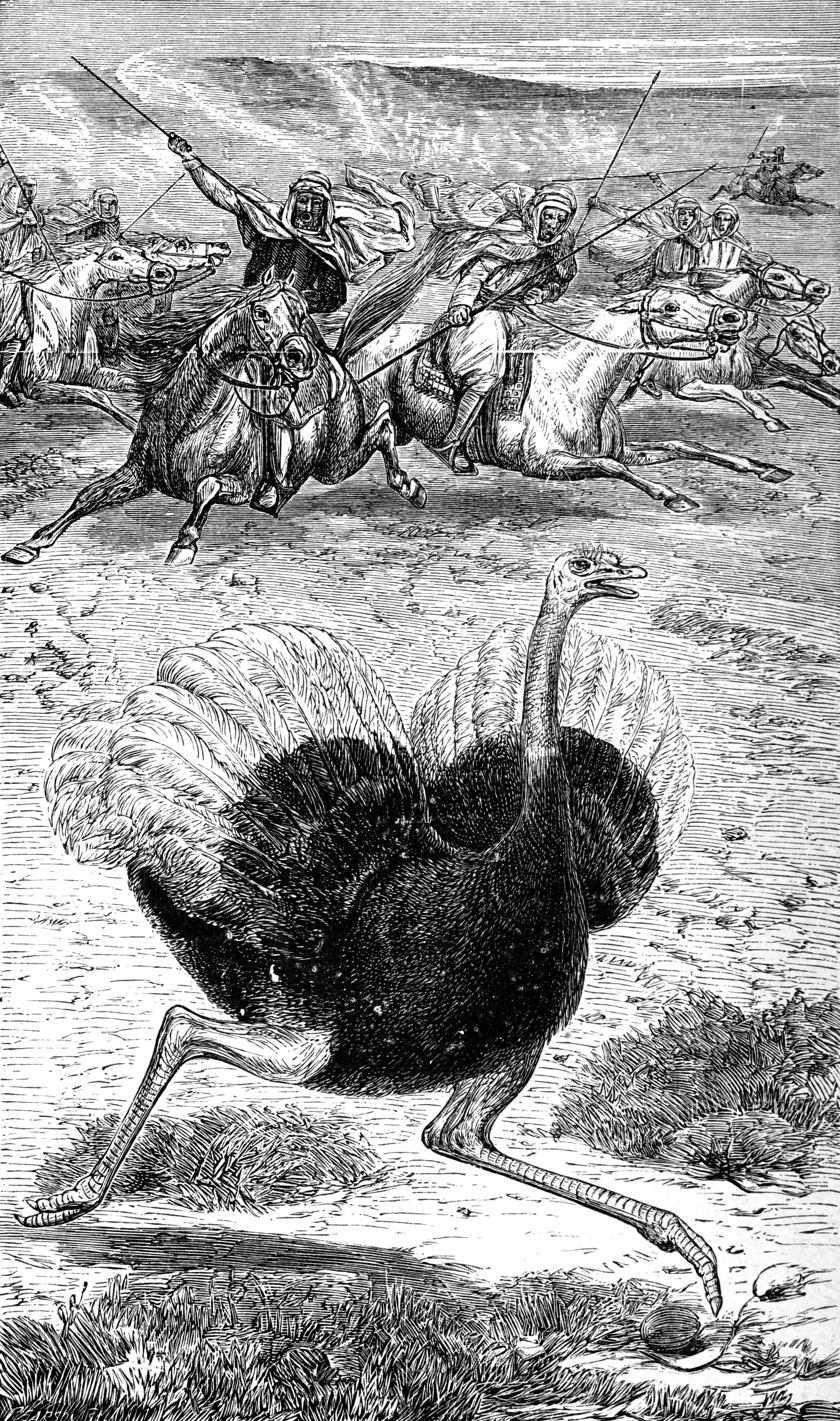
Arabian ostrich (Struthio camelus syriacus)

- Struthionidae – ostriches
  - Extinct subspecies of extant species
    - Arabian ostrich, Syrian ostrich, or Middle Eastern ostrich, Struthio camelus syriacus (Arabian Peninsula and Near East, West Asia) – survived until the 20th century

== Anseriformes ==
The group that includes modern ducks, geese, swans, and screamers.

- Anatidae – ducks, geese and swans
  - Extinct species of extant genera
  - Aythyini – diving ducks
    - Aythya
      - Réunion pochard, Aythya sp. (Réunion, Mascarenes) - may have survived until the 17th/18th centuries
  - Anatini – dabbling ducks
    - Mareca
      - Amsterdam wigeon, Mareca marecula (Amsterdam Island, Saint Paul and Amsterdam Islands) - may have survived until the late 17th century
      - St. Paul Island duck, Mareca sp. (Saint Paul Island, Saint Paul and Amsterdam Islands) - may have survived until the 18th century or even much later than that, may be synonymous with the Amsterdam wigeon or a distinct species or subspecies

== Charadriiformes ==
The group that includes waders, gulls and auks.

- Burhinidae – stone-curlews
  - Extinct species of extant genera
    - Burhinus
      - Dwarf thick-knee, Burhinus nanus (Bahamas, West Indies) – may have survived until the 17th century

== Gruiformes ==
The group that includes rails and cranes, probably paraphyletic.

- Rallidae – true rails
  - †Aphanocrex
    - Saint Helena rail, Aphanocrex podarces (Saint Helena, South Atlantic)
  - †Diaphorapteryx
    - Hawkins's rail, Diaphorapteryx hawkinsi (Chatham Islands, Southwest Pacific) - may have survived until the late 19th century
  - Extinct species of extant genera
    - Dryolimnas
      - Cheke's wood rail, Dryolimnas chekei (Mauritius, Mascarenes) - may have survived until the 17th century

== Procellariiformes ==
The group that includes albatrosses, shearwaters, petrels and storm petrels.

- Procellariidae – petrels
  - Extinct species of extant genera
    - Bulweria
      - Olson's petrel, Bulweria bifax (Saint Helena, South Atlantic) – may have survived until the 17th century
    - Pterodroma
      - Saint Helena petrel, Pterodroma rupinarum (Saint Helena, South Atlantic) – may have survived until the 17th century
      - Bourne's petrel, Pterodroma sp. (Rodrigues, Mascarenes) - may have survived until the 18th century

== Suliformes ==
The group that includes frigatebirds, boobies, gannets, cormorants and darters.

- Sulidae – boobies and gannets
  - Extinct species of extant species
    - Mascarene booby, Papasula sp. (Mauritius and Rodrigues, Mascarenes) – may have survived until the 19th century

== Passeriformes ==
The group that includes perching birds.

- Pycnonotidae – bulbuls
  - Extinct species of extant genera
    - Hypsipetes
      - Rodrigues bulbul, Hypsipetes cowlesi (Rodrigues, Mascarenes)
- Turdidae – thrushes and allies
  - Extinct species of extant genera
    - Myadestes
      - Olomaʻo, Myadestes lanaiensis (Maui, Lānaʻi, and Molokaʻi, Hawaiian Islands) – may have survived until the late 19th century
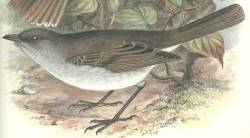
        Olomaʻo (Myadestes lanaiensis)
- Passerellidae – New World sparrows
  - Extinct species of extant genera
    - Pipilo
      - Bermuda towhee, Pipilo naufragus (Bermuda, West Atlantic) - may have survived until the 17th century

== See also ==
- List of extinct bird species since 1500
- List of fossil bird genera
- Lists of extinct species
- Flightless bird
- Holocene extinction event
- Prehistoric life
