= Xestospiza =

Xestospiza Temporal range: Early Holocene

Scientific classification
- Kingdom: Animalia
- Phylum: Chordata
- Class: Aves
- Order: Passeriformes
- Family: Fringillidae
- Subfamily: Carduelinae
- Genus: †Xestospiza; Olson & James, 1991

Species
- Xestospiza conica Xestospiza fastigialis

Extinct genus of birds

Xestospiza is an extinct genus of containing two species of Hawaiian honeycreeper with cone-shaped bills that were described on the basis of bones. They were possibly insectivores. It consists of the following:

- Cone-billed finch (Xestospiza conica) – prehistoric
- Ridge-billed finch (Xestospiza fastigialis) – prehistoric
