= Xestospiza fastigialis =

Xestospiza fastigialis Temporal range: Early Holocene

Scientific classification
- Kingdom: Animalia
- Phylum: Chordata
- Class: Aves
- Order: Passeriformes
- Family: Fringillidae
- Subfamily: Carduelinae
- Genus: †Xestospiza
- Species: †X. fastigialis

Binomial name
- †Xestospiza fastigialis Olson & James, 1991

Extinct species of bird

Xestospiza fastigialis is an extinct species of bird with a ridge-shape bill that was described on the basis of fossils. It was possibly an insectivore, populating the Hawaiian Islands of Oahu, Molokai and Maui.

== See also ==
- Xestospiza conica
