= Xestospiza conica =

Xestospiza conica Temporal range: Early Holocene

Scientific classification
- Kingdom: Animalia
- Phylum: Chordata
- Class: Aves
- Order: Passeriformes
- Family: Fringillidae
- Subfamily: Carduelinae
- Genus: †Xestospiza
- Species: †X. conica

Binomial name
- †Xestospiza conica Olson & James, 1991

Extinct species of bird

Xestospiza conica is an extinct species of bird with a cone-shaped bill that was described on the basis of fossils. It was possibly an insectivore, populating the Hawaiian Island of Kauai.

== See also ==
- Xestospiza fastigialis
