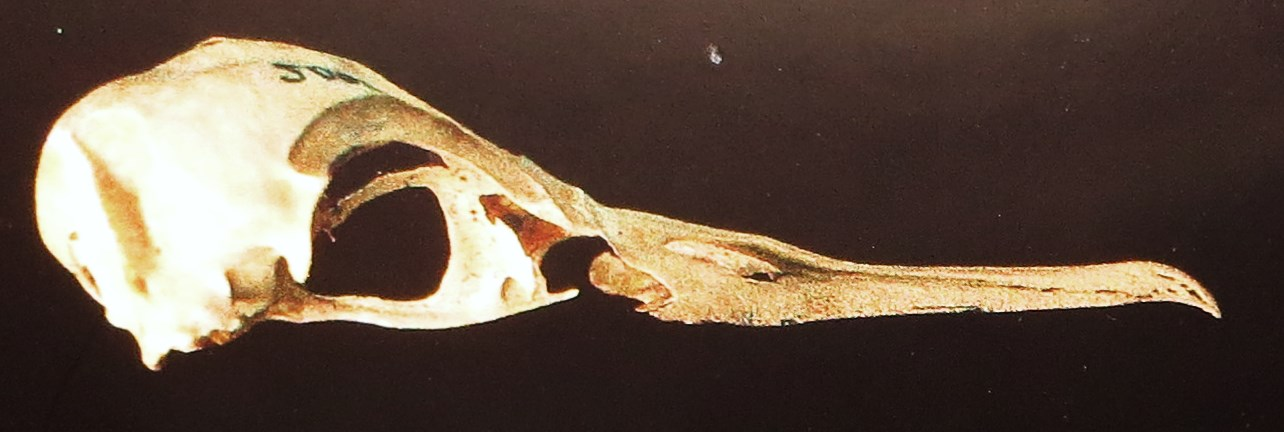
- Skull at the Museum of Nature and Man, Tenerife (Spain).

Conservation status
- Extinct

Scientific classification
- Kingdom: Animalia
- Phylum: Chordata
- Class: Aves
- Order: Procellariiformes
- Family: Procellariidae
- Genus: Puffinus
- Species: †P. olsoni

Binomial name
- †Puffinus olsoni McMinn, Jaume & Alcover, 1990

= Lava shearwater =

Lava shearwater Temporal range: Holocene

Extinct species of bird

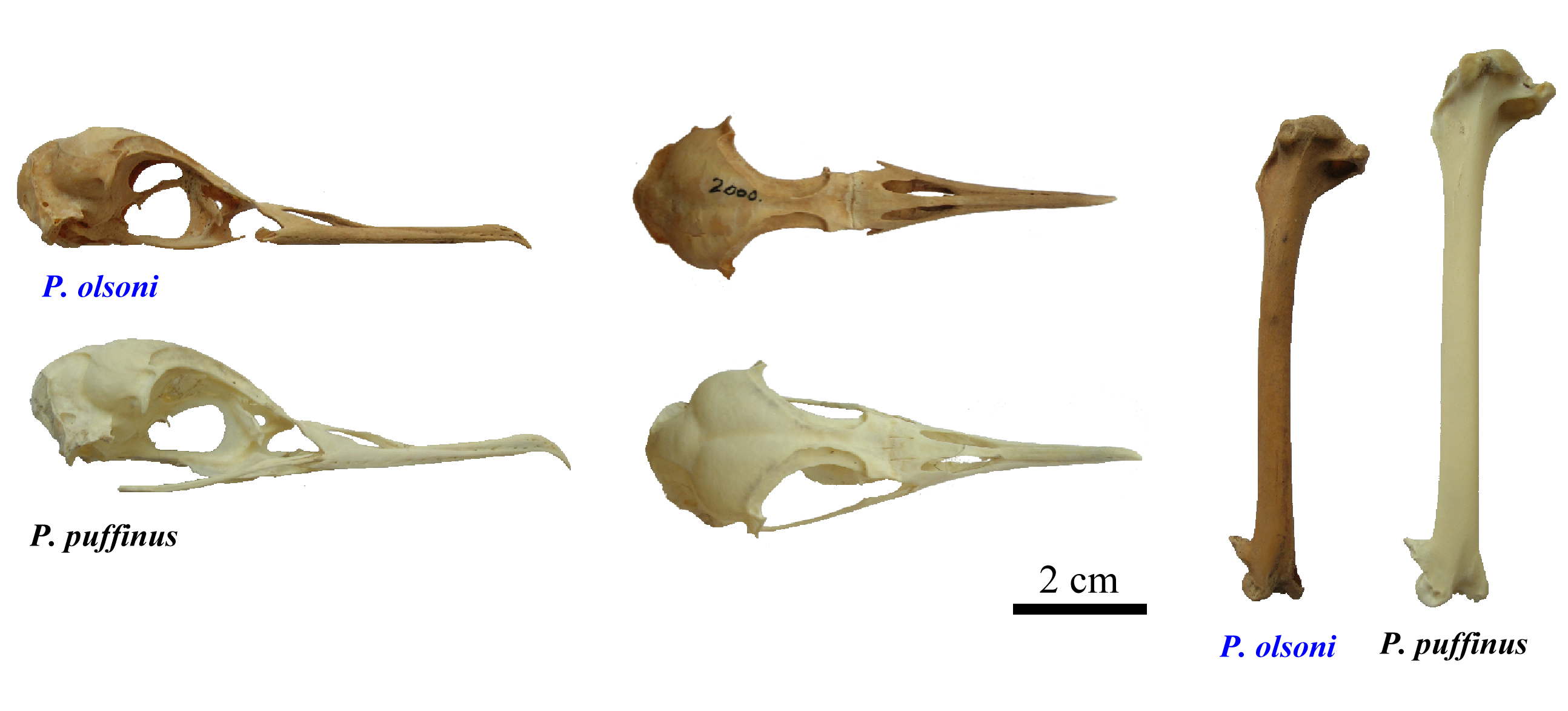
Left and middle: Skull of P. olsoni (above) compared to skull of P. puffinus Right: Humerus of P. olsoni (left) compared to humerus of P. puffinus (right)

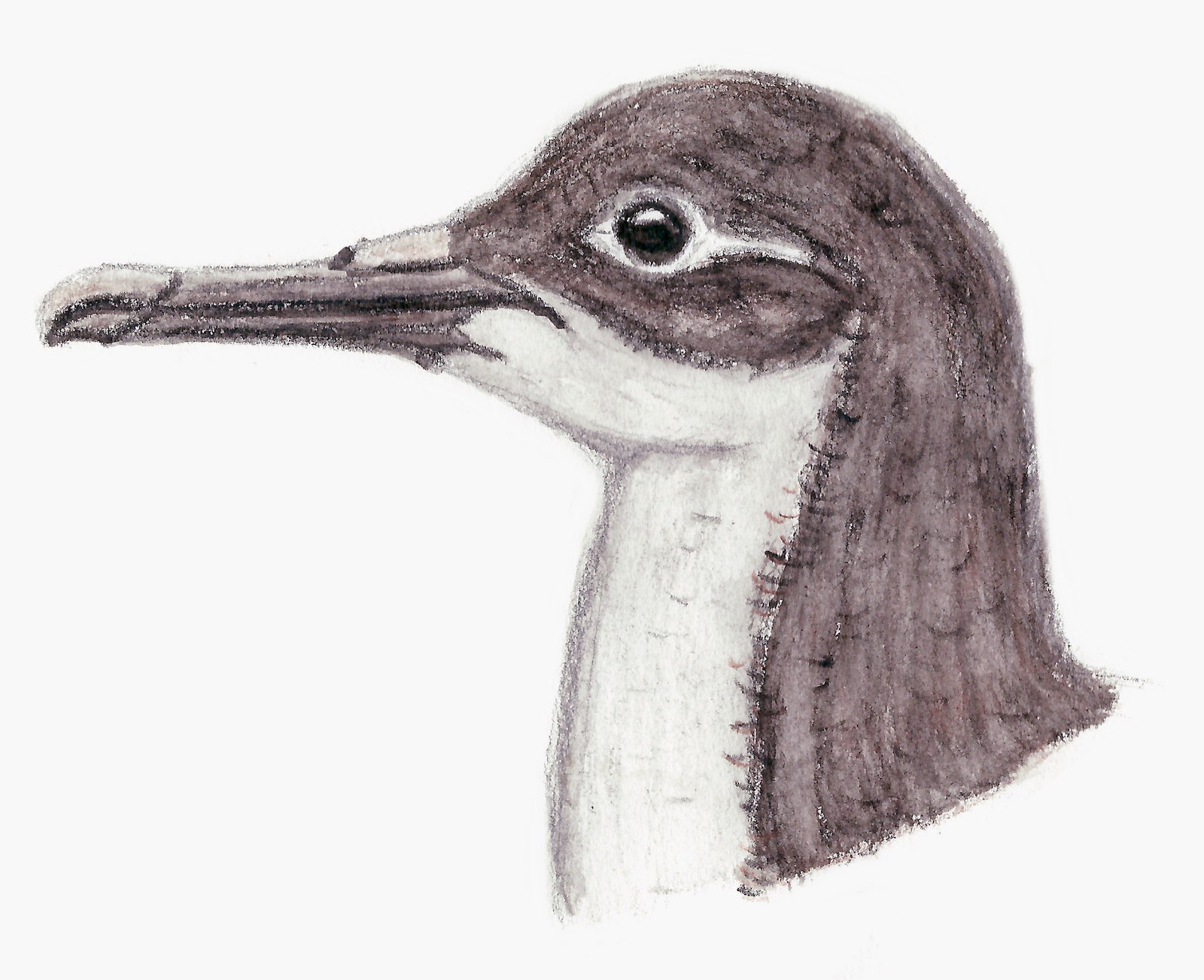
Hypothetical life restoration, based on known material and extant Puffinus shearwaters.

The lava shearwater (Puffinus olsoni), or Olson's shearwater, is an extinct species of shearwater that bred on Lanzarote and Fuerteventura in the Canary Islands. It is known from fossil remains, and was only described in 1990. It was intermediate in size between the Manx shearwater and the little shearwater. The remains of the species are particularly common in lava fields.

The species is thought to have survived the arrival of the first settlers in the Canary Islands, and become extinct after the arrival of European settlers in the 15th century. It is suspected that the species became extinct due to hunting pressures and possibly the arrival of introduced species such as rats.
