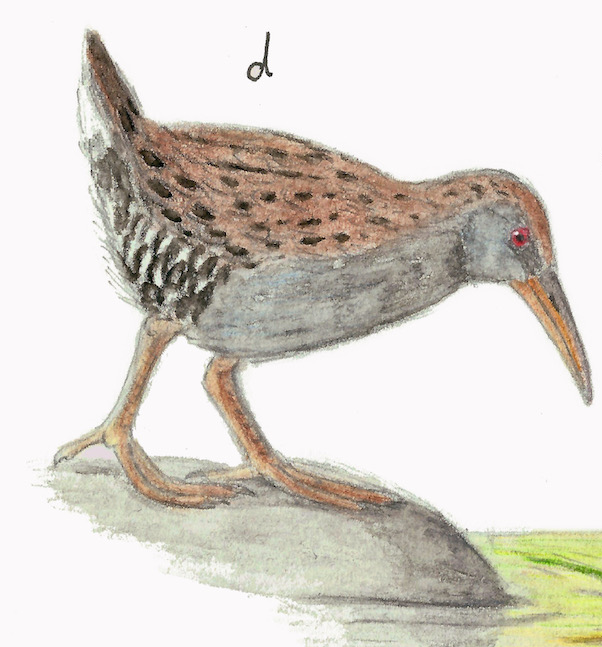
- Illustration of Rallus lowei as it may have looked.

Scientific classification
- Kingdom: Animalia
- Phylum: Chordata
- Class: Aves
- Order: Gruiformes
- Family: Rallidae
- Genus: Rallus
- Species: †R. lowei

Binomial name
- †Rallus lowei Alcover et al., 2015

= Madeira rail =

Madeira rail Temporal range: Holocene

Extinct species of bird

The Madeira rail (Rallus lowei) is an extinct species of Rallus that inhabited Madeira Island in Madeira during the Holocene epoch.
