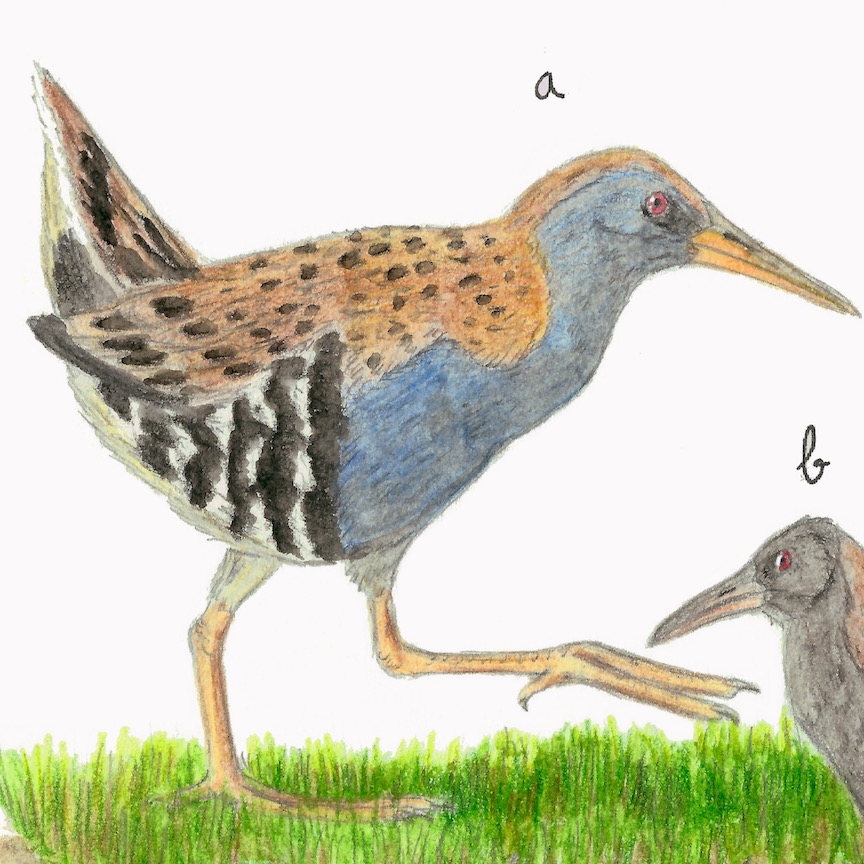
- Artist's illustration of Rallus montevargorum (marked with 'a') as it may have appeared while living.

Scientific classification
- Kingdom: Animalia
- Phylum: Chordata
- Class: Aves
- Order: Gruiformes
- Family: Rallidae
- Genus: Rallus
- Species: †R. montevagorum

Binomial name
- †Rallus montevagorum Alcover et al., 2015

= Pico rail =

Pico rail Temporal range: Holocene

Extinct species of bird

The Pico rail (Rallus montevagorum) is an extinct species of Rallus that inhabited Pico Island in the Azores during the Holocene epoch.
