= Balsas =

Balsas may refer to:

== Places ==
- Balsas, Maranhão, Brazil
- Balsas, Ecuador
  - Balsas Canton
- Balsas District, Chachapoyas Province, Peru
- Balsas, Guerrero, Mexico

== Rivers ==
- Balsas River, in Mexico
- Balsas River (Panama)
- Das Balsas River (disambiguation)

== Other uses ==
- Balsas (plant), a genus of the Sapindoideae flowering plants
- Balsa (ship), reed boats or ships of pre-Columbian South American civilizations

== See also ==
- Balsa (disambiguation)
- Balsas dry forests, in Mexico
