= Balsa (disambiguation) =

Balsa is the tree Ochroma pyramidale or the light-weight wood it produces.

Balsa may also refer to:

- Balsa (software), a free and open-source e-mail client for Linux
- Balsa (moth), a genus of moths in the family Noctuidae
- Balsa (Roman town), in present-day southern Portugal
- Balsa (ship), South American boat made of reeds
- Balsa, Brazil, headland near Manaus, Amazonas, Brazil
- Balsa, Hungary, village in Szabolcs-Szatmár-Bereg County, Hungary
- Balșa (Hungarian: Balsa), a commune in Hunedoara County, Romania
- Balsa, a fictional character in the anime and manga Moribito series
- Balša I (fl. 1362), ruler of the principality of Zeta in what is now southern Montenegro and northern Albania and founder of the Balšić noble family
- Balša II (died 1385), son and successor of Balša I
- Balša III (1387–1421), last ruler of Zeta in the Balšić noble family
- Walsa, Hispanicized spelling Balsa, a mountain in Peru

== See also ==
- "La balsa", 1967 song by Los Gatos
- La Balsa, 1970 single-raft expedition
- Las Balsas, 1973 multi-raft expedition
