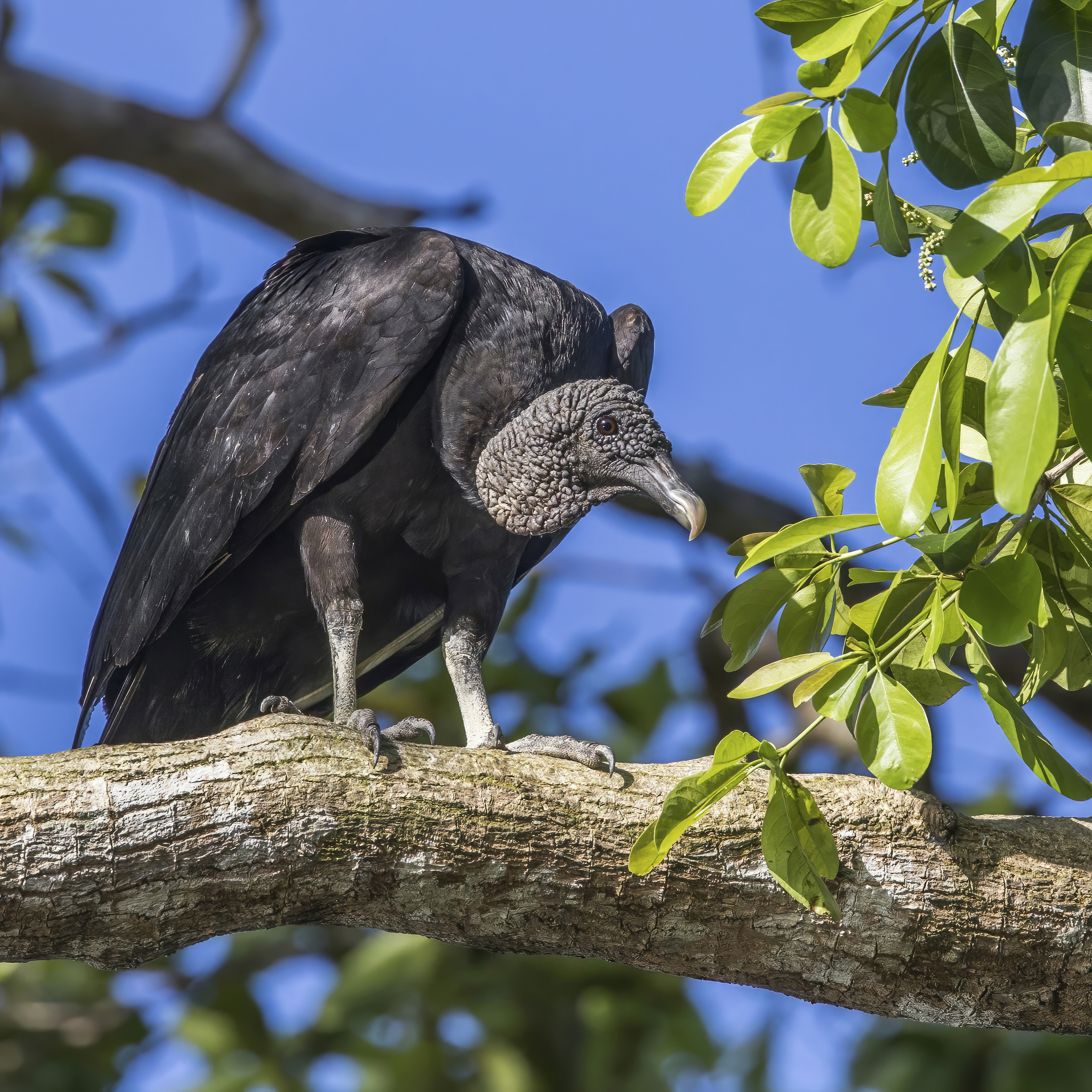
- C. a. brasiliensis Petén, Guatemala

Conservation status
- Least Concern (IUCN 3.1)

Scientific classification
- Kingdom: Animalia
- Phylum: Chordata
- Class: Aves
- Order: Cathartiformes
- Family: Cathartidae
- Genus: Coragyps
- Species: C. atratus

Binomial name
- Coragyps atratus (Bechstein, 1793)

Subspecies
- C. a. atratus Bechstein, 1793 North American black vulture; C. a. foetens Lichtenstein, 1817 Andean black vulture; C. a. brasiliensis Bonaparte, 1850 South American black vulture
- Range of the black vulture

Synonyms
- Vultur atratus Bechstein, 1793

= Black vulture =

New World vulture

The black vulture (Coragyps atratus), also known as the American black vulture, Mexican vulture, zopilote, urubu, or gallinazo, is a bird in the New World vulture family whose range extends from the northeastern United States to Peru, Central Chile and Uruguay in South America, and common throughout Brazil where it can be seen in large scavenging groups. Although a common and widespread species, it has a somewhat more restricted distribution than its compatriot, the turkey vulture, which breeds well into Canada and all the way south to Tierra del Fuego. It is the only extant member of the genus Coragyps, which is in the family Cathartidae. Despite the similar name and appearance, this species is not closely related to the Eurasian black vulture, an Old World vulture, of the family Accipitridae (which includes raptors like the eagles, hawks, kites, and harriers). For ease of locating animal corpses (their primary source of sustenance), black vultures tend to inhabit relatively open areas with scattered trees, such as chaparral, in addition to subtropical forested areas and parts of the Brazilian pantanal.

With a wingspan of 1.5 m (4.9 ft), the black vulture is an imposing bird, though relatively small for a vulture, let alone a raptor. It has black plumage, a featherless, grayish-black head and neck, and a short, hooked beak. These features are all evolutionary adaptations to life as a scavenger; their black plumage stays visibly cleaner than that of a lighter-colored bird, the bare head is adapted for easily digging inside animal carcasses, and the hooked beak is built for stripping the bodies clean of meat. The absence of head feathers helps the birds stay clean and remain (more or less) free of animal blood and bodily fluids, which could become problematic for the vultures and attract parasites; most vultures are known to bathe after eating, provided there is a water source. This water source can be natural or man-made, such as a stream or a livestock water tank.

The black vulture is a scavenger and feeds on carrion, but will also eat eggs, small reptiles, or small newborn animals (livestock such as cattle, or deer, rodents, rabbits, etc.), albeit very rarely. They will also opportunistically prey on extremely weakened, sick, elderly, or otherwise vulnerable animals. In areas populated by humans, it also scavenges at waste disposal sites, such as garbage dumps. It finds its meals by using its keen eyesight or following other vultures, especially those of the Cathartes genus which possess a keen sense of smell. Lacking a syrinx—the vocal organ of birds—its only vocalizations are grunts or low hisses. It lays its eggs in caves, in cliffside rock crevasses, dead and hollow trees, or, in the absence of predators, on the bare ground, generally raising two chicks each year. The parents feed their young by regurgitation of crop milk. In the United States, the vulture receives legal protection under the Migratory Bird Treaty Act of 1918. This vulture also appeared in Mayan codices.

== Taxonomy ==
The American naturalist William Bartram wrote of the black vulture in his 1791 book Bartram's Travels, calling it Vultur atratus "black vulture" or "carrion crow". Bartram's work has been rejected for nomenclatoríal purposes by the International Commission on Zoological Nomenclature as the author did not consistently use the system of binomial nomenclature. The German ornithologist Johann Matthäus Bechstein formally described the species using the same name in 1793 in his translation of John Latham's A General Synopsis of Birds. The common name "vulture" is derived from the Latin word vulturus, which means "tearer" and is a reference to its feeding habits. The species name, ātrātus, means "clothed in black", from the Latin āter 'dull black'.

Black vulture pair feeding on a mule deer head. Plate 106 from The Birds of America by J. J. Audubon.

Vieillot defined the genus Catharista in 1816, listing as its type C. urubu. French naturalist Emmanuel Le Maout placed in its current genus Coragyps (as C. urubu) in 1853. Isidore Geoffroy Saint-Hilaire has been listed as the author in the past, but he did not publish any official description. The genus name means "raven-vulture", from a contraction of the Greek corax/κόραξ and gyps/γὺψ for the respective birds.

The American Ornithologists' Union used the name Catharista atrata initially before adopting Vieillot's name (Catharista urubu) in their third edition. By their fourth edition, they had adopted the current name.

The black vulture is basal (the earliest offshoot) to a lineage that gave rise to the turkey vulture and greater and lesser yellow-headed vultures, diverging around 12 million years ago.

Martin Lichtenstein described C. a. foetens, the Andean black vulture, in 1817, and Charles Lucien Bonaparte described C. a. brasiliensis, from Central and South America, in 1850 on the basis of smaller size and minor plumage differences. However, it has been established that the change between the three subspecies is clinal (that is, there is no division between the subspecies), and hence they are no longer recognised.

"Black vulture" has been designated the official name by the International Ornithologists' Union (IOC). "American black vulture" is also commonly used, and in 2007 the South American Classification Committee (SACC) of the American Ornithological Society unsuccessfully proposed it to be the official name of the species.

=== Evolutionary history of Coragyps ===
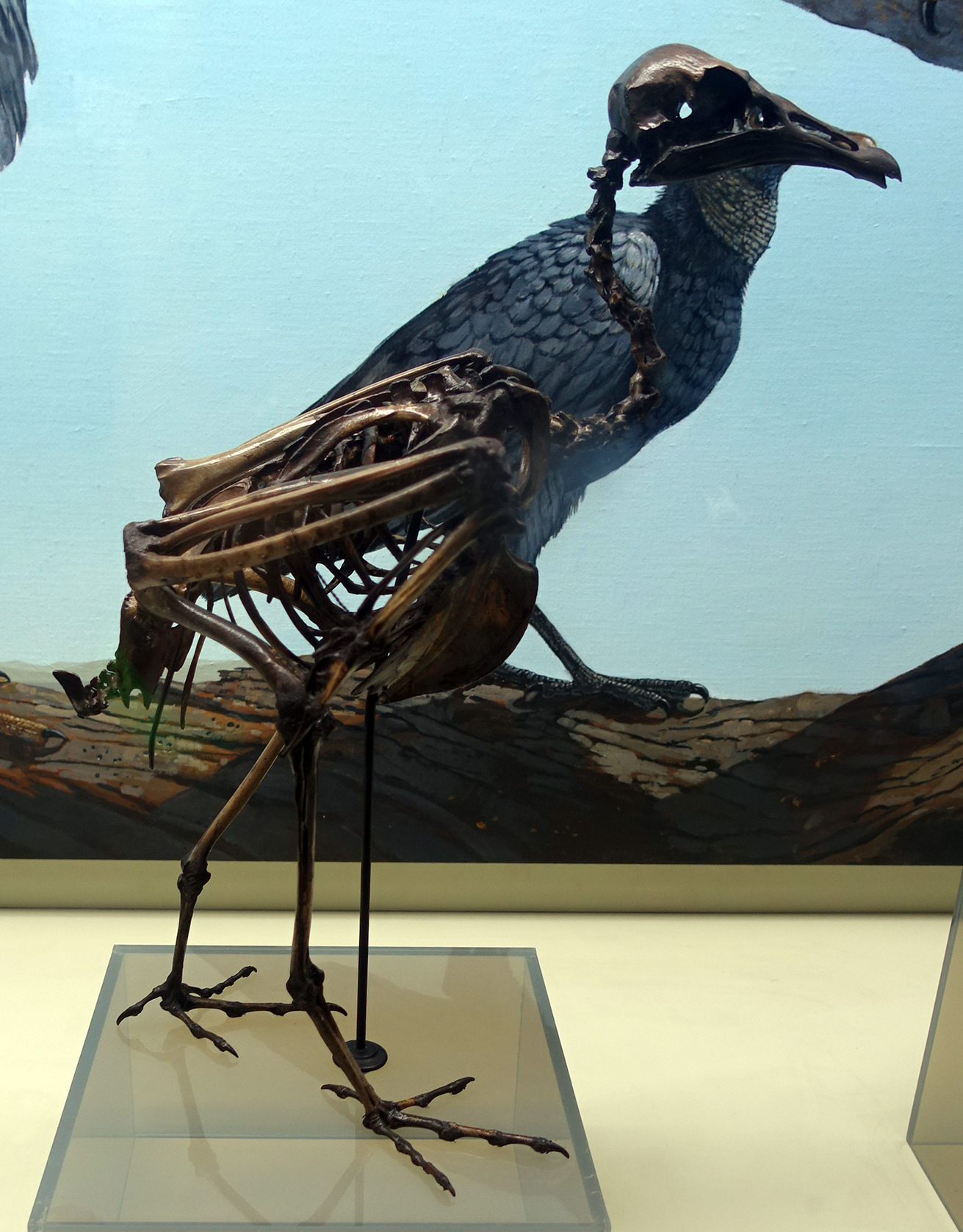
C. occidentalis fossil

From the Early to the Late Pleistocene, a prehistoric species of black vulture, C. occidentalis, known as the Pleistocene black vulture or—somewhat in error—the "western black vulture", occurred across the present species' range. This bird did not differ much from the black vulture of today except in size; it was some 10–15% larger and had a relatively flatter and wider bill. It filled a similar ecological niche as the living form but fed on larger animals, and was previously thought to have evolved into it by decreasing in size during the last ice age. However, a 2022 genetic study found C. occidentalis to be nested within the South American clade of black vultures; C. occidentalis had evolved from the modern black vulture about 400,000 years ago and developed a larger and more robust body size when it colonized high-altitude environments. C. occidentalis may have interacted with humans; a subfossil bone of the extinct species was found in a Paleo-Indian to Early Archaic (9000–8000 years BCE) midden at Five Mile Rapids near The Dalles, Oregon.

Fossil (or subfossil) black vultures cannot necessarily be attributed to the Pleistocene or the recent species without further information: the same size variation found in the living bird was also present in its larger prehistoric relative. Thus, in 1968, Hildegarde Howard separated the Mexican birds as C. occidentalis mexicanus as opposed to the birds from locations farther north (such as Rancho La Brea), which constituted the nominate subspecies C. o. occidentalis. The southern birds were of the same size as present-day northern black vultures and can only be distinguished by their somewhat stouter tarsometatarsus and the flatter and wider bills, and even then only with any certainty if the location where the fossils were found is known. As the Pleistocene and current black vultures form an evolutionary continuum rather than splitting into two or more lineages, some include the Pleistocene taxa in C. atratus, which is further affirmed by phylogenetic studies indicating that it forms a clade within the South American C. atratus.

An additional fossil species from the Late Pleistocene of Cuba, C. seductus, was described in 2020.

== Distribution and habitat ==
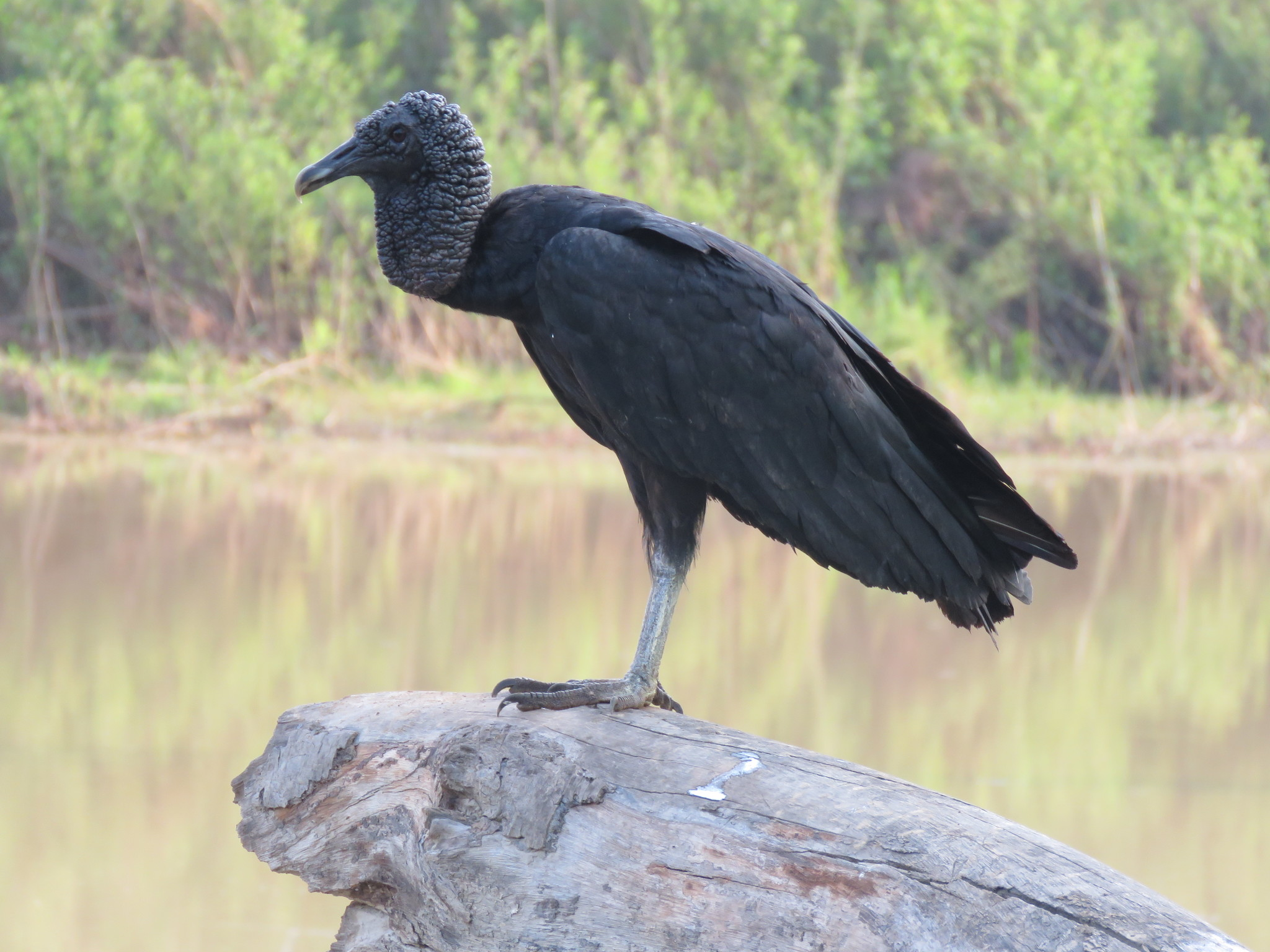
In Bolivia

The black vulture has a Nearctic and Neotropic distribution. Its range includes the mid-Atlantic States, the southernmost regions of the Midwestern United States, the southern United States, Mexico, Central America, and most of South America. In the 21st century, the black vulture's range has expanded northward farther into the Midwest and northeastern United States. It is usually a permanent resident throughout its range, although birds at the extreme north of its range may migrate short distances and others across their range may undergo local movements in unfavourable conditions. In South America, its range stretches to Peru, central Chile, Uruguay and Brazil. It also is found as a vagrant on the islands of the Caribbean.

It prefers open land interspersed with areas of woods or brush. It is also found in moist lowland forests, shrublands and grasslands, wetlands and swamps, pastures, and heavily degraded former forests. It is usually seen soaring or perched on fence posts or dead trees.

== Description ==
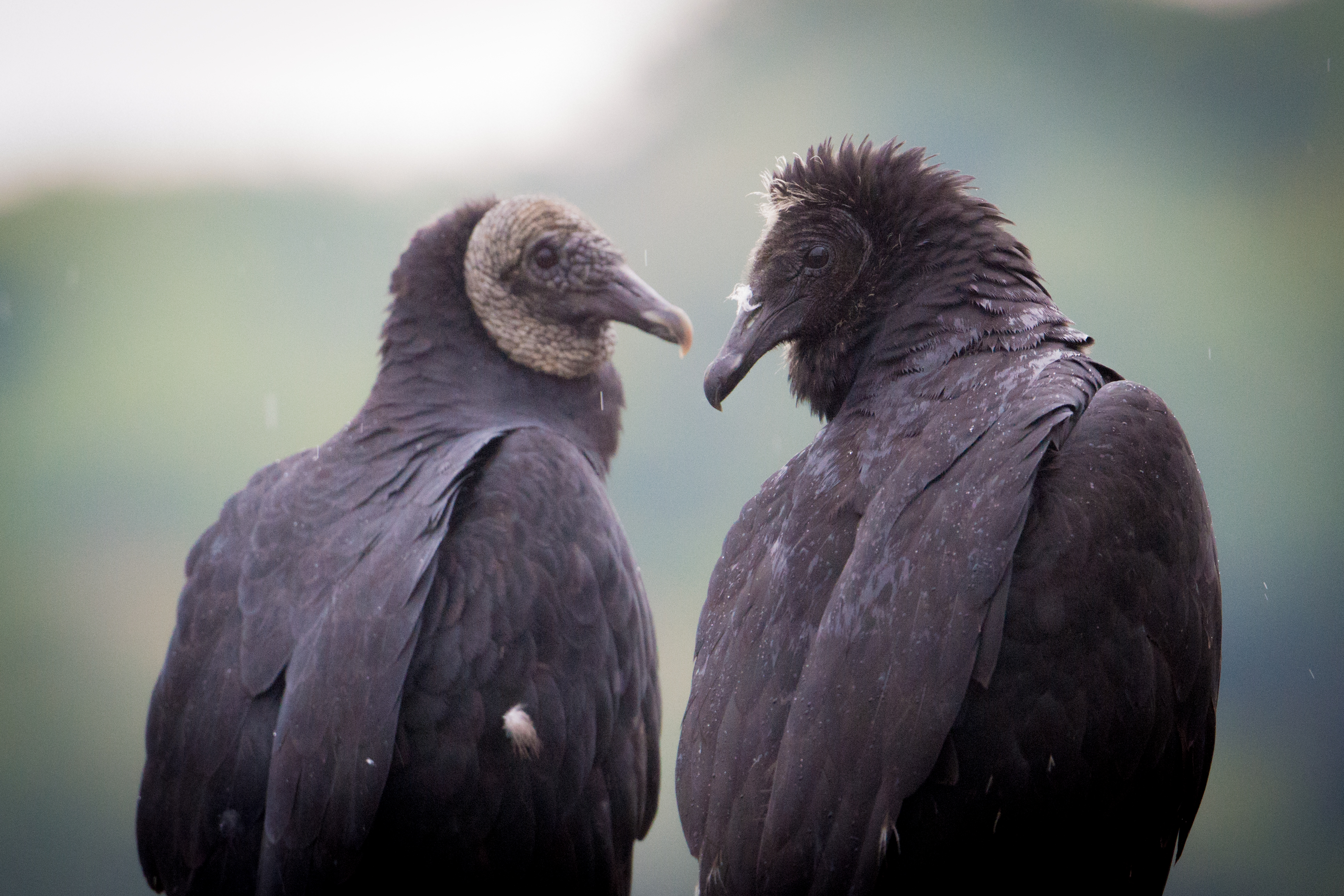
Adult and juvenile, Hueston Woods State Park, Ohio

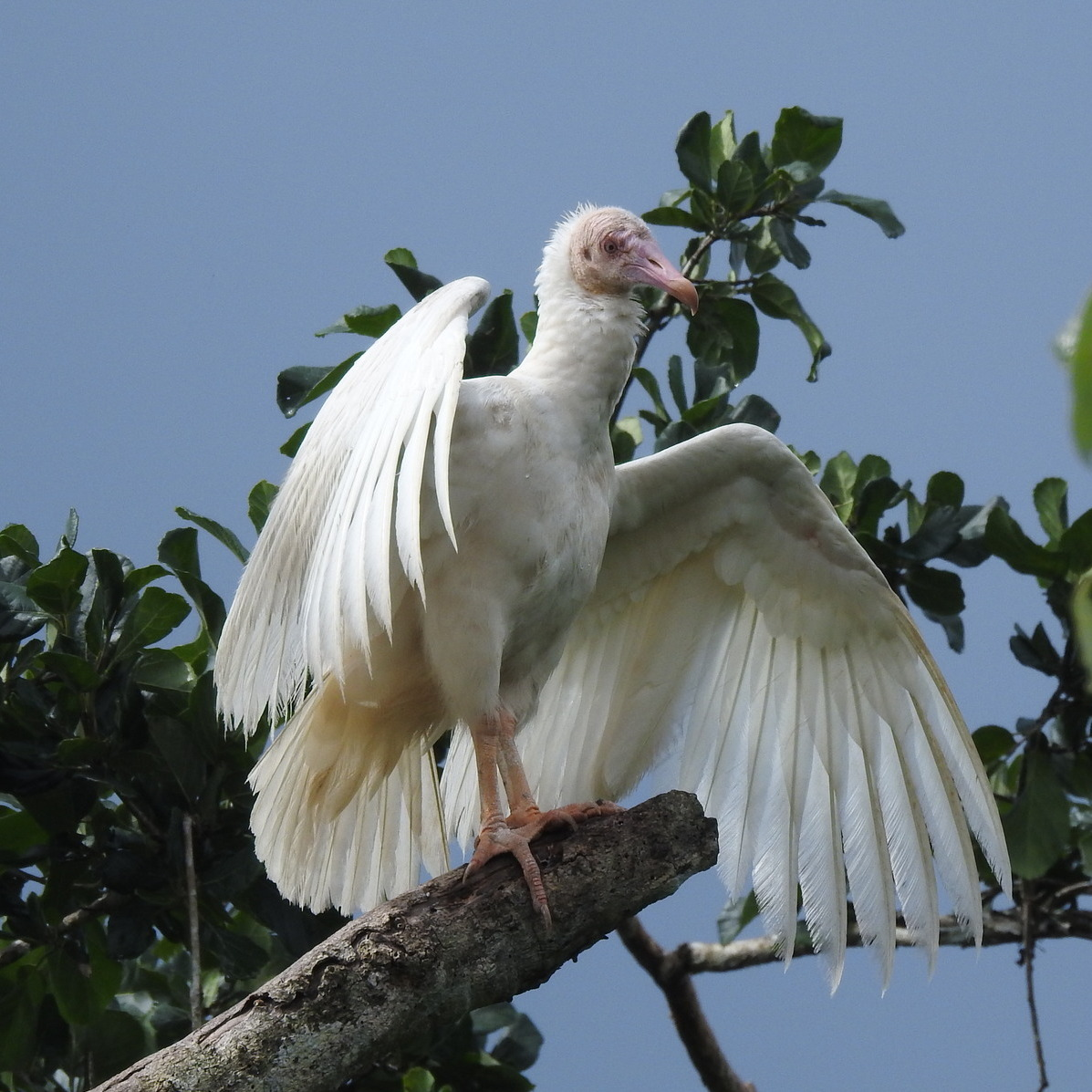
Albino black vulture in Mexico

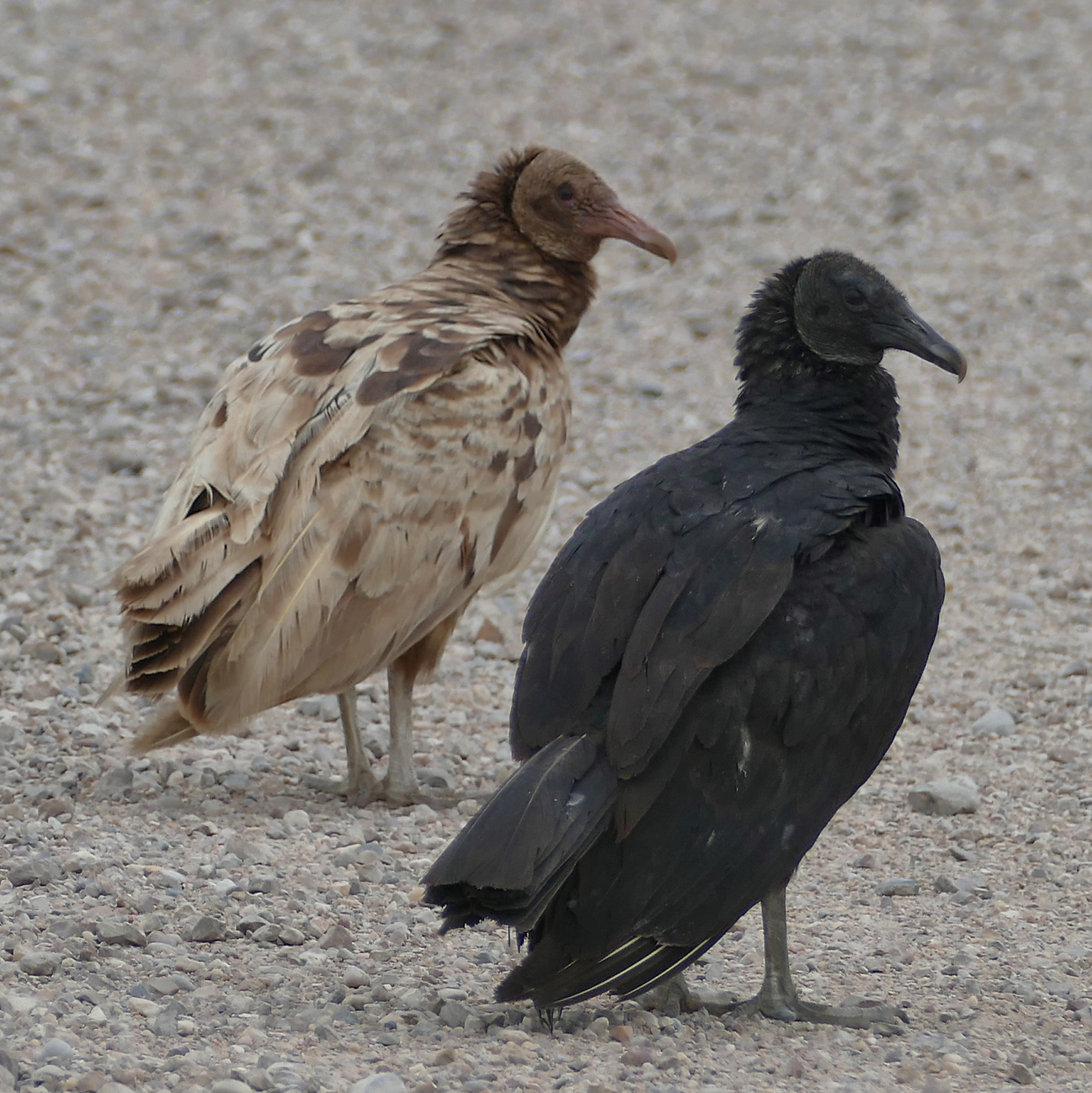
Leucistic and typical black vulture, in Texas

The black vulture is a fairly large scavenger, measuring 56–74 cm (22–29 in) in length, with a 1.33–1.67 m (52–66 in) wingspan. Weight for black vultures from North America and the Andes ranges from 1.6 to 3 kg (3.5 to 6.6 lb) but in the smaller vultures of the tropical lowlands it is 1.18–1.94 kg (2.6–4.3 lb). Fifty vultures in Texas were found to average 2.15 kg (4.7 lb) while 119 birds in Venezuela were found to average 1.64 kg (3.6 lb). The extended wing bone measures 38.6–45 cm (15.2–17.7 in), the shortish tail measures 16–21 cm (6.3–8.3 in) and the relatively long tarsus measures 7–8.5 cm (2.8–3.3 in).

Its plumage is mainly glossy black. The head and neck are featherless, and the skin is dark gray and wrinkled. The iris of the eye is brown and has a single incomplete row of eyelashes on the upper lid and two rows on the lower lid. The legs are grayish-white, while the two front toes of the foot are long and have small webs at their bases.

The nostrils are not divided by a septum, but rather are perforate; one can see through the beak from the side. The wings are broad but relatively short. The bases of the primary feathers are white, producing a white patch on the underside of the wing's edge, which is visible in flight. The tail is short and square, barely reaching past the edge of the folded wings.

A leucistic C. atratus brasiliensis was observed in Piñas, Ecuador, in 2005. It had white plumage overall, with only the tarsus and tail and some black undertail feathers. It was not an albino as its skin seemed to have a normal, dark color, and it was part of a flock of some twenty normally plumaged individuals.

== Ecology and behavior ==
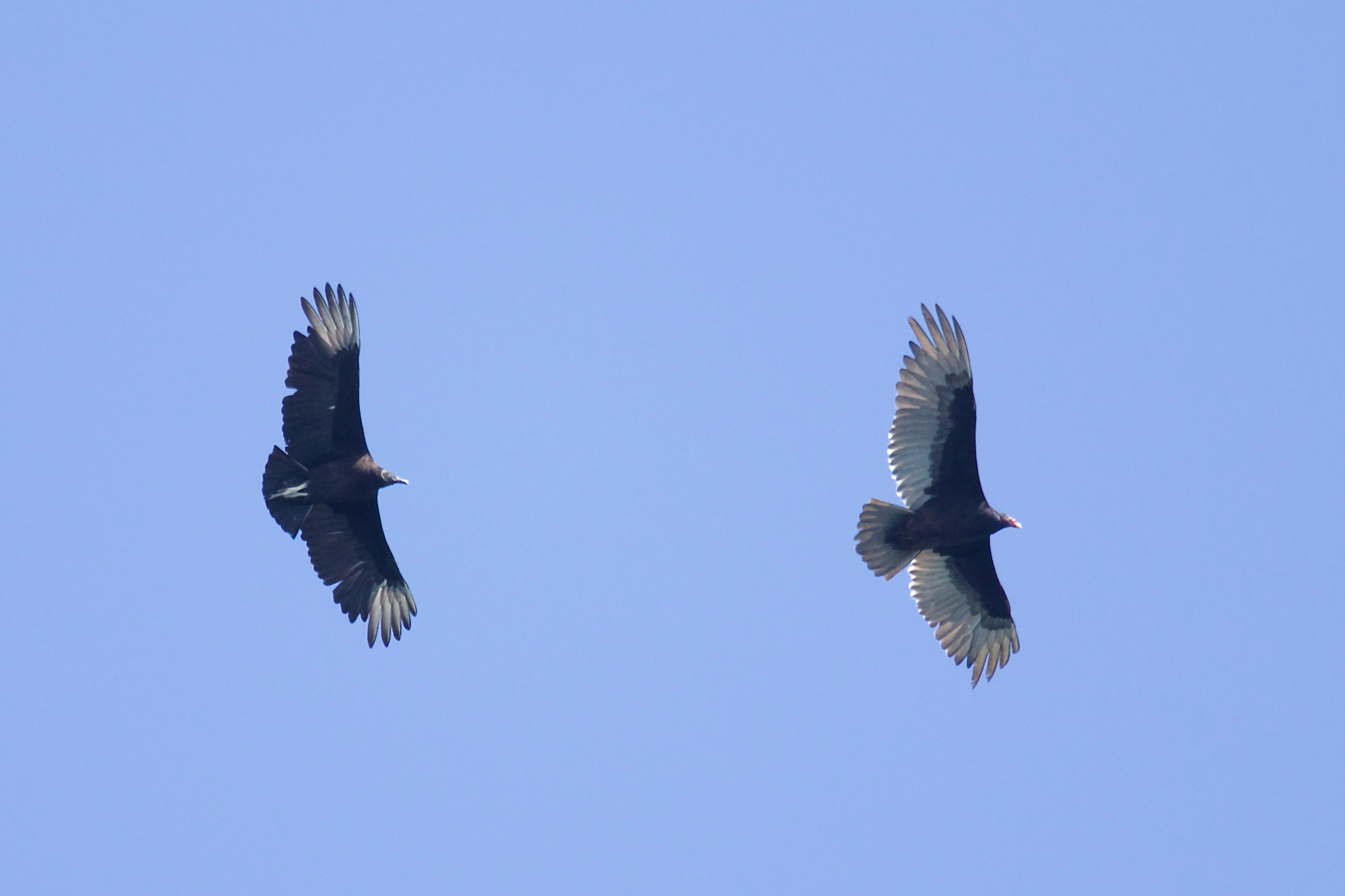
Black vulture (left) compared to a turkey vulture (right) in flight, in Toronto

The black vulture soars high while searching for food, holding its wings horizontally when gliding. It flaps in short bursts, followed by short periods of gliding. Its flight is less efficient than that of other vultures, as the wings are not as long, forming a smaller wing area. In comparison with the turkey vulture, the black vulture flaps its wings more frequently during flight. It is known to regurgitate when approached or disturbed, which assists in predator deterrence and taking flight by decreasing its takeoff weight. Like all New World vultures, the black vulture often defecates on its legs, using the evaporation of the water in the feces and/or urine to cool itself, a process known as urohidrosis. It cools the blood vessels in the unfeathered tarsi and feet, and causes white uric acid to streak the legs. Because it lacks a syrinx, like other New World vultures, it has very few vocalization capabilities. It is generally silent, but can make hisses and grunts when agitated or while feeding. The black vulture is gregarious and roosts in large groups. In areas where their ranges overlap, the black vulture will roost on the bare branches of dead trees alongside groups of turkey vultures. The black vulture generally forages in groups; a flock of black vultures can easily drive a rival turkey vulture, which is generally solitary while foraging, from a carcass.

Like the turkey vulture, this vulture is often seen standing in a spread-winged stance. This is believed to serve multiple functions: drying the wings, warming the body, and baking off bacteria. This same behavior is displayed by other New World vultures, Old World vultures, and storks.

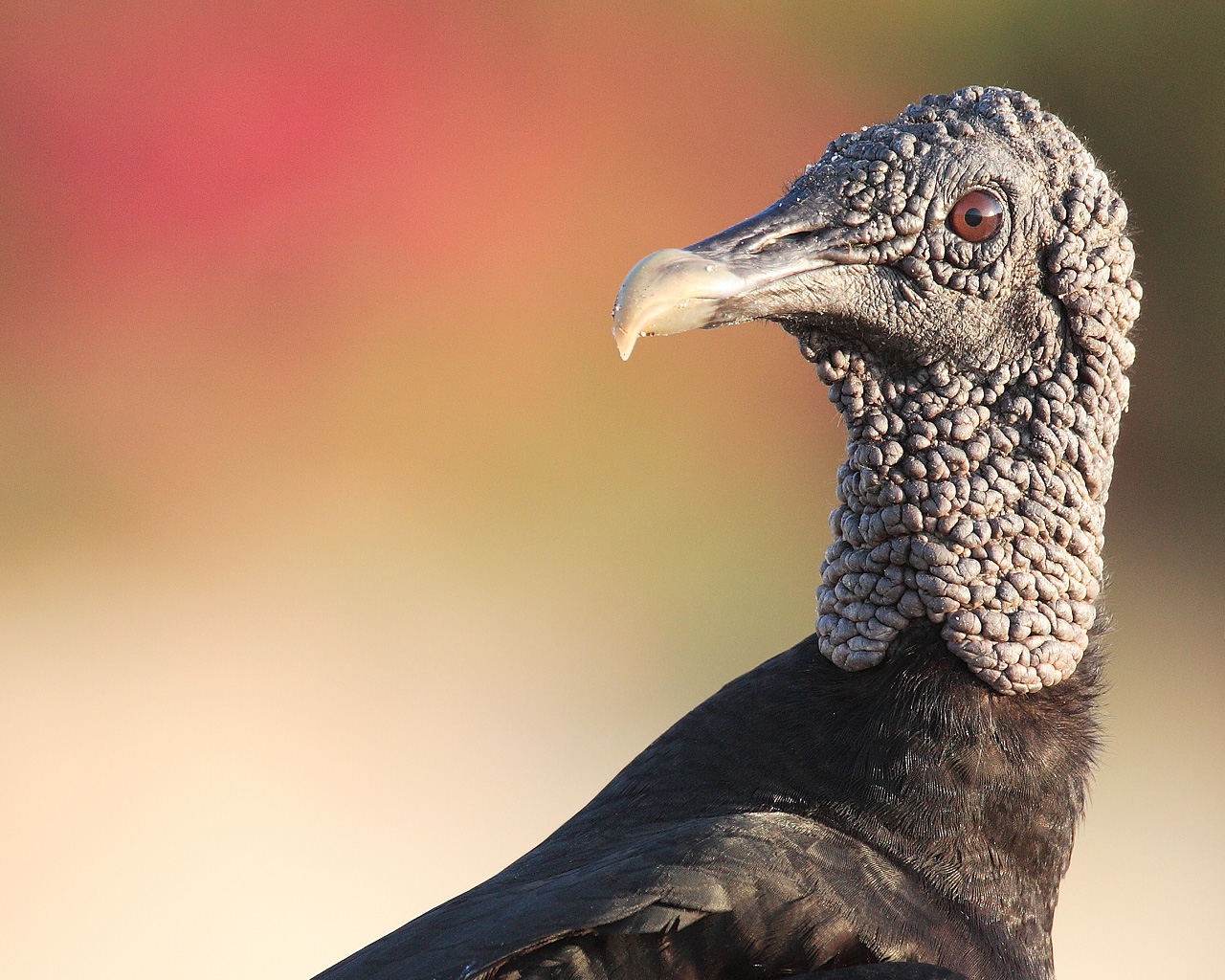
C. a. brasiliensis, in Panama

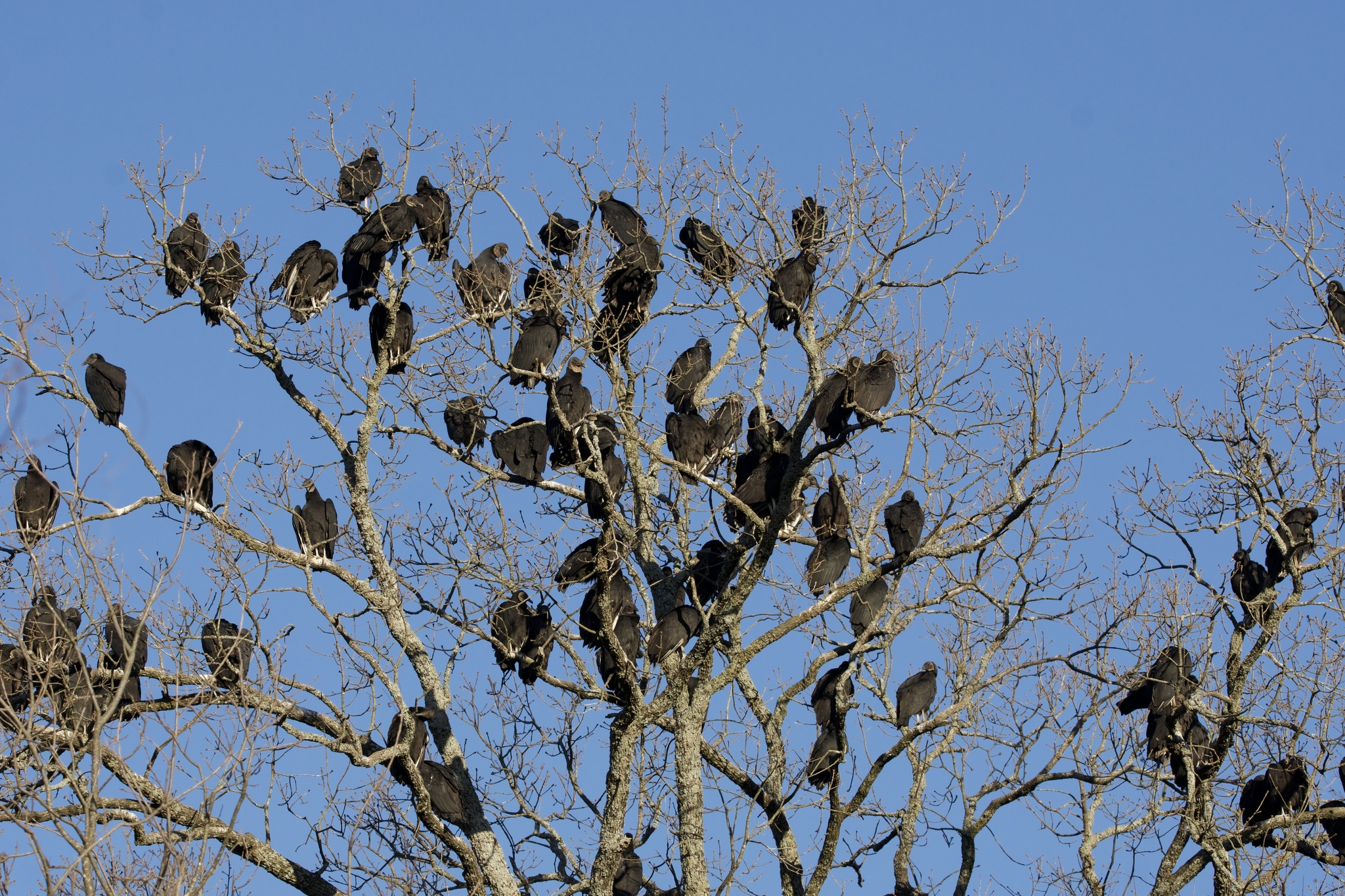
A flock in Arkansas

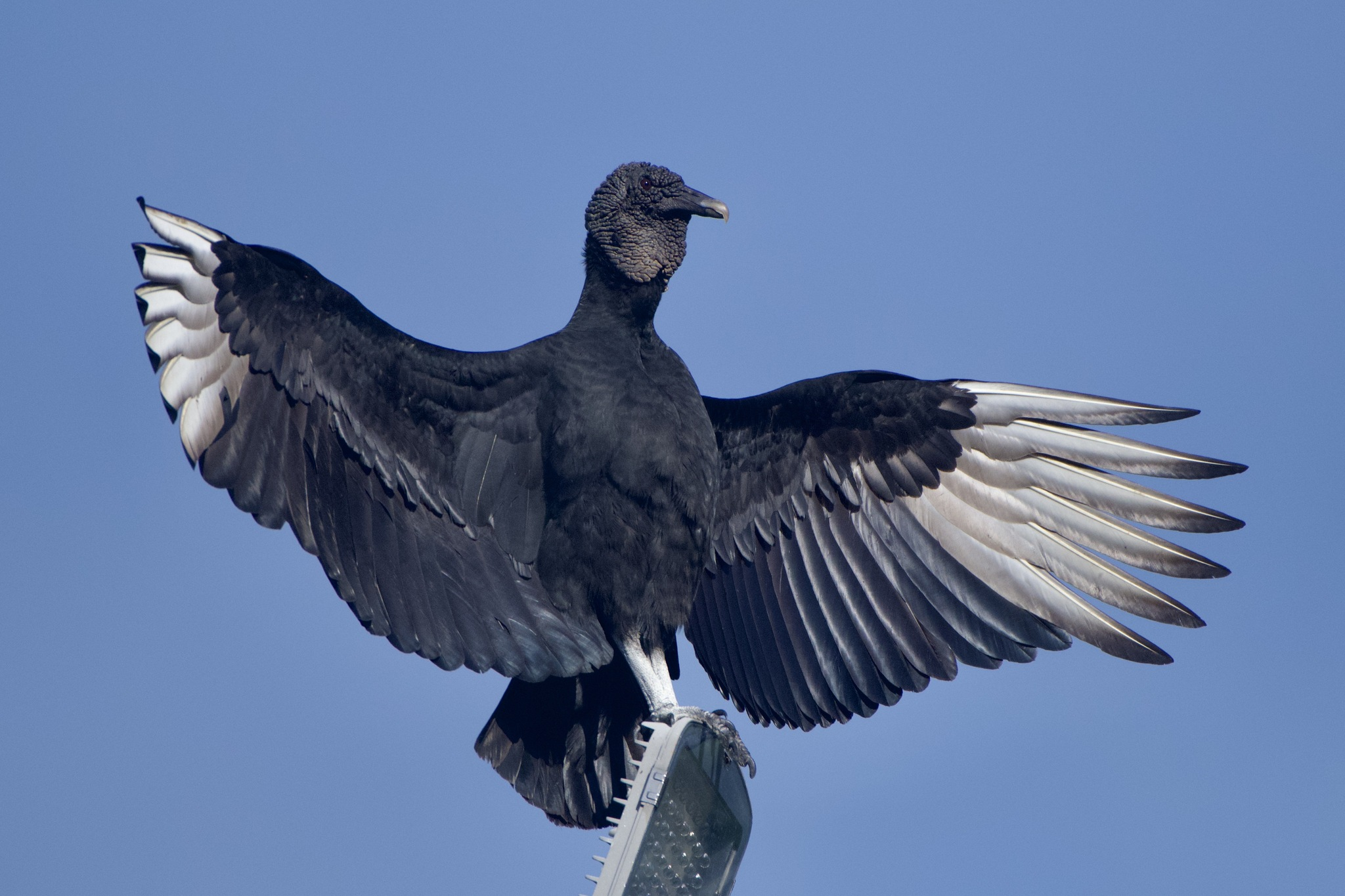
Sunbathing, in Panama

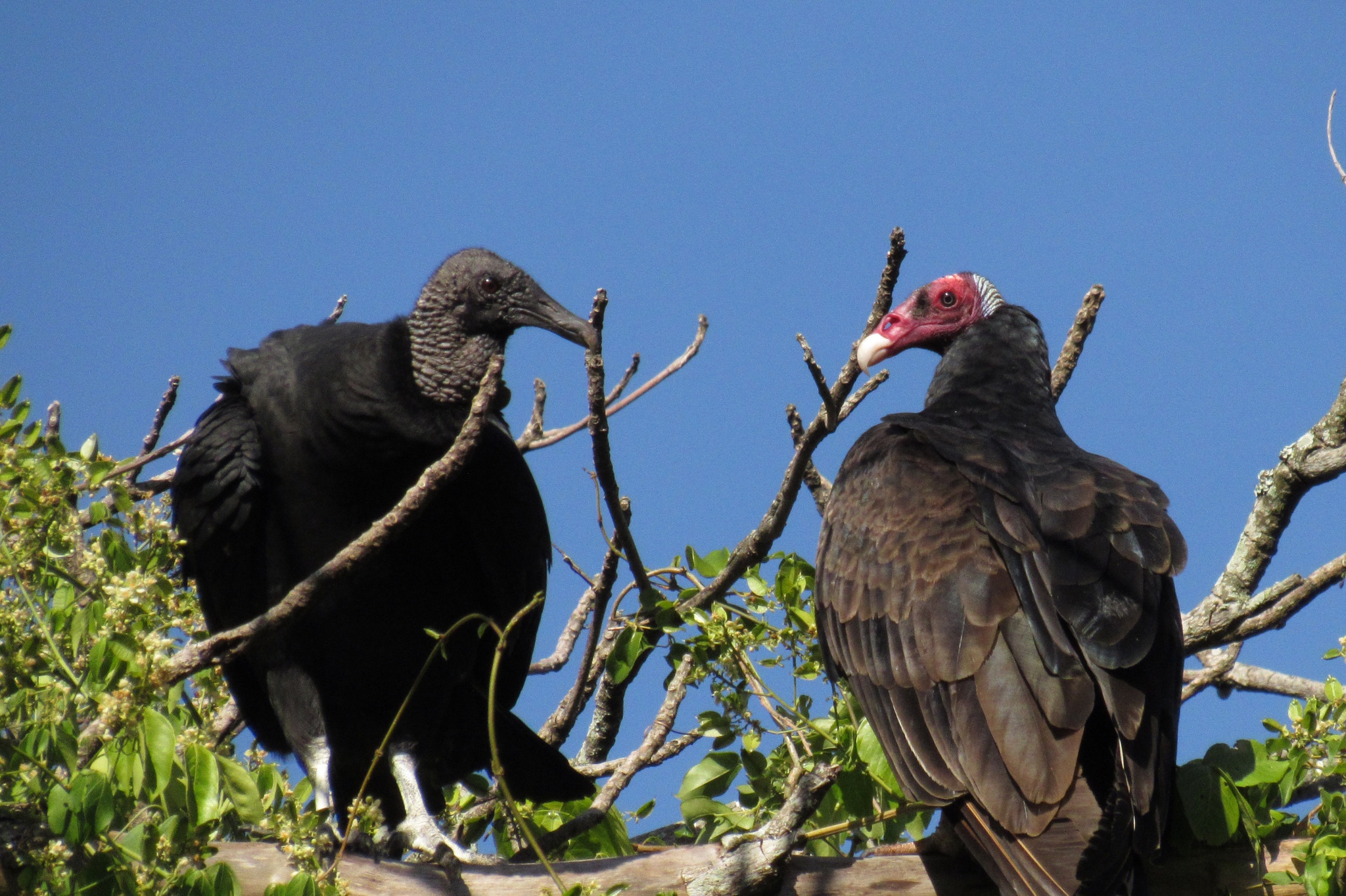
Black vulture (left) compared to a turkey vulture (right), in Brazil

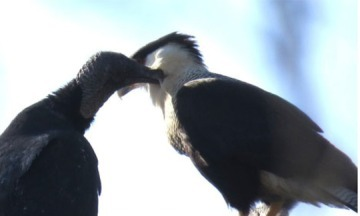
Black vulture preening a crested caracara, in Texas

There are several recorded instances of black vultures approaching and preening crested caracaras. In all cases, the unusual behaviour begins with the caracara bowing its head down, in an apparent invitation to preen.

=== Breeding ===
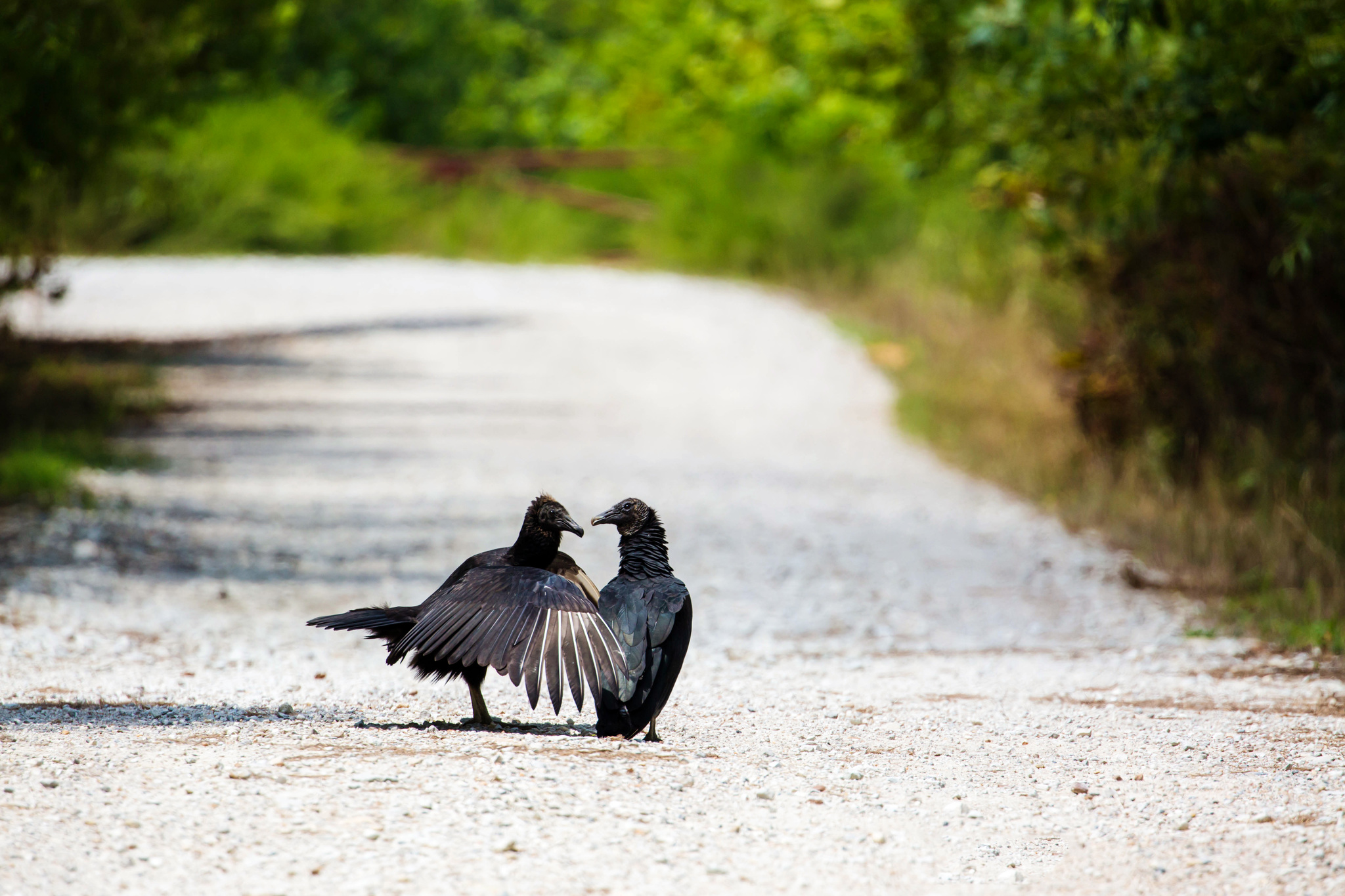
Courtship

The timing of black vultures' breeding season varies with the latitude at which they live. In the United States, birds in Florida begin breeding as early as January, while those in Ohio generally do not start before March. In South America, Argentinian and Chilean birds begin egg-laying as early as September, while those further north on the continent typically wait until October. Some in South America breed even later than that—black vultures in Trinidad typically do not start until November, for example, and those in Ecuador may wait until February. Pairs are formed following a courtship ritual which is performed on the ground: several males circle a female with their wings partially open as they strut and bob their heads. They sometimes perform courtship flights, diving or chasing each other over their chosen nest site.

The black vulture lays its eggs on the ground in a wooded area, a hollow log, or some other cavity, seldom more than 3 m (10 ft) above the ground. While it generally does not use any nesting materials, it may decorate the area around the nest with bits of brightly colored plastic, shards of glass, or metal items such as bottle caps. Clutch size is generally two eggs, though this can vary from one to three. The egg is oval and, on average, measures 7.56 cm × 5.09 cm (2.98 in × 2.00 in). The smooth, gray-green, bluish, or white shell is variably blotched or spotted with lavender or pale brown around the larger end. Both parents incubate the eggs, which hatch after 28 to 41 days. Upon hatching, the young are covered with a buffy down, unlike turkey vulture chicks which are white. Both parents feed the nestlings, regurgitating food at the nest site. The young remain in the nest for two months, and after 75 to 80 days, they can fly skillfully. Predation of black vultures is relatively unlikely, though eggs and nestlings are readily eaten if found by mammalian predators such as raccoons, coatis and foxes. Due to its aggressiveness and size, few predators can threaten the fully-grown vulture. However, various eagles may kill vultures in conflicts, and even the ornate hawk-eagle, a slightly smaller bird than the vulture, has preyed on adult black vultures, as well as the two eagles native to North America (north of Mexico).

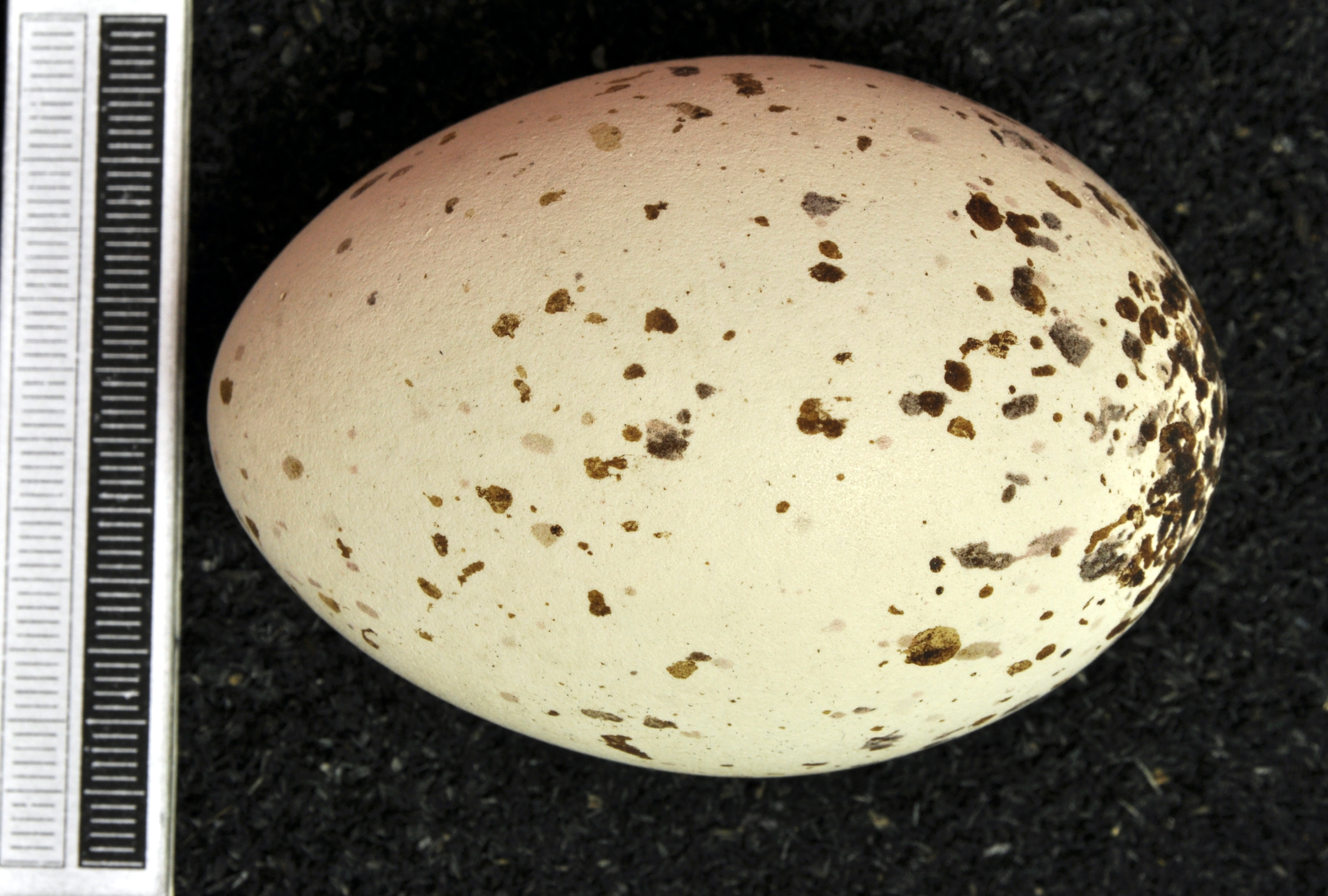
Egg, Collection Museum Wiesbaden

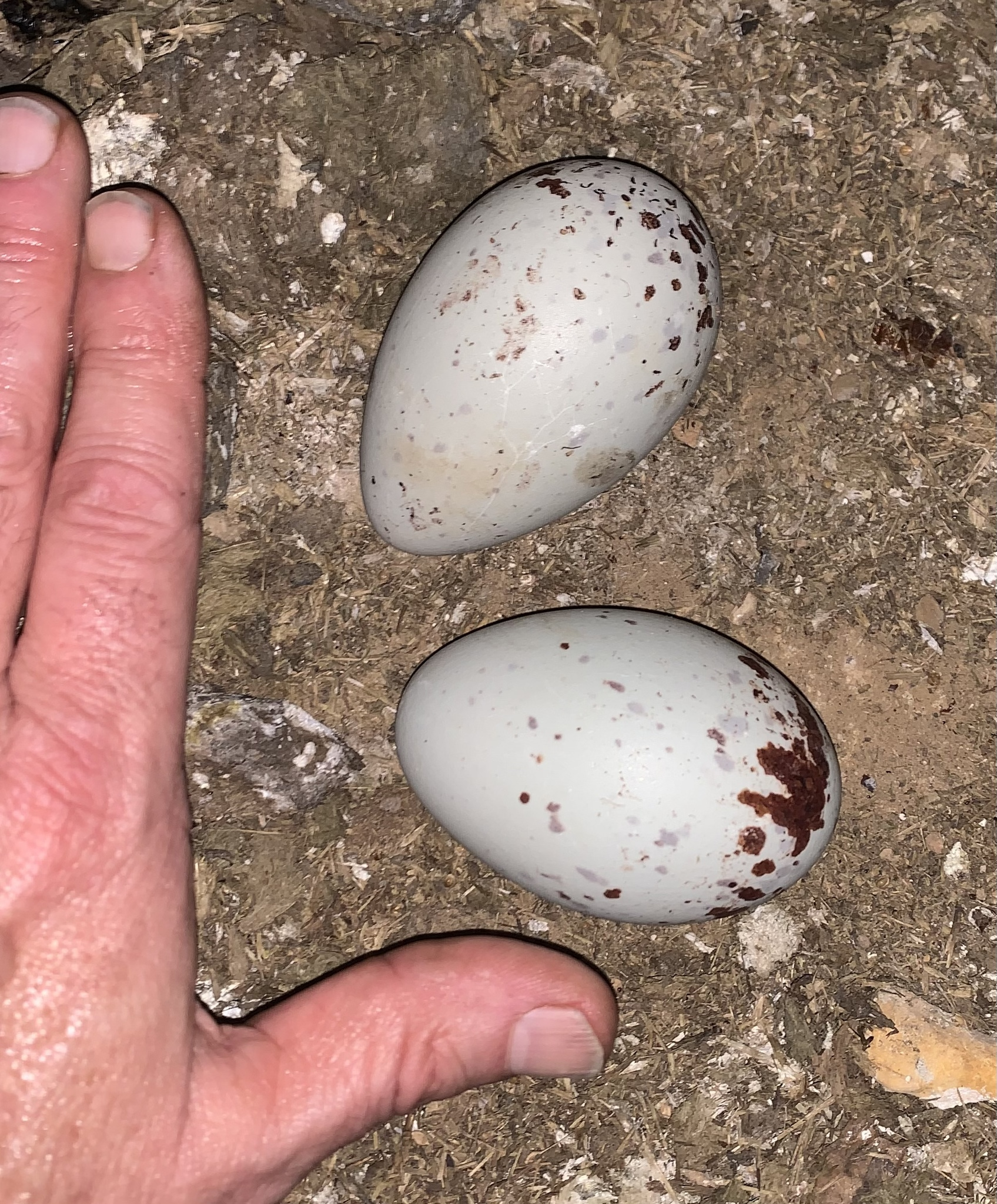
Eggs, showing size

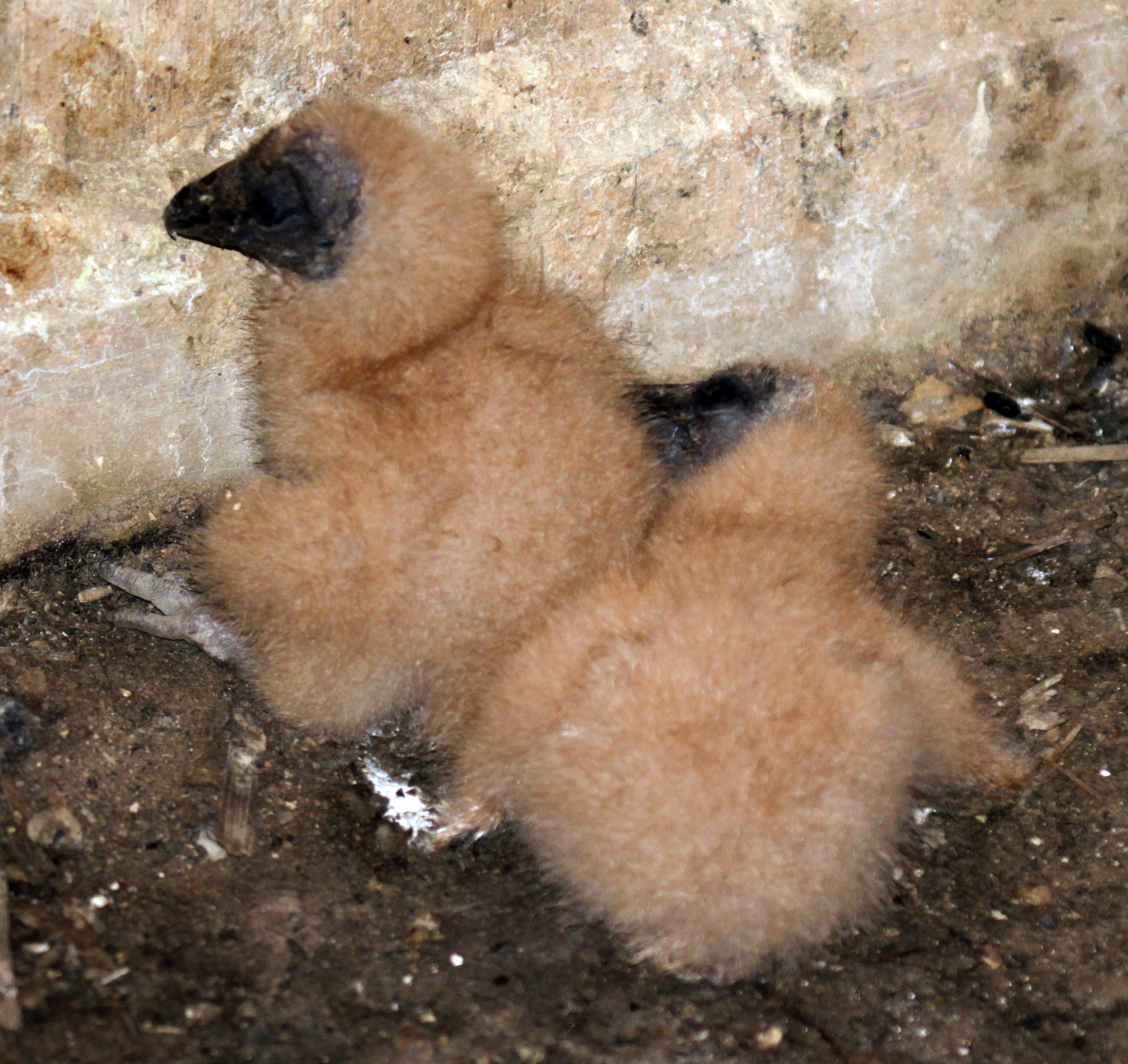
Hatchlings

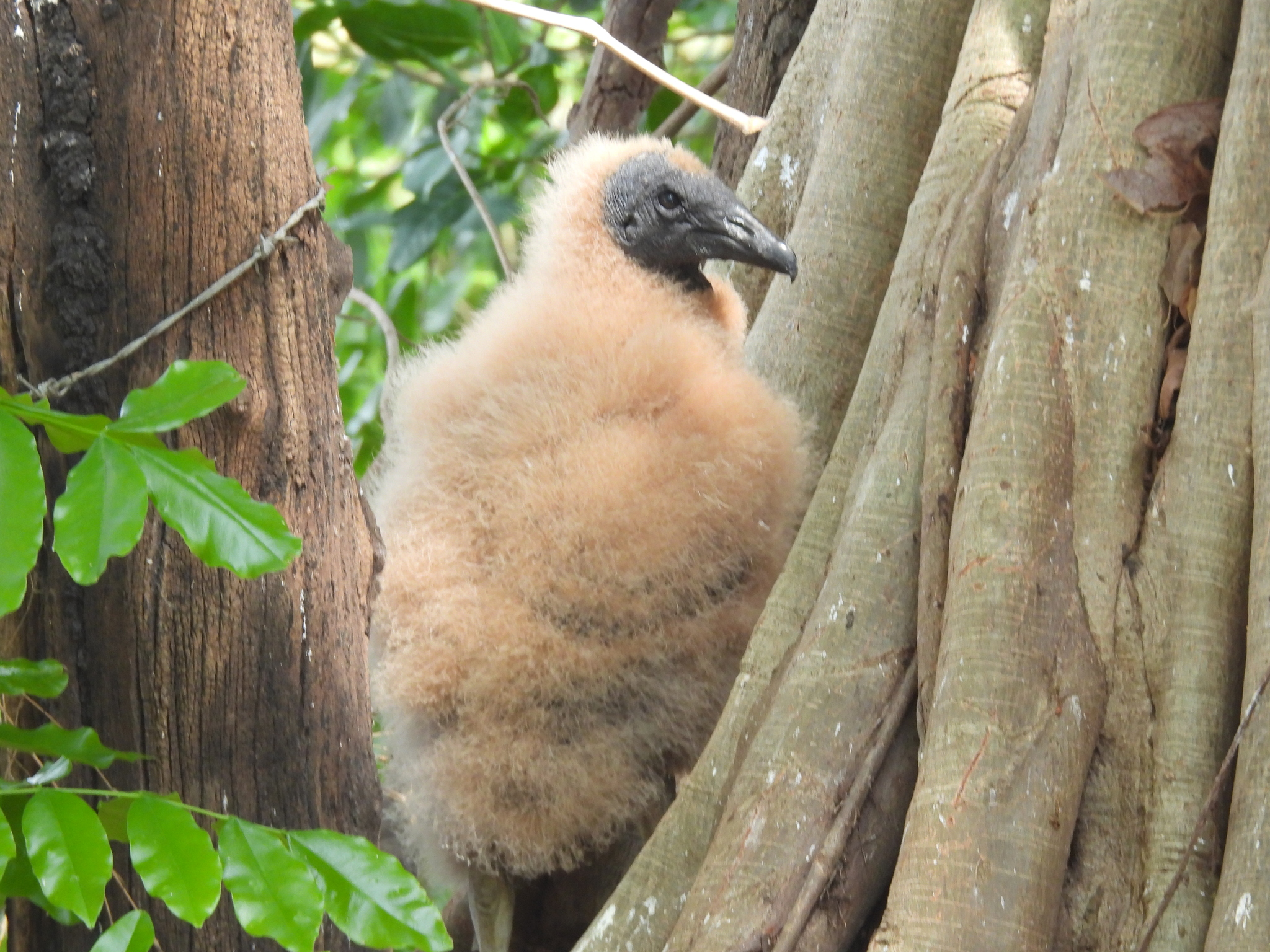
Juvenile

=== Feeding ===
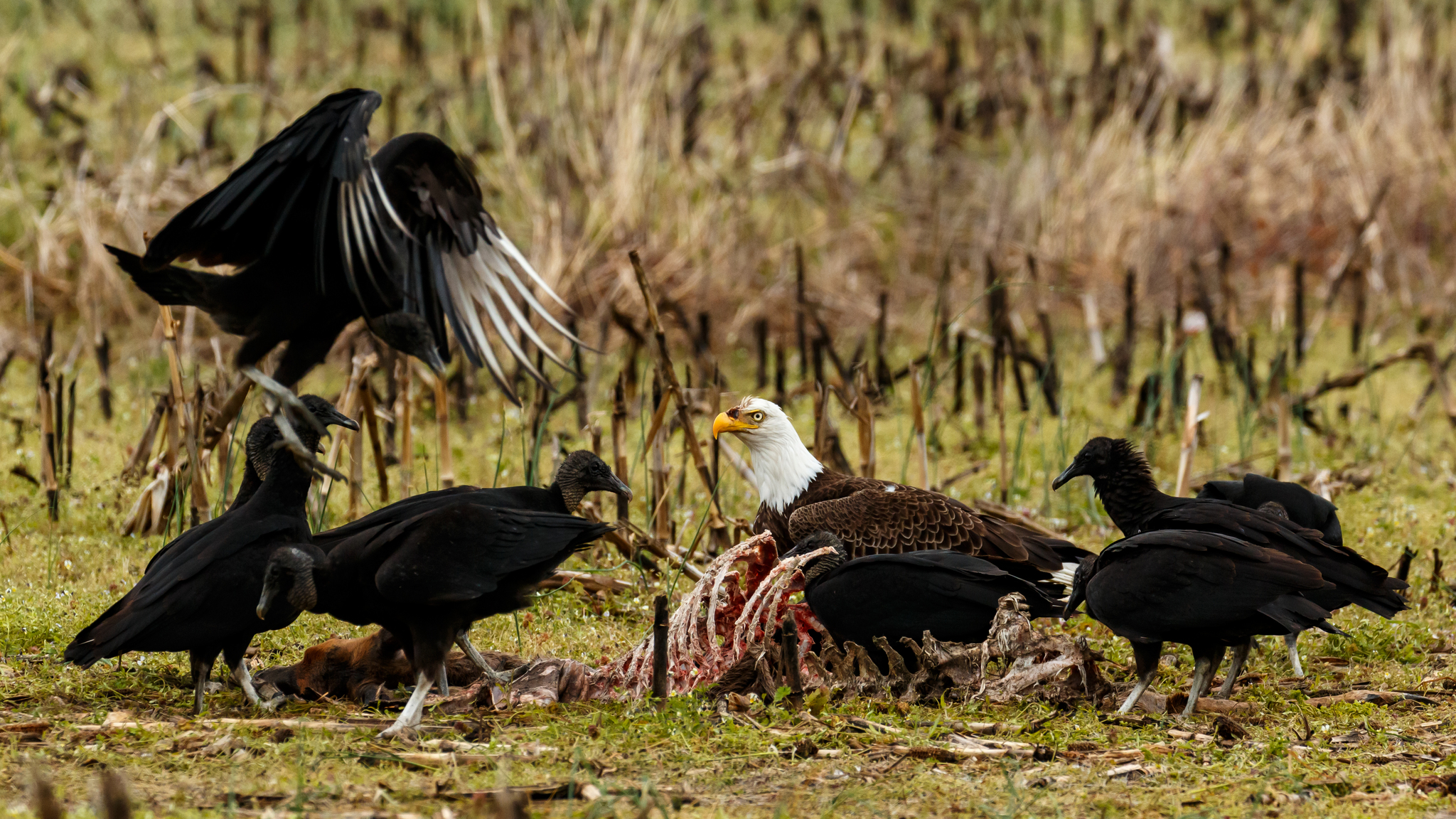
Black vultures and a bald eagle feeding on a white-tailed deer carcass

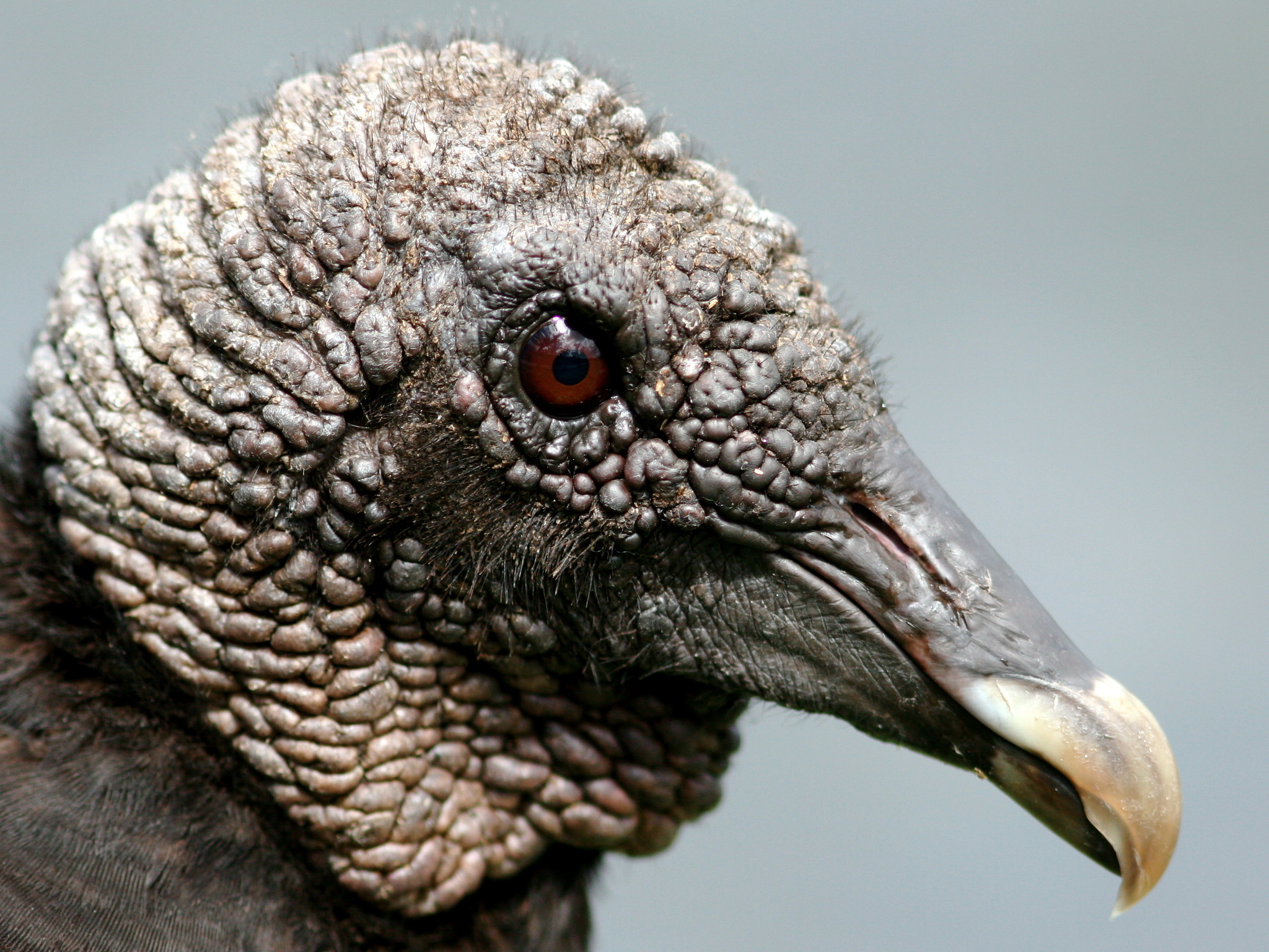
Head close-up, in Florida

The black vulture eats mainly carrion in natural settings. In areas populated by humans, it may scavenge at garbage dumps for refuse, offal, and other discarded edible waste, but also takes eggs, fruit (both ripe and rotting), fish, dung and ripe/decomposing plant material and can kill or injure newborn or incapacitated mammals. Like other vultures, it plays an important role in the ecosystem by disposing of carrion which could otherwise spread disease. The black vulture locates food either by sight or by following vultures of the genus Cathartes to carcasses. These vultures—the turkey vulture, the lesser yellow-headed vulture, and the greater yellow-headed vulture—forage by detecting the scent of ethyl mercaptan, a gas produced by the beginnings of decay in dead animals. Their heightened ability to detect odors allows them to search for carrion below the forest canopy. The black vulture is aggressive when feeding and may chase the slightly larger turkey vulture from carcasses.

The black vulture also occasionally feeds on livestock or deer. It is the only species of New World vulture which preys on cattle. It occasionally harasses cows giving birth, but primarily preys on newborn calves, lambs, and piglets. In its first few weeks, a calf will allow vultures to approach it. The vultures swarm the calf in a group and then peck at the calf's eyes, nose, or tongue. The calf then goes into shock and is killed by the vultures.

Black vultures have sometimes been observed removing and eating ticks from resting capybaras and Baird's tapir (Tapirus bairdii). These vultures are known to kill hatchlings of herons and seabirds on nesting colonies, and feed on domestic ducks, small birds, skunks, opossums, other small mammals, lizards, small snakes, young turtles and insects. Like other birds with scavenging habits, the black vulture presents resistance to pathogenic microorganisms and their toxins. Many mechanisms may explain this resistance. Anti-microbial agents may be secreted by the liver or stomach lining, or produced by microorganisms of the normal microbiota of the species.

Black vultures in Northern California have been observed snipping the umbilical cords of newborn sea lions and feeding on the placenta, an example of clever planning.

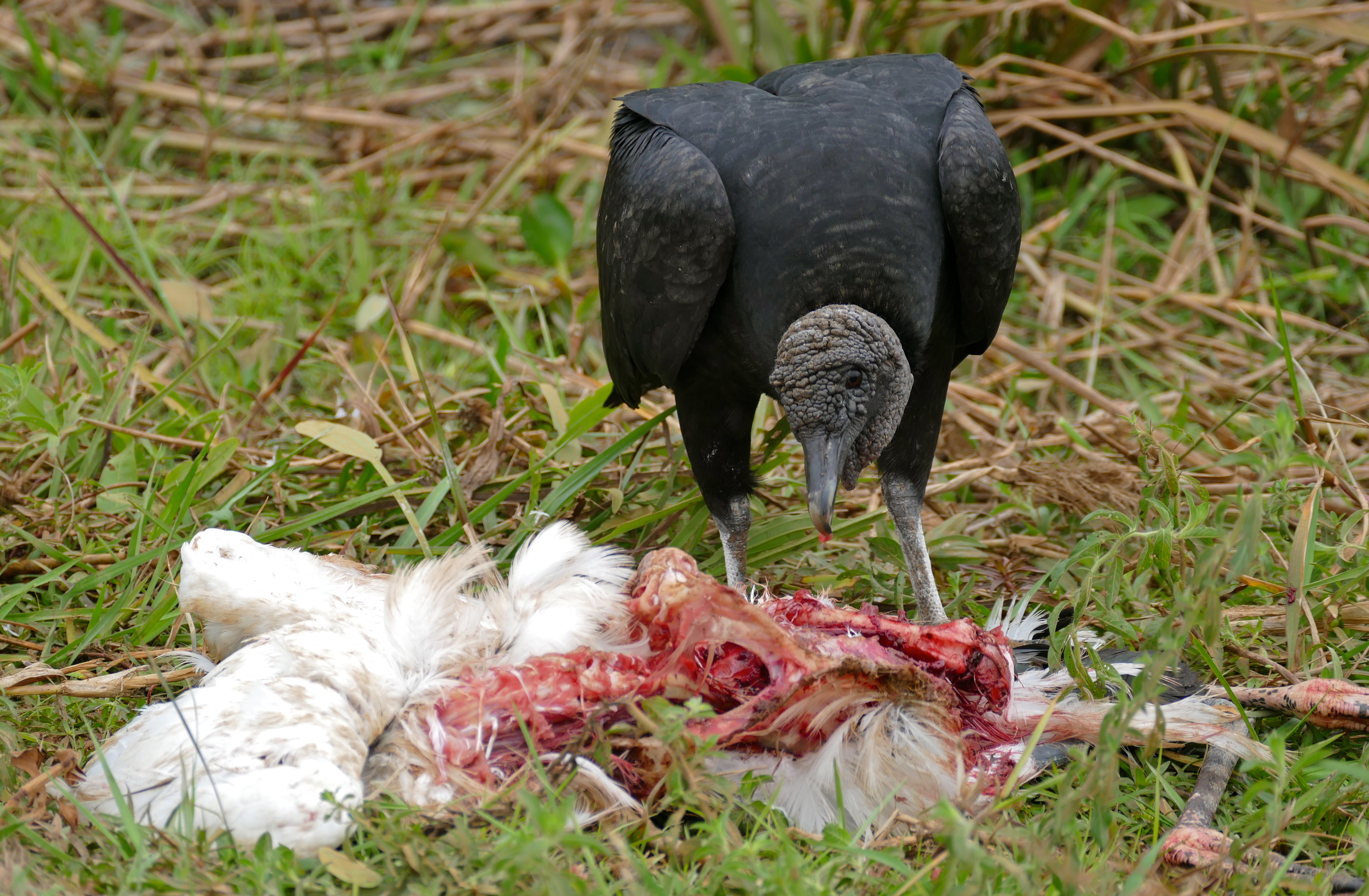
Feeding on a wood stork

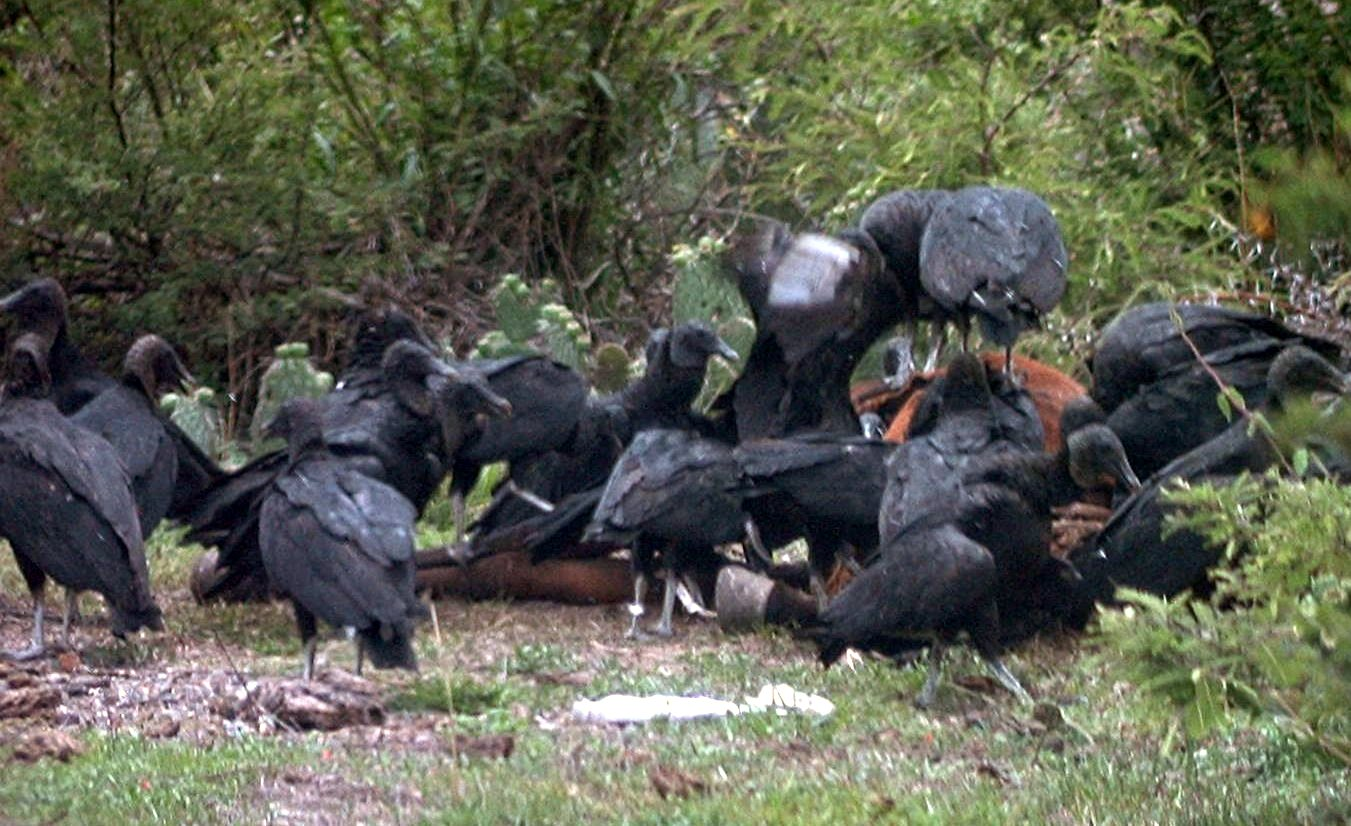
A flock on a horse carcass

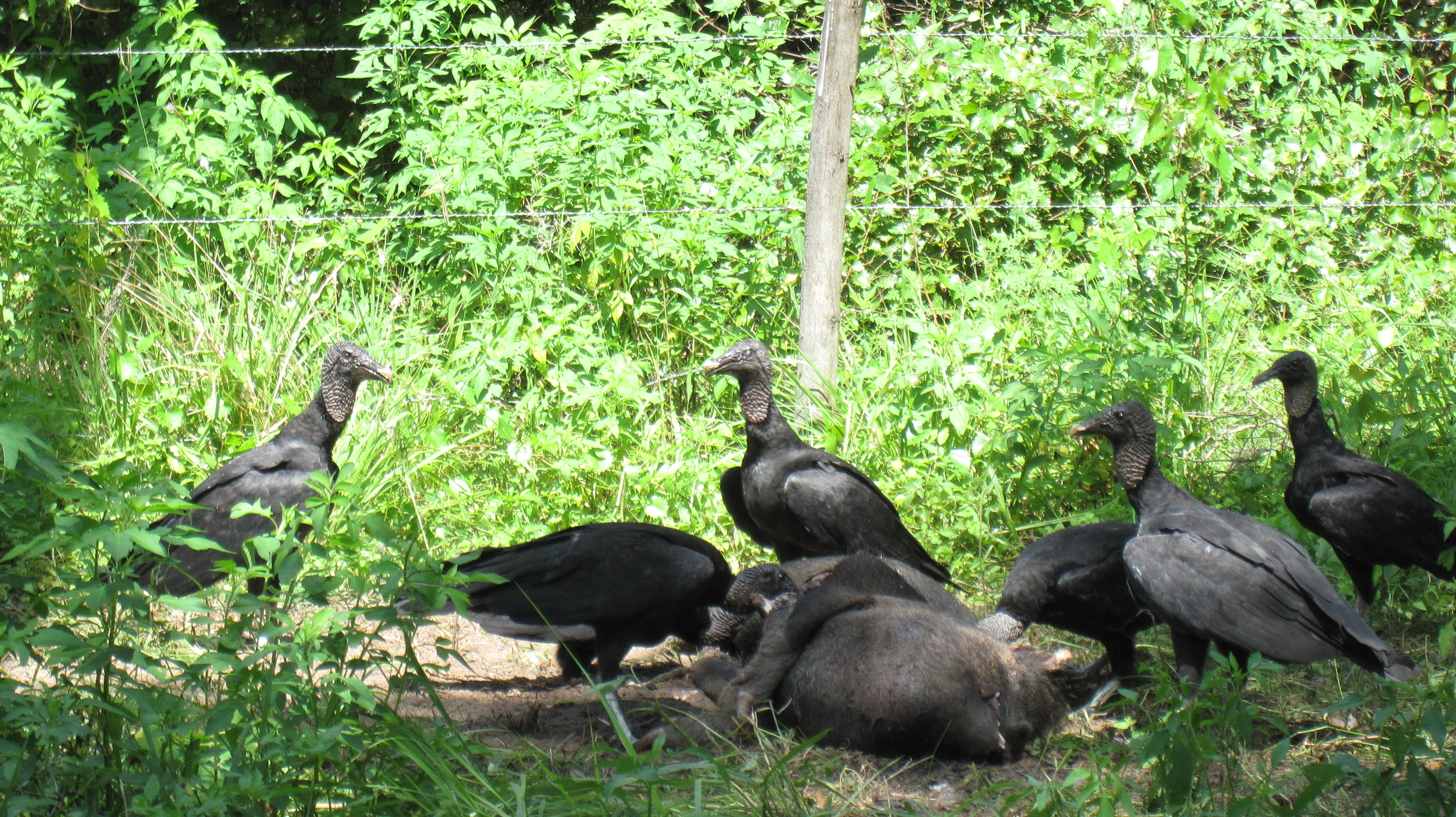
Six vultures on a wild hog carcass in Florida

== Legal protections ==
The black vulture receives special legal protections under the Migratory Bird Treaty Act of 1918 in the United States, by the Convention for the Protection of Migratory Birds in Canada, and by the Convention for the Protection of Migratory Birds and Game Mammals in Mexico. In the United States it is illegal to take, kill, or possess black vultures without a permit and violation of the law is punishable by a fine of up to US$15,000 and imprisonment of up to six months. It is listed as a species of Least Concern by the IUCN Red List. Its current population trend is unknown, but has a very large estimated population (50–100 million mature individuals), and it has not reached the threshold of inclusion as a threatened species, which requires a decline of more than 30% in ten years or three generations.

== Relationship with humans ==
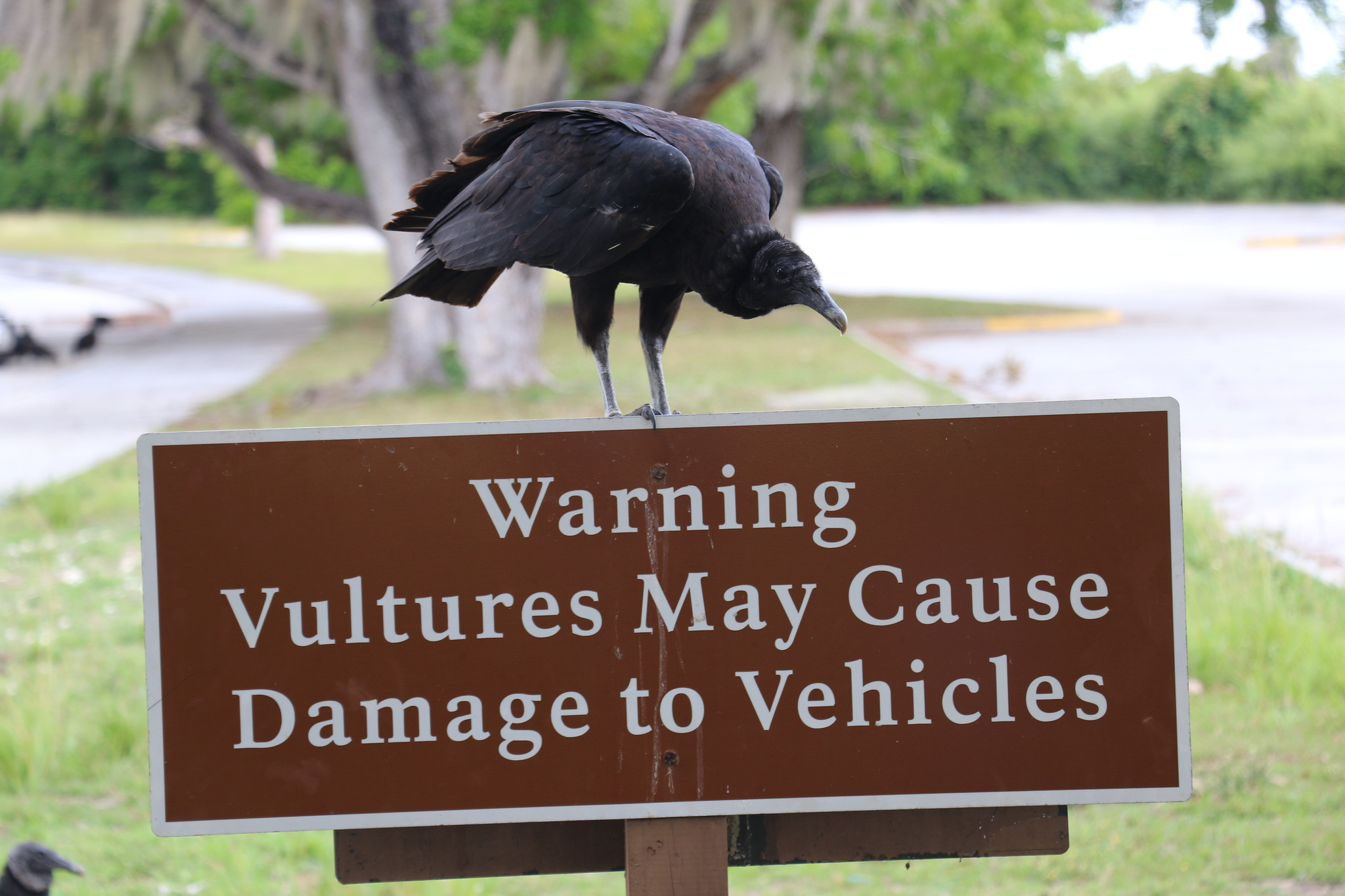
On a sign in Florida

The black vulture is considered a threat by cattle ranchers due to its predation on newborn cattle. However, because predation events are rarely directly witnessed, and vultures quickly flock to animal carcasses, it is unclear whether the majority of reported livestock deaths are actually attributable to vultures. As a defense, the vultures also "regurgitate a reeking and corrosive vomit."

The bird can be a threat to the safety of aerial traffic, especially when it congregates in large numbers in the vicinity of garbage dumps—as is the case in the Rio de Janeiro Tom Jobim International Airport. Between 1990 and 2024, black vultures have been involved in 382 collisions with civil aircraft in the United States.

== In popular culture ==
The black vulture appears in a variety of Maya hieroglyphics in Mayan codices. It is normally connected with either death or as a bird of prey. The vulture's glyph is often shown attacking humans. This species lacks the religious connections that the king vulture has. While some of the glyphs clearly show the black vulture's open nostril and hooked beak, some are assumed to be this species because they are vulture-like but lack the king vulture's knob and are painted black.

Black vultures are an important cultural symbol in Lima, Peru.

This vulture has appeared on two stamps: those of Suriname in 1990 and Nicaragua in 1994.
