= Mariana Ochoa Loayza =

Ecuadorian family

- Born: Piñas Canton
- Occupation: Writer

Mariana Ochoa Loayza is an Ecuadorian historian and writer. She has been the custodian of the Historical Archive of Guayaquil and was a member of the Ecuadorian Academy of Maritime and Fluvial History. Her best-known work is the compilation and analysis of the correspondence of the former President of Ecuador, Vicente Rocafuerte. She has also written about the history of El Oro Province.
