= Coragyps seductus =

Coragyps seductus Temporal range: Late Pleistocene

Scientific classification
- Kingdom: Animalia
- Phylum: Chordata
- Class: Aves
- Order: Accipitriformes
- Family: Cathartidae
- Genus: Coragyps
- Species: †C. seductus

Binomial name
- †Coragyps seductus Suárez 2020

Fossil species of bird

Coragyps seductus, the Cuban black vulture, is an extinct bird known from the Pleistocene of Cuba.
