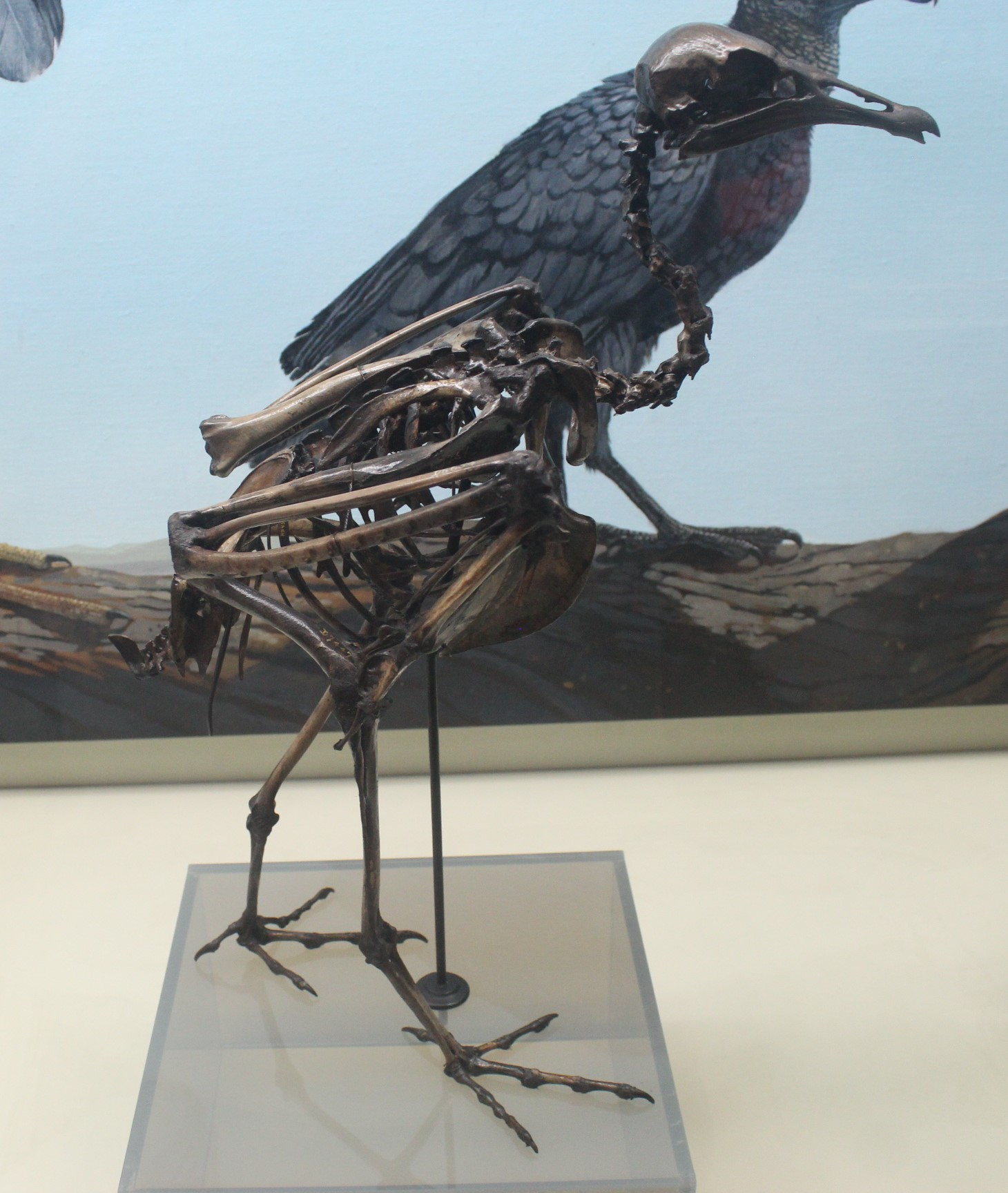
- Skeletal mount in the Page Museum at the La Brea Tar Pits

Scientific classification
- Kingdom: Animalia
- Phylum: Chordata
- Class: Aves
- Order: Accipitriformes
- Family: Cathartidae
- Genus: Coragyps
- Species: †C. occidentalis

Binomial name
- †Coragyps occidentalis Miller, 1909

= Coragyps occidentalis =

Coragyps occidentalis Temporal range: Pleistocene - Early Holocene

Extinct species of New World vulture

Coragyps occidentalis, the Pleistocene black vulture, is an extinct species of New World vulture that lived throughout North and South America during the Pleistocene. It was formerly thought to be the ancestor to the modern black vulture (C. atratus), but is now thought to have evolved from it; the modern black vulture is paraphyletic with respect to it.

== Taxonomy ==
Well documented from fossil bones, this species and the black vulture were previously thought to be chronospecies. Fossil (or subfossil) black vultures cannot necessarily be attributed to the Pleistocene or the recent species without further information: the same size variation found in the living bird was also present in its larger prehistoric relative. As the Pleistocene and current black vultures form an evolutionary continuum rather than splitting into two or more lineages, some included the Pleistocene taxa in C. atratus.

In 2022, a phylogenetic study using DNA extracted from a well-preserved fossil specimen found in 1904 near Lake Titicaca resolved the relationships of C. occidentalis. This study found that C. occidentalis to be nestled within the South American clade of C. atratus, having diverged from the southwestern South American clade around 300,000 - 400,000 years ago. While C. atratus is primarily a lowland species, C. occidentalis had specialized to colder high-elevation environments, growing larger and more robust in the process. Following this, it spread north to North America. C. occidentalis was specialized to feed on carrion from Pleistocene megafauna; following the Quaternary extinction event, it also went extinct.

Humans may have interacted with this species: a subfossil bone of the C. occidentalis was found in a Paleo Indian to Early Archaic (9000–8000 years BCE) midden at Five Mile Rapids near The Dalles, Oregon.

== Description ==
This species did not differ much from the modern black vulture in most aspects except size; it was some 10–15% larger. It also had a relatively flatter and wider bill. It filled the same ecological niche as the living form, but was more specialized to feed on larger animals, which may have been the cause for its extinction.

The Pleistocene black vulture showed size variation much like the modern species, with southern populations smaller than those from the north. These populations are classified as subspecies, with the larger northern populations known as Coragyps occidentalis occidentalis and the smaller populations known as C. o. mexicanus. The southern birds were of the same size as present-day northern black vultures and can only be distinguished by their somewhat stouter tarsometatarsus and the flatter and wider bills, and even then only with any certainty if the location where the fossils were found is known.

== Distribution ==
C. occidentalis was a high-altitude specialist, being primarily found throughout the Andes of South America north to the arid montane regions of the western United States. However, it could also venture into lower-elevation areas, as fossil specimens are known from lowland areas on both continents, as far east as Florida. It is thought that these lowland areas may have provided feeding opportunities, including trapped megafauna in the La Brea Tar Pits, mass accumulations of dead salmon in Oregon, and washed-up carcasses on the Florida coastal plain.
