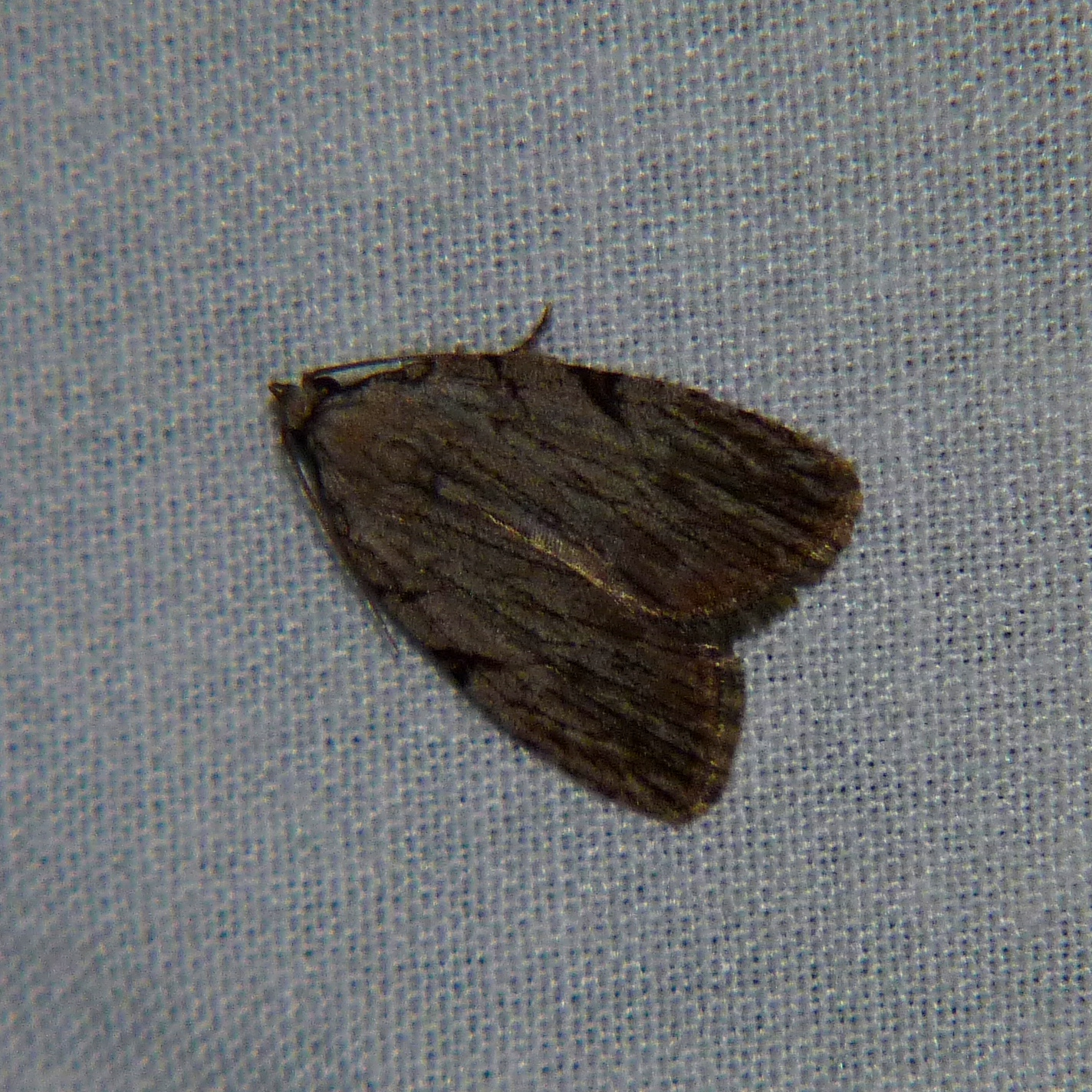

Scientific classification
- Kingdom: Animalia
- Phylum: Arthropoda
- Clade: Pancrustacea
- Class: Insecta
- Order: Lepidoptera
- Superfamily: Noctuoidea
- Family: Noctuidae
- Genus: Balsa
- Species: B. tristrigella

Binomial name
- Balsa tristrigella (Walker, 1866)

Synonyms
- Garzana tristrigella Walker, 1866; Balsa tristigella; Asisyra zelleri Grote, 1873

= Balsa tristrigella =

Species of moth

The three-lined balsa moth (Balsa tristrigella) is a species of moth of the family Noctuidae. It is found in eastern North America.

The wingspan is 25–30 mm (0.98–1.18 in). They are on wing from May to August.

The larvae feed on Crataegus species.
