= Balsas Canton =

Coordinates: 3.7626°S 79.8253°W

Balas Canton
- Canton
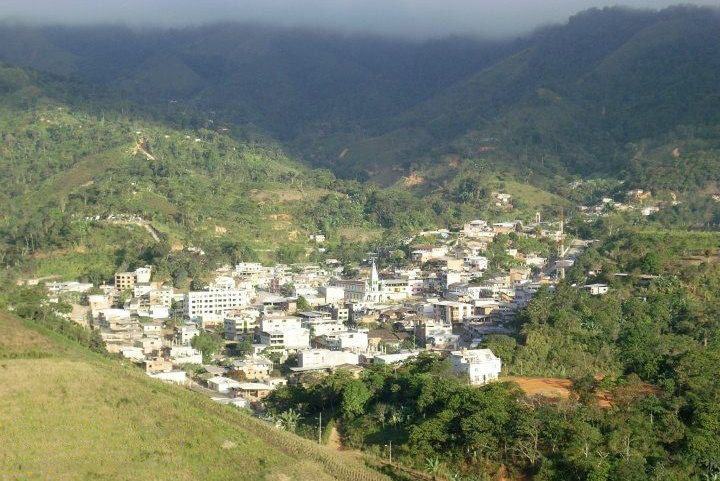
- Balsas, Ecuador

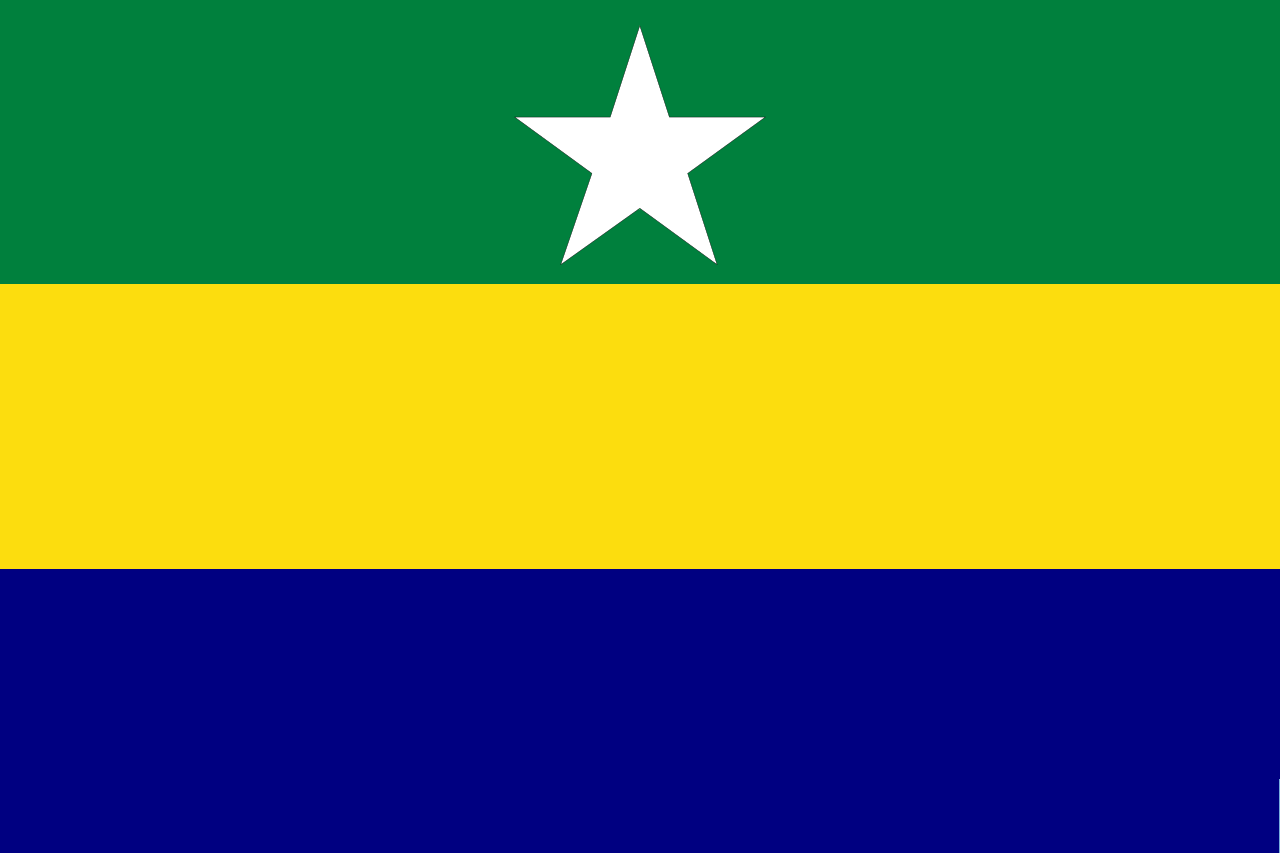
- Flag

- Location of El Oro Province in Ecuador

- Balsas Canton in El Oro Province
- Country: Ecuador
- Province: El Oro Province
- Seat: Balsas

Area
  - Total: 68.68 km^{2} (26.52 sq mi)

Population (2022 census)
  - Total: 7,875
  - Density: 114.7/km^{2} (297.0/sq mi)

Balsas is a canton in the Province of El Oro in Ecuador. The name of the canton is due to the abundant amount of balsa trees that existed in this area. The customs and traditions in Balsas are based on the influence brought by the first settlers from the Cantón Piñas, Zaruma, and part of the Province of Loja. Balsas is a privileged town, its location, natural resources, and economic conditions are unique conditions that have allowed it to aim towards development.

== History ==
In 1980, the first Civic Board for Cantonization was formed in Balsas, led by Professor Gerardo Chimbo and other collaborators. Their task was to prepare documentation and carry out the necessary procedures, but they were not successful due to the National Congress' refusal to process it, citing a freeze on cantonizations.

However, the ideals of cantonization persisted in the hearts of the people of Balsas. With renewed strength and great optimism, an important meeting was held on June 30, 1984 to establish a new Civic Board. This board had better insights and knowledge to resume the procedures, and as a result, on November 13, 1984, and July 26, 1985, CELIR visited Balsas. After verifying the socio-economic reality, they issued a favorable report to achieve the desired purpose.

The National Congress' Civil and Penal Commission received CELIR's report, analyzed it, and drafted the Cantonization Bill, which was then sent to the Congress Plenary for discussion and approval. The bill was approved in the sessions of March 27 and April 8, 1986, and then sent to the President of the Republic for its promulgation in the Official Register. Finally, on February 23, 1987, Balsas became the twelfth canton of the Province of El Oro through Legislative Decree No. 61, published in the Official Register No. 631. It is worth mentioning that information was collected about their ancestors, which tells that the first inhabitants who migrated from their native San Roque were Mr. Patrick and Simone, who arrived on beast and settled in what is now Balsas.

Source: "Brief Data of Canton Balsas" book.

== Economics and production ==
Balsas is distinguished as a center of poultry farming in Ecuador, due to its high production of birds, which represents a significant portion of the active economy in this canton.

== Limits ==
To the North and East, Balsas borders the Piñas Canton.

To the South it borders with the Province of Loja (Paltas).

To the West, it borders Canton Marcabelí.

== Informative data ==
Population: 8,000 inhabitants (4,000 women and 4,000 men).

Parish of Balsas: 8,000 inhabitants.

Parish of Bellamaría: 600

== Demographics ==
Ethnic groups as of the Ecuadorian census of 2010:

- Mestizo 86.2%
- White 6.2%
- Montubio 4.7%
- Afro-Ecuadorian 2.8%
- Indigenous 0.0%
- Other 0.1%
