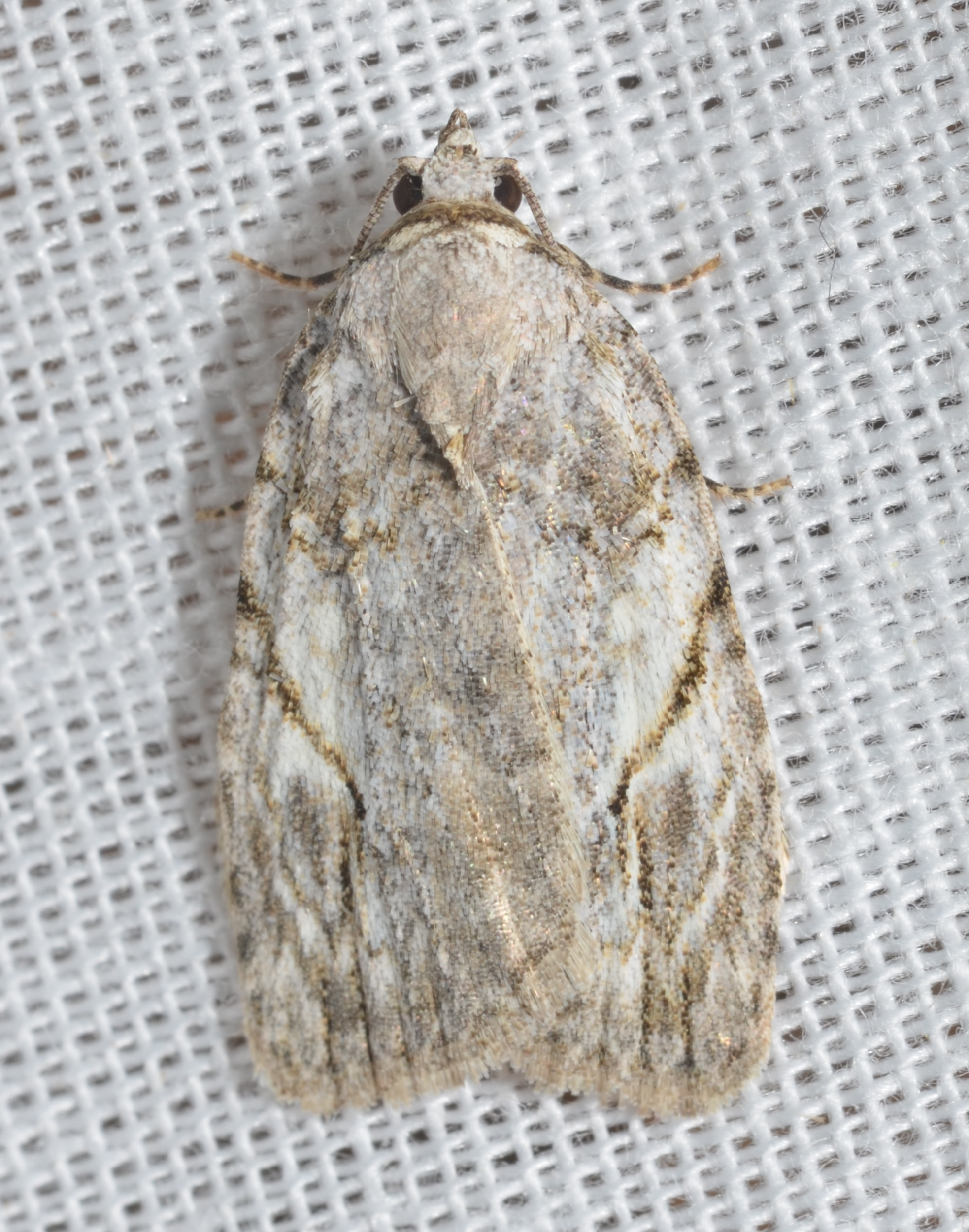

Scientific classification
- Kingdom: Animalia
- Phylum: Arthropoda
- Class: Insecta
- Order: Lepidoptera
- Superfamily: Noctuoidea
- Family: Noctuidae
- Genus: Balsa
- Species: B. labecula

Binomial name
- Balsa labecula (Grote, 1880)

= Balsa labecula =

Species of moth

Balsa labecula, the white-blotched balsa, is a species of moth in the family Noctuidae (the owlet moths). It is found in North America.
