= Balsa malana =

Scientific classification
- Domain: Eukaryota
- Kingdom: Animalia
- Phylum: Arthropoda
- Class: Insecta
- Order: Lepidoptera
- Superfamily: Noctuoidea
- Family: Noctuidae
- Genus: Balsa
- Species: B. malana

Binomial name
- Balsa malana (Fitch, 1856)

Species of moth

Balsa malana, the many-dotted appleworm, is a species of moth in the family Noctuidae (the owlet moths). It is found in North America.

The MONA or Hodges number for Balsa malana is 9662.
