= Das Balsas River =

Das Balsas River or Rio das Balsas may refer to several rivers in Brazil:

- Das Balsas River (Bahia)
- Das Balsas River (Maranhão)
- Das Balsas River (Tocantins)

== See also ==
- Balsas (disambiguation) § Rivers
