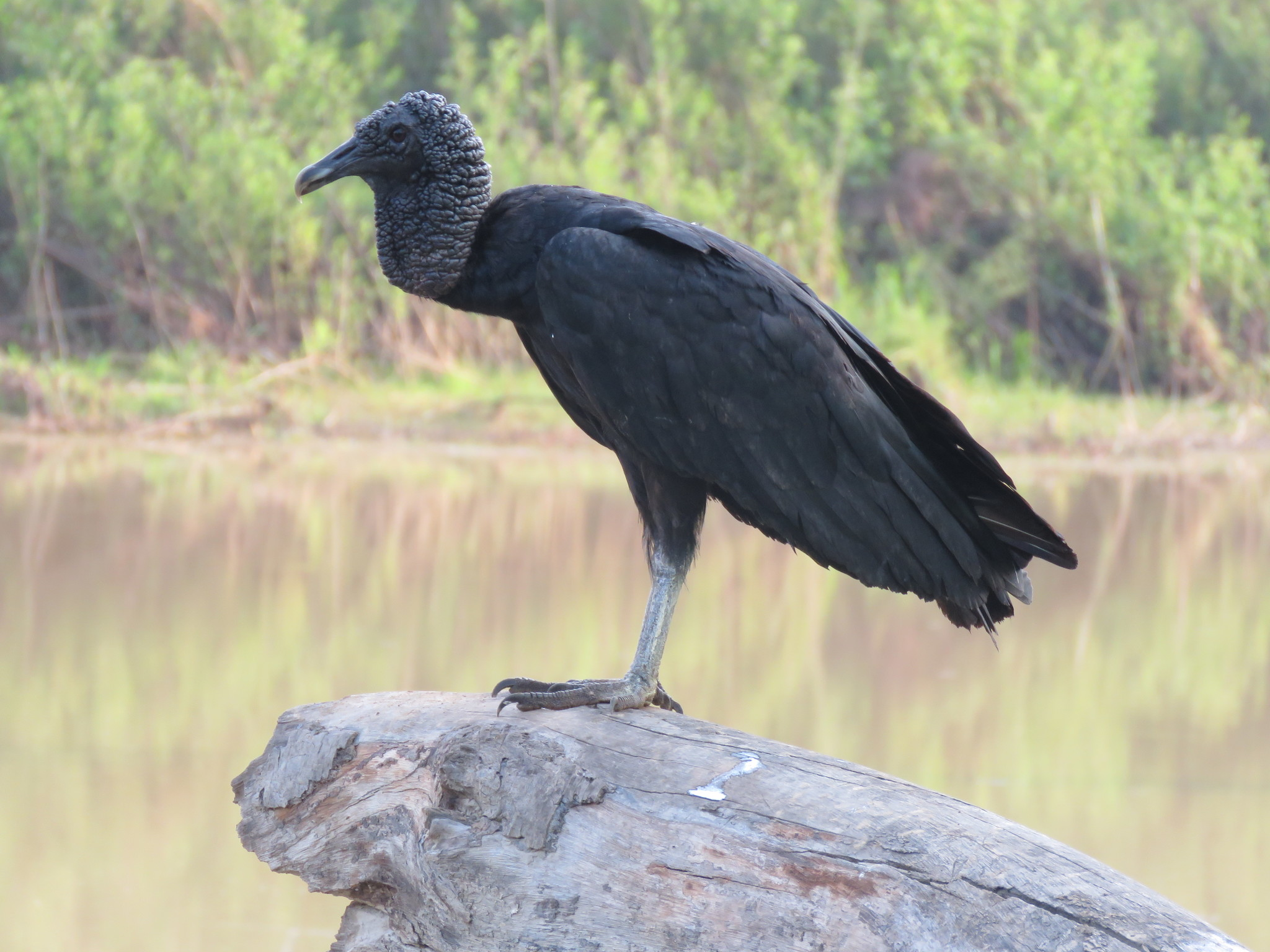
- Black vulture (Coragyps atratus)

Scientific classification
- Kingdom: Animalia
- Phylum: Chordata
- Class: Aves
- Order: Accipitriformes
- Family: Cathartidae
- Genus: Coragyps; Le Maout, 1853

Type species
- Vultur atratus Bechstein, 1793

Species
- Coragyps atratus; †Coragyps occidentalis; †Coragyps seductus

= Coragyps =

Genus of New World vulture

Coragyps is a genus of New World vulture that contains the black vulture (Coragyps atratus) and two extinct relatives.

== Taxonomy ==
The genus Coragyps was introduced in 1853 by the French naturalist Emmanuel Le Maout to accommodate the black vulture.

=== Etymology ===
The name combines the Ancient Greek korax meaning "raven" with gups meaning "vulture".

== Fossil record ==
One extinct species is the 'western' black vulture, Coragyps occidentalis, a larger ancestral relative of the modern species which lived in North America during much of the Pleistocene epoch; however, genetic evidence indicates that C. occidentalis may not be a true species of its own, as it is nested within the modern black vulture. The other is the Cuban black vulture, Coragyps seductus, known from the Pleistocene of Cuba.
