= Balsa, Brazil =

Balsa
- Coordinates: 3°8′20″S 60°5′8″W
- Sovereign state: Brazil
- State: Amazonas

Balsa is a headland on the opposite side of the Amazon River from Manaus, Amazonas, Brazil. The AM-070 road bridge comes from Santo Agostinho to the headland. It has a dock and slipway that goes by the same name.
