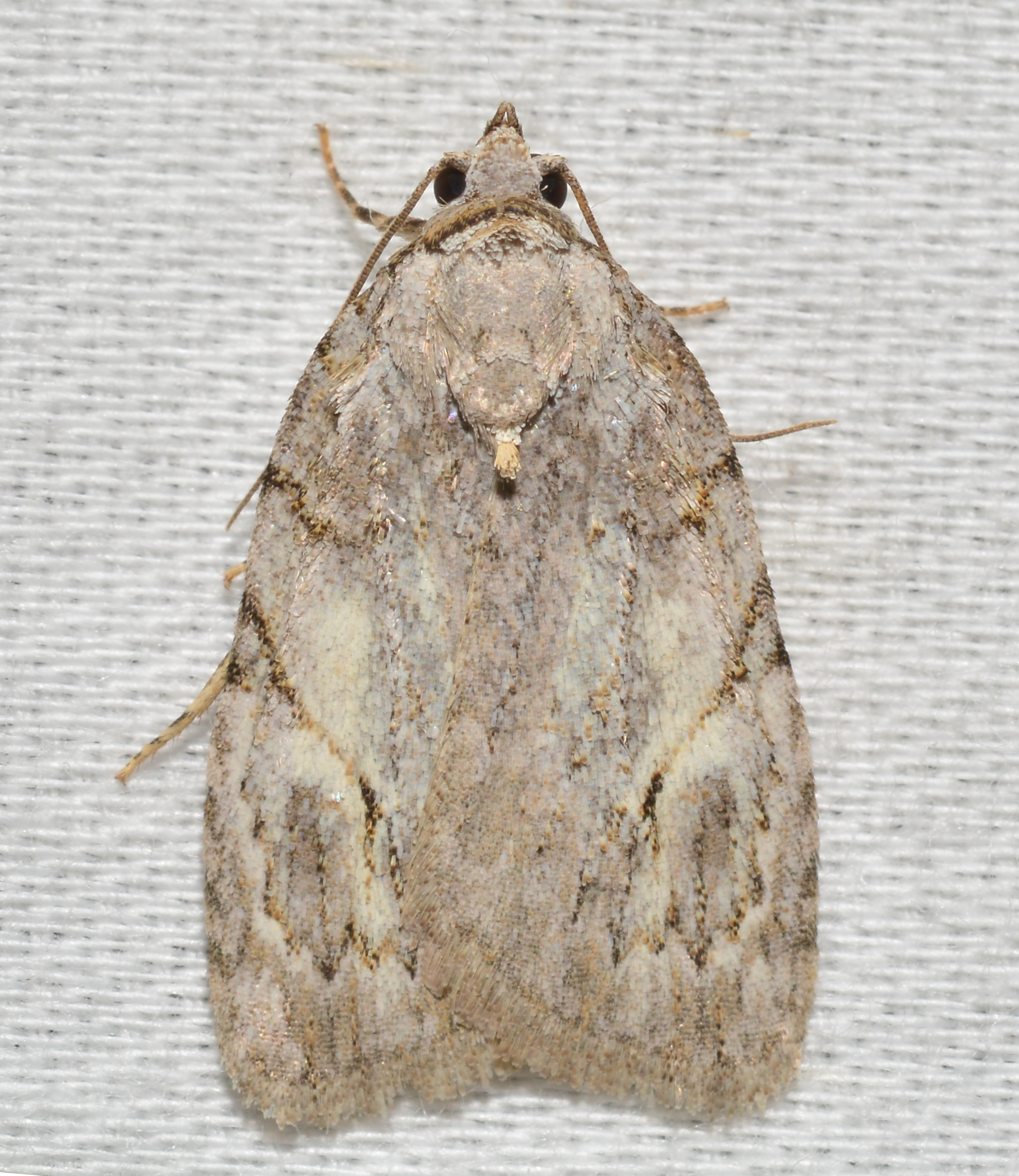
- Balsa labecula

Scientific classification
- Kingdom: Animalia
- Phylum: Arthropoda
- Class: Insecta
- Order: Lepidoptera
- Superfamily: Noctuoidea
- Family: Noctuidae
- Subfamily: Balsinae
- Genus: Balsa; Walker, 1860

= Balsa (moth) =

Genus of moths

Balsa is a genus of moths of the family Noctuidae.

== Species ==
- Balsa labecula (Grote, 1880)
- Balsa malana (Fitch, 1856)
- Balsa tristigella (Walker, 1866)
