= Balsa, Hungary =

Village in Hungary

Balsa
- Location within Hungary
- Country: Hungary
- County: Szabolcs-Szatmár-Bereg County

Population (2015)
  - Total: 838
- Time zone: UTC+1 (CET)
  - Summer (DST): UTC+2 (CEST)

Balsa is a village in Szabolcs-Szatmár-Bereg County, in the Northern Great Plain region of eastern Hungary.

In the 19th and 20th centuries, a small Jewish community lived in the village. In 1880, 100 Jews lived there, most of whom were murdered in the Holocaust. The community had a Jewish cemetery.
