= Piñas Canton =

Canton of El Oro province, Ecuador

Coordinates: 03°40′00″S 79°39′00″W

Piñas is a canton in the El Oro Province, Ecuador. Its seat is Piñas. It is also known as the "Orchid of The Andes" because of the many orchids grown nearby. The town was named Piñas by Juan de Loayza, in honor of his homeland Piñas in Spain. It is located 1,126 metres (3,694 ft) above sea level.

The canton was created on November 8, 1940. It is bordered to the north by Atahualpa, to the south by Loja, to the east by Portovelo and Zaruma and to the west by Balsas and Marcabelí. Economic activity includes agriculture such as cattle raising and cocoa and sugar cane growing.

== Parishes ==
The canton has 9 parishes (6 rural and 3 urban) totalling approximately 40,000 inhabitants.

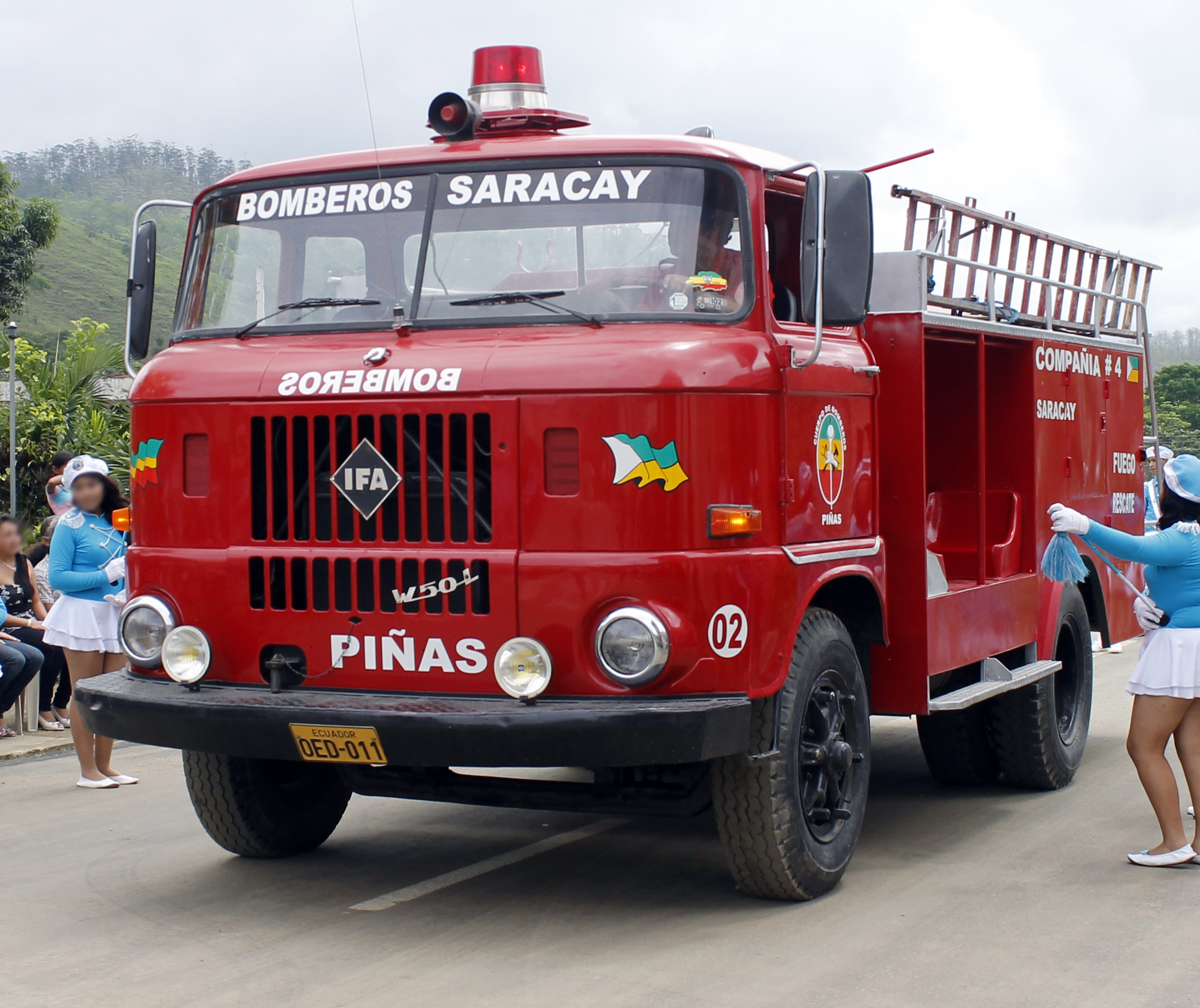
IFA W 50 fire engine of the Saracay fire department

- Urban parishes:
  - Piñas (administrative centre)
  - La Susaya
  - Piñas grande
- Rural parishes:
  - Piedras
  - Saracay
  - Capiro
  - La bocana
  - San Roque
  - Moro Moro

== Demographics ==
Ethnic groups as of the Ecuadorian census of 2010:

- Mestizo 86.6%
- White 6.6%
- Montubio 4.3%
- Afro-Ecuadorian 2.2%
- Indigenous 0.1%
- Other 0.1%

== Tourism ==
- The "Orquideario" is an orchid garden located in the town and managed by the Fundación Piñas Oasis Ecologico.
- Buenaventura Forest, located on the road to the coast a few minutes away from Piñas, is a private nature reserve whose attractions include 30 species of hummingbird and the rare El Oro parakeet and Ecuadorian tapaculo. It is administered by the Fundación de Conservación Jocotoco and its infrastructure includes paths and interpretation stations for visitors.
- The Patagrande Mirador is a center of Catholic Christian adoration. Processions take place here during Holy Week and on May 3 (Finding of the Holy Cross).
- Other attractions include the tourist complex at Tarapal and crafts at Piedra Blanca and Palo Solo, La Cabaña del Café ubicada en Mirmir sector Lozumbe Parroquia San Roque.

== Cuisine ==
Typical dishes of the area include "repe" (a creamy green banana soup) and "biscochuelo", among others
