= Balsas, Ecuador =

Balsas
- Town
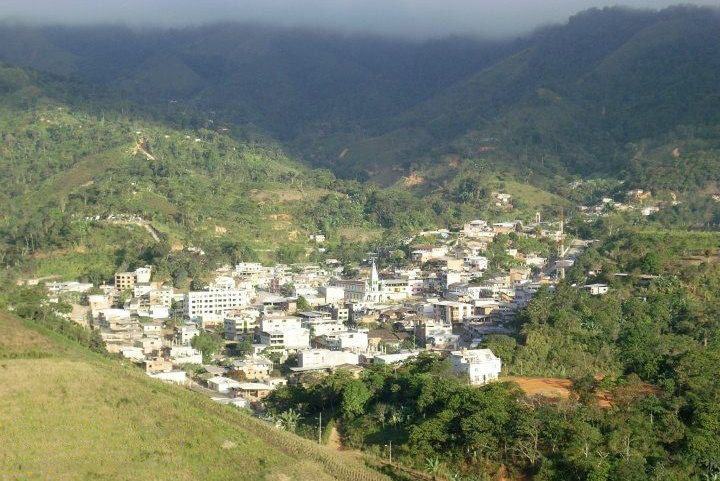

- Location within Ecuador
- Coordinates: 3°47′0″S 79°49′0″W
- Country: Ecuador
- Province: El Oro
- Canton: Balsas Canton

Area
  - Total: 1.52 km^{2} (0.59 sq mi)

Population (2022 census)
  - Total: 4,500
  - Density: 3,000/km^{2} (7,700/sq mi)
- Time zone: UTC-5 (ECT)

Balsas is a town in the south of the El Oro Province in Ecuador. It is the seat of the Balsas Canton. At the time of census 2001 it had a population of 3,110.
