= 1991 in paleontology =

Paleontology or palaeontology is the study of prehistoric life forms on Earth through the examination of plant and animal fossils. This includes the study of body fossils, tracks (ichnites), burrows, cast-off parts, fossilised feces (coprolites), palynomorphs and chemical residues. Because humans have encountered fossils for millennia, paleontology has a long history both before and after becoming formalized as a science. This article records significant discoveries and events related to paleontology that occurred or were published in the year 1991.

== Plants ==
=== Angiosperms ===
Name	Novelty	Status	Authors	Age	Unit	Location	Notes	Images
Cruciptera	Gen et comb nov	valid	Brown	Middle Eocene	Clarno Formation	USA; Oregon	A walnut relative. Moved from Tetrapteris simsoni (1940)	
Soleredera	Gen et sp nov	Valid	Erwin & Stockey	Eocene; Ypresian	Okanagan Highlands; Princeton Chert	Canada; British Columbia	A lilialean genus of uncertain placement	

== Arthropods ==
=== Insects ===
Name	Novelty	Status	Authors	Age	Unit	Location	Notes	Images
Anochetus brevidentatus	Sp nov	Valid	MacKay	Burdigalian	Dominican amber	Dominican Republic	A ponerin ant	
Stenolestes hispanicus	Sp nov	Valid	Nel	Vallesian	Bellver de Cerdanya	Spain	A sieblosiid damselfly	Stenolestes hispanicus

== Mollusca ==
=== Newly named bivalves ===
Name	Novelty	Status	Authors	Age	Unit	Location	Notes	Images
Similodonta wahli	Sp nov	Valid	Isakar	Late Ordovician	Arina Formation	Estonia		

== Archosauromorphs ==
- Sankar Chatterjee's discovery of a possible Triassic bird, Protoavis, if genuine, would push avian origins back almost 70 million years. The find ignites controversy over the connection between dinosaurs and birds.

=== Newly named dinosaurs ===
Data courtesy of George Olshevsky's dinosaur genera list.

Name	Status	Authors	Age	Unit	Location	Notes	Images
Alvarezsaurus	Valid taxon	Jose Bonaparte	Late Cretaceous (Santonian)	Bajo de la Carpa Formation	Argentina	An alvarezsaurid.	Alvarezsaurus
Amargasaurus	Valid taxon	Salgado and Jose Bonaparte	Early Cretaceous (Barremian)	La Amarga Formation	Argentina	A dicraeosaurid. with Spines on its Neck	Amargasaurus
Amurosaurus	Valid taxon	Bolotsky & Kurzanov	Late Cretaceous (Maastrichtian)	Udurchukan Formation	Russia; China	A lambeosaurine hadrosaurid.	
Andesaurus	Valid taxon	Calvo and Bonaparte	Late Cretaceous (Santonian)	Bajo de la Carpa Formation	Argentina	An alvarezsaurid.	
Becklespinax	Junior synonym	George Olshevsky.	Early Cretaceous (Valanginian)	Wadhurst Clay Formation	UK	A junior objective synonym of Altispinax; new genus for "Acrocanthosaurus" altispinax Paul (1988).	
Euronychodon	Valid taxon	Telles-Antunes & Sigogneau-Russell	Late Cretaceous (Maastrichtian)		Portugal; Uzbekistan	A troodontid.	
Janenschia	Valid taxon	Wild	Late Jurassic (Kimmeridgian-Tithonian)	Tendaguru Formation	Tanzania	A non-titanosauriform macronarian; new genus for "Gigantosaurus" robustus E. Fraas (1908).	
Protognathosaurus	Valid taxon	George Olshevsky	Middle Jurassic (Bajocian)	Xiashaximiao Formation	China	A sauropod of uncertain affinities.	
"Rioarribasaurus"	Junior synonym	Hunt & S.G. Lucas	Late Triassic (late Norian-Rhaetian)			A junior synonym of Coelophysis.	
"Seismosaurus"	Junior synonym	Gillette					
Tarascosaurus	Valid taxon	Le Loeuff and Buffetaut			France		
Taveirosaurus	Valid taxon	Telles-Antunes & Sigogneau-Russell	Late Cretaceous		Portugal; Spain	An ornithischian of unknown affinities.	
Tochisaurus	Valid taxon	Kurzanov and Osmolska	Cretaceous		Mongolia		
"Ultrasauros"	Junior synonym	George Olshevsky	Late Jurassic (Kimmeridgian)	Morrison Formation		Junior synonym of Supersaurus; replacement name for Ultrasaurus Jensen 1985 (preoccupied).	
Valdoraptor	Valid taxon	George Olshevsky	Early Cretaceous (late Valanginian)	Tunbridge Wells Formation	UK	An ornithomimosaur; new genus for "Megalosaurus" oweni Lydekker (1889).	
Velocisaurus	Valid taxon	Jose Bonaparte			Argentina	A Noasaur.	Velocisaurus

=== Newly named birds ===
Name	Status	Novelty	Authors	Age	Unit	Location	Notes	Images
Aidemedia chascax	Valid	Sp. nov.	Helen F. James Storrs L. Olson	Holocene	Oahu	USA (Hawaii)	A Fringillidae, Carduelinae.	
Aidemedia lutetiae	Valid	Gen. nov. et Sp. nov.	Helen F. James Storrs L. Olson	Holocene	Molokai	USA (Hawaii)	A Fringillidae, Carduelinae, this is the type species of the new genus.	
Aidemedia zanclops	Valid	Sp. nov.	Helen F. James Storrs L. Olson	Holocene	Oahu	USA (Hawaii)	A Fringillidae, Carduelinae.	
Apteribis brevis	Valid	Sp. nov.	Storrs L. Olson Helen F. James	Holocene	Maui	USA (Hawaii)	A Threskiornithidae.	
Asiahesperornis bazhanovi	Valid	Gen. nov. et Sp. nov.	Lev A. Nessov B. V. Prizemlin	Late Cretaceous	Late Campanian-Early Maastrichtian, Eginsai Formation	Kazakhstan	A Hesperornithiformes Fürbringer, 1888, Hesperornithidae Marsh, 1872.	
Branta hylobadistes	Valid	Gen. nov. et Sp. nov.	Storrs L. Olson Helen F. James	Holocene	Maui	USA (Hawaii)	An Anatidae.	
Chelychelynechen quassus	Valid	Gen. nov. et Sp. nov.	Storrs L. Olson Helen F. James	Holocene	Kauai	USA (Hawaii)	An Anatidae, a moa-nalo, this is the type species of the genus.	
Chloridops regiskongi	Valid	Sp. nov.	Helen F. James Storrs L. Olson	Holocene	Oahu	USA (Hawaii)	A Fringillidae, Carduelinae.	
Chloridops wahi	Valid	Sp. nov.	Helen F. James Storrs L. Olson	Holocene	Oahu	USA (Hawaii)	A Fringillidae, Carduelinae.	
Circus dossenus	Valid	Sp. nov.	Storrs L. Olson Helen F. James	Holocene	Molokai	USA (Hawaii)	An Accipitridae.	
Ciridops tenax	Valid	Sp. nov.	Helen F. James Storrs L. Olson	Holocene	Kauai	USA (Hawaii)	A Fringillidae, Carduelinae.	
Corvus impluviatus	Valid	Sp. nov.	Helen F. James Storrs L. Olson	Holocene	Oahu	USA (Hawaii)	A Corvidae.	
Corvus viriosus	Valid	Sp. nov.	Helen F. James Storrs L. Olson	Holocene	Oahu	USA (Hawaii)	A Corvidae.	
Dendroscansor decurvirostris	Valid	Gen. nov et Sp. nov.	Philip R. Millener Trevor H. Worthy	Late Pleistocene	Otira Glacial Age	New Zealand	An Acanthisittidae.	
Grallistrix auceps	Valid	Sp. nov.	Storrs L. Olson Helen F. James	Holocene	Kauai	USA (Hawaii)	A Strigidae.	
Grallistrix erdmani	Valid	Sp. nov.	Storrs L. Olson Helen F. James	Holocene	Maui	USA (Hawaii)	A Strigidae.	
Grallistrix geleches	Valid	Gen. nov. et Sp. nov.	Storrs L. Olson Helen F. James	Holocene	Molokai	USA (Hawaii)	A Strigidae, the type species of the new genus.	
Grallistrix orion	Valid	Sp. nov.	Storrs L. Olson Helen F. James	Holocene	Oahu	USA (Hawaii)	A Strigidae.	
Hemignathus upupirostris	Valid	Sp. nov.	Helen F. James Storrs L. Olson	Holocene	Kauai	USA (Hawaii)	A Fringillidae, Carduelinae, transferred to the genus Akialoa Olson et James, 1995 by Olson et James, 1995.	
Horusornis vianeyliaudae	Valid	Gen. nov et Sp. nov.	Cécile Mourer-Chauviré	Late Eocene	Phosphorites du Quercy MP 17	France	An Accipitriformes, Horusornithidae Mourer-Chauviré, 1991, this is the type species of the new genus.	
Orthiospiza howarthi	Valid	Gen. nov et Sp. nov.	Helen F. James Storrs L. Olson	Holocene	Maui	USA (Hawaii)	A Fringillidae, Carduelinae, this is the type species of the new genus.	
Palaeocryptonyx hungaricus	Valid	Sp. nov.	Dénes Jánossy	Late Miocene	MN 13	Hungary	A Phasianidae, transferred to the genus Plioperdix Kretzoi, 1955 as Plioperdix hungarica Comb. nov. by Nikita V. Zelenkov & Andrey V. Panteleyev.	
Pavo aesculapi phasianoides	Valid	Subsp. nov.	Dénes Jánossy	Late Miocene		Hungary	A member of the family Phasianidae. Originally described as a subspecies of Pavo aesculapi; Zelenkov (2016) transferred it to the genus Syrmaticus and raised it to the rank of a separate species Syrmaticus phasianoides.	
Phalacrocorax kuehneanus	Valid	Sp. nov.	Thomas Schlüter	Late Pliocene	Minjingu	Tanzania	A Phalacrocoracidae.	
Phoeniconaias siamensis	Valid	Sp. nov.	Jacques Cheneval Léonard Ginsburg Cécile Mourer-Chauviré Benjavun Ratanasthien	Late Early Miocene	Li Mae	Thailand	A Phoenicopteridae.	
Porzana estramosi veterior	Valid	Subsp. nov.	Dénes Jánossy	Late Miocene		Hungary	A member of the family Rallidae. Originally described as a subspecies of Porzana estramosi; Zelenkov (2017) transferred it to the genus Zapornia and raised it to the rank of a separate species Zapornia veterior.	
Porzana keplerorum	Valid	Sp. nov.	Storrs L. Olson Helen F. James	Holocene	Maui	USA (Hawaii)	A Rallidae.	
Porzana menehune	Valid	Sp. nov.	Storrs L. Olson Helen F. James	Holocene	Molokai	USA (Hawaii)	A Rallidae.	
Porzana ralphorum	Valid	Sp. nov.	Storrs L. Olson Helen F. James	Holocene	Oahu	USA (Hawaii)	A Rallidae.	
Porzana severnsi	Valid	Sp. nov.	Storrs L. Olson Helen F. James	Holocene	Maui	USA (Hawaii)	A Rallidae.	
Porzana ziegleri	Valid	Sp. nov.	Storrs L. Olson Helen F. James	Holocene	Oahu	USA (Hawaii)	A Rallidae.	
Protoavis texensis	Valid	Gen. nov. et Sp. nov.	Sankar Chatterjee	Late Trias	Late Carnian-Early Norian	USA (Texas)	A Protoaviformes Chatterjee, 1991, Protoaviformes Chatterjee, 1991, the type and only species of the genus, no longer considered a bird.	
Pseudodontornis tshulensis	Valid	Sp. nov.	Aleksandr O. Averianov Andrei V. Panteleyev Olga R. Potapova Lev A. Nessov	Late Paleocene	Landenian	Kazakhstan	A Pseudodontornithidae Lambrecht, 1933.	
Pseudoseisuropsis nehuen	Valid	Gen. nov. et Sp. nov.	Jorge I. Noriega	Early Pleistocene	Miramar Formation	Argentina	A Furnariidae, Philydorinae, this is the type species of the new genus.	
Ptaiochen pau	Valid	Gen. nov. et Sp. nov.	Storrs L. Olson Helen F. James	Holocene	Maui	USA (Hawaii)	An Anatidae, a moa-nalo, this is the type species of the genus.	
Pterodroma jugabilis	Valid	Sp. nov.	Storrs L. Olson Helen F. James	Holocene	Oahu	USA (Hawaii)	A Procellariidae.	
Rallicrex polgardiensis	Valid	Sp. nov.	Dénes Jánossy	Late Miocene	MN 13	Hungary	A member of the family Rallidae. Originally described as a species of Rallicrex; Zelenkov (2017) transferred this species to the genus Rallus.	
Telespiza persecutrix	Valid	Sp. nov.	Helen F. James Storrs L. Olson	Holocene	Oahu, Kauai	USA (Hawaii)	A Fringillidae, Carduelinae.	
Telespiza ypsilon	Valid	Sp. nov.	Helen F. James Storrs L. Olson	Holocene	Molokai, Maui	USA (Hawaii)	A Fringillidae, Carduelinae.	
Thambetochen xanion	Valid	Sp. nov.	Storrs L. Olson Helen F. James	Holocene	Oahu	USA (Hawaii)	An Anatidae, a moa-nalo.	
Tyto campiterrae	Valid	Sp. nov.	Dénes Jánossy	Late Miocene	MN 13	Hungary	A Tytonidae.	
Vangulifer mirandus	Valid	Gen. nov. et Sp. nov.	Helen F. James Storrs L. Olson	Holocene	Maui	USA (Hawaii)	A Fringillidae, Carduelinae.	
Vangulifer neophasis	Valid	Sp. nov.	Helen F. James Storrs L. Olson	Holocene	Maui	USA (Hawaii)	A Fringillidae, Carduelinae.	
Xestospiza conica	Valid	Gen. nov. et Sp. nov.	Helen F. James Storrs L. Olson	Holocene	Kauai	USA (Hawaii)	A Fringillidae, Carduelinae.	
Xestospiza fastigialis	Valid	Gen. nov. et Sp. nov.	Helen F. James Storrs L. Olson	Holocene	Oahu, Molokai, Maui	USA (Hawaii)	A Fringillidae, Carduelinae, the type species of the new genus.	

==== Genera no longer considered to be birds ====
- Protoavis. The avian status of Protoavis has since been almost universally rejected by paleontologists.

== Pseudosuchians ==
Name	Novelty	Status	Authors	Age	Type locality	Country	Notes	Images
Australosuchus clarkae	Gen. et sp. nov	Valid	Willis & Molnar	Late Oligocene - Early Miocene	Etadunna Formation	Australia	A mekosuchine crocodilian described from a multitude of skeletons.	

== Pterosaurs ==
=== New taxa ===
Name	Status	Authors	Location	Images
Bennettazhia	Valid	Nesov	USA (Oregon)	

== Synapsids ==
=== Non-mammalian ===
Name	Status	Authors	Age	Unit	Location	Notes	Images
Apsisaurus	Valid	Laurin	Lower Permian	Archer City Formation	USA (Texas)	Formerly assigned as an eosuchian diapsid, was restudied and classified as a varanopid synapsid.	Apsisaurus
Ctenorhachis	Valid	Hook; Hotton	Upper Permian		USA (Texas)	A sphenacodontid synapsid.	Ctenorhachis
