= Makauwahi Cave =

Cave in Hawaii

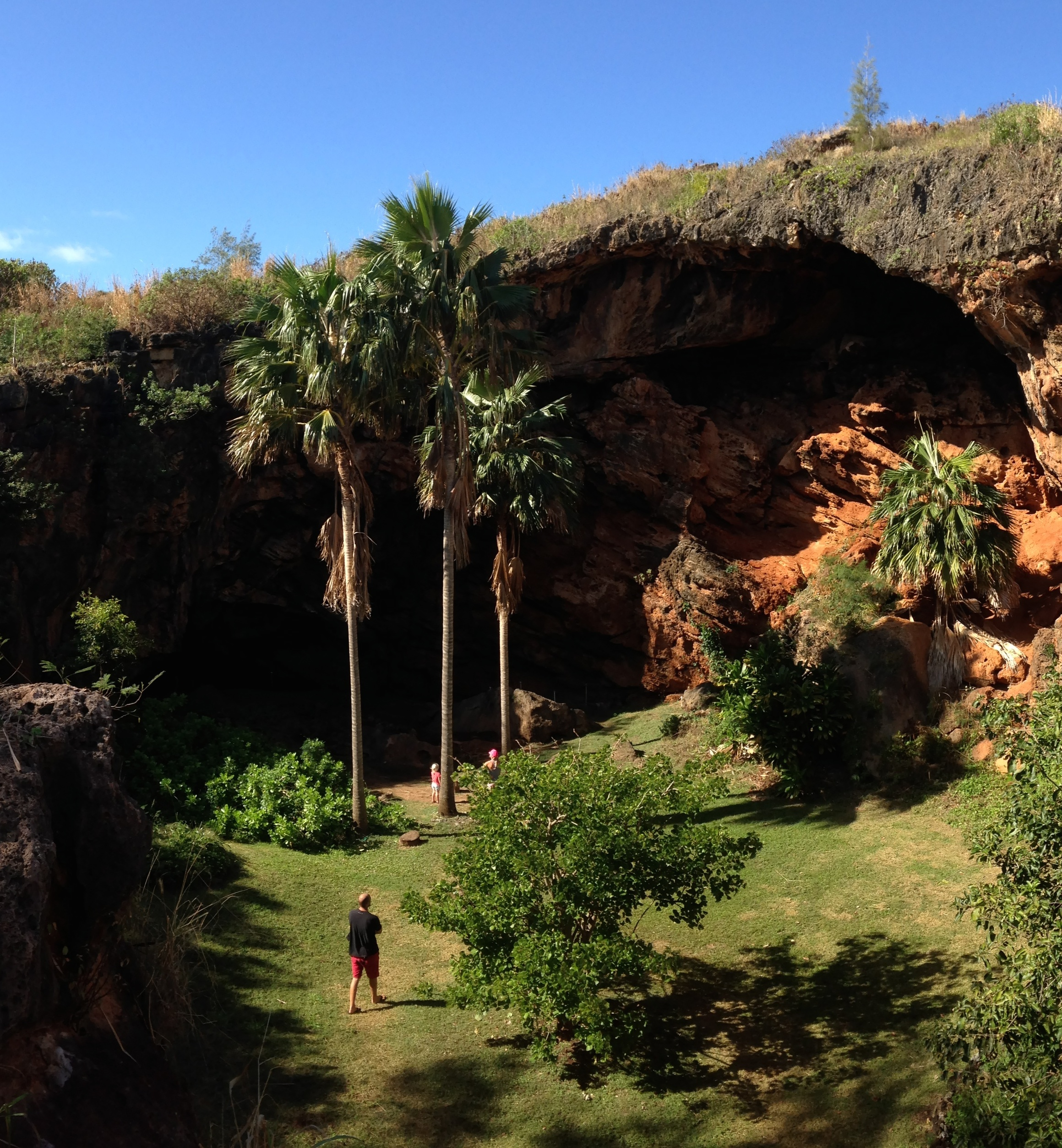
- Makauwahi Cave sinkhole, 2015

- Location in Hawaii
- 21°53′18″N 159°25′8″W
- Location: South coast of Kauaʻi island, Māhāʻulepū Valley
- Region: Hawaii

The Makauwahi Cave is the largest limestone cave found in Hawaii. It lies on the south coast of the island of Kauaʻi, in the Māhāʻulepū Valley close to Māhāʻulepū Beach, and is important for its paleoecological and archaeological values. It is reached via a sinkhole and has been described as “…maybe the richest fossil site in the Hawaiian Islands, perhaps in the entire Pacific Island region”.

== History ==
Though known historically by the inhabitants of the island, and used as a grave site by ancient Hawaiians, the cave’s paleontological value was first realized in 1992 by David Burney, Lida Pigott Burney, Helen F. James, and Storrs L. Olson, who found the cave’s access sinkhole while searching for fossil sites on the south coast of Kauaʻi. The traditional name of the cave, Makauwahi, or “smoke eye” in Hawaiian, was rediscovered in 2000 by local archaeologist William Pila Kikuchi, who found the name in a high school student’s essay written over a century previously.

In 2004 the Burneys acquired a lease on the cave property, now the Makauwahi Cave Reserve, spanning 17 ha (42.0 acres). The land is subject to environmental restoration after having been used for sugarcane and maize farming before being abandoned to weeds. The area was previously being planted with threatened native plants, such as the local Pritchardia palm.

In 2024 it was announced that due a lack of funding Makauwahi Cave would close to the public and ownership would be passed to Grove Farm, a Kauaʻi-based land-development company. Since this announcement, three of the reserve's seventeen Sulcata tortoises used to keep back encroaching invasive plants have been reported missing.

== Description ==
The site is apparently geologically unique in the Hawaiian Islands, comprising a sinkhole paleolake in a cave formed in eolianite limestone. The paleolake contains nearly 10,000 years of sedimentary record; since the discovery of Makauwahi as a fossil site, excavations have found pollen, seeds, diatoms, invertebrate shells, and Polynesian artifacts, as well as thousands of bird and fish bones.

The findings document not only the conditions before human colonization of the Hawaiian Islands, but also the millennium of human occupation with the drastic ecological changes that occurred since first Polynesians, and later Europeans and Asians, arrived to the islands and introduced a suite of invasive species such as feral pigs, feral dogs, feral cats, Norway rats, Asian tiger mosquitos, and the Indian mongoose. The reserve reveals the existence of a large number of native birds that became extinct as a result. The cave has also shown that certain plants previously believed to be Polynesian introductions, such as kou (Cordia subcordata) and hala (Pandanus tectorius), existed on the islands prior to human settlement.

Illustration of the turtle-jawed moa-nalo (Chelychelynechen quassus), an extinct species of goose-like duck with fossil remains found in the Makauwahi Cave.

Remains of some 40 species of birds have been found in the cave; half of these species are now extinct. New discoveries of extinct species include giant flightless species of the group Anatidae (ducks and geese), such as the turtle-jawed moa-nalo (Chelychelynechen quassus) and the Kauaʻi mole duck (Talpanas lippa). Other extinct birds found in the reserve include the Kauaʻi palila (Loxioides kikuichi), the Kauaʻi o`o (Moho braccatus) the Kauaʻi Stilt-owl (Grallistrix auceps) the Wahi grosbeak (Chloridops wahi), and the Hoopoe-billed ʻakialoa (Akialoa upupirostris) Other extinct species with remains found in the reserve include the beetle Blackburnia burneyi and several species of Carelia snails. The remains of the locally extinct laysan teal and Hawaiian hawk have also been recovered.

The Kauaʻi cave wolf spider and the Kauaʻi cave amphipod are only known to occur in the caves of Kauaʻi and a few lava tubes in the area. Also in the park outside of the cave is an enclosure for seventeen Sulcata tortoises from Africa used to control introduced invasive species of weeds introduced by humans to the island, such as Paederia foetida, Paspalum conjugatum, Mimosa pudica, and Megathyrsus maximus. These tortoises function as a Pleistocene rewilding substitute for the extinct giant flightless ducks and geese that used to live in the area. Several endangered species of birds are returning to certain areas the park, such as the black-crowned night heron subspecies N.n. hoactil, Hawaiian duck, Hawaiian gallinule, Hawaiian stilt, Hawaiian coot, and the Hawaiian goose, also called the nēnē. Native plants such as the Melanthera micrantha, Sesbania tomentosa, Hibiscus clayi, Scaevola taccada, Capparis sandwichiana, and Eragrostis variabilis are also repopulating the area. Native trees such as Kokia kauaiensis, and several Kauaʻi-native Pritchardia trees have been replanted in areas where they once grew. The Makauwahi Cave Reserve also has a habitat for shorebirds such as the migratory Pacific golden plover, the wandering tattler, and the ruddy turnstone subspecies A.i. interpres. There is also a coastal beach habitat for Hawaiian monk seals and green sea turtles, as well as seabirds such as the endangered Hawaiian petrel, the Newell's shearwater, and the great frigatebird subspecies F.m. palmerstoni.

== See also ==
- Ancient Hawaii
- List of sinkholes of the United States
- Paleoecology
