= Talpanas =

Kaua'i mole duck Temporal range: Holocene 4050 BCE (Holocene)

Scientific classification
- Kingdom: Animalia
- Phylum: Chordata
- Class: Aves
- Order: Anseriformes
- Family: Anatidae
- Genus: †Talpanas; Olson & James, 2009
- Species: †T. lippa

Binomial name
- †Talpanas lippa Olson & James, 2009

Extinct genus of birds

Talpanas lippa, the Kauaʻi mole duck, is an extinct species of duck. It was first described by Andrew N. Iwaniuk, Storrs L. Olson, and Helen F. James in the journal Zootaxa in November 2009. It is the only known member of the genus Talpanas. It was endemic to the Hawaiian island of Kauaʻi where the fossil remains were unearthed in the Makauwahi Cave, Maha‘ulepu. The archaeological association of the bones is about 6000 years BP (around 4050 BCE).

== Etymology ==
The genus name Talpanas is taken from the Latin word talpa, meaning mole and referring to the small size of the eyes, and the Greek word anas, or duck. The species name lippa is from the Latin lippus, meaning "nearly blind".

== Description ==
The tarsometatarsi (lower leg bones) of Talpanas lippa were short and stout, and the braincase shallow and wide relative to its length. It had very small orbits (eye sockets) and also very small optic foramina (holes in the skull through which the optic nerves pass as they travel from the eyes to the brain). Together, these physical characteristics show that the eyes and optic nerve of this duck were quite reduced in size, and it can be assumed that this species was probably both blind and flightless. However, the maxillo-mandibular foramina (holes through which the trigeminal nerve passes) are extremely large, indicating larger nerves were travelling through it. The authors hypothesize that this blind, or nearly blind, duck would have used tactile and olfactory stimuli (the senses of touch and smell) from its beak to explore its surroundings in the absence of good vision.

The holotype, a partial skull, is stored at the Smithsonian Institution with specimen number USNM 535683.
