= Wood harrier =

Wood harrier Temporal range: Late Holocene

Scientific classification
- Kingdom: Animalia
- Phylum: Chordata
- Class: Aves
- Order: Accipitriformes
- Family: Accipitridae
- Genus: Circus
- Species: †C. dossenus

Binomial name
- †Circus dossenus Olson & James 1991

Extinct species of bird

The wood harrier or mime harrier (Circus dossenus) is an extinct bird of prey which lived in Hawaii during the Holocene. This small, short-winged harrier inhabited the forests of Molokai and Oahu where it presumably hunted for small birds and insects.

== Description ==
When compared to extant species of the genus Circus, the wood harrier was a small harrier. It had rather short wings but long legs and was even outsized by the small pied harrier and Montagu's harrier.

== Habitat ==
The habitat of the wood harrier consisted of forests, where it hunted for insects or small birds such as honeycreepers, since there were no terrestrial mammals before the arrival of the Polynesians in Hawaii. Due to its habitat which is unusual for harriers and because of its small prey, it developed shorter wings and a smaller body (rather resembling an Accipiter or the stilt owls Grallistrix), making it a typical example of insular dwarfism.

== Distribution ==
The wood harrier was presumably restricted to the islands of Oahu and Molokai, since there are no records from other Hawaiian islands. It probably became extinct due to habitat degradation and the introduction of the Pacific rat by early Polynesians. Since the wood harrier was most likely a ground breeder, it might have been affected severely by the colonization of Hawaii.

== Discovery and taxonomy ==
In 1981, Helen F. James and her husband Storrs L. Olson first discovered remains of a bird they believed to be an Accipiter because of its proportions. This misidentification was also due to the poor material, consisting only of a few bones. They finally rejected their identification in 1991 after they had examined several other subfossil records of the bird and finally placed it in the genus Circus. They named it dossenus, explaining the name as follows: “Latin, dossenus, a clown or jester, without which one cannot have a circus; especially applicable here because the species initially fooled us as to its generic placement.” They noted that the wide global extension of Circus would support this placement and added that there had been sightings of northern harriers in Hawaii so that the evolution of a Hawaiian species of harrier would indeed seem plausible.

== Bibliography ==
- Storrs L. Olson, Helen F. James: Descriptions of thirty-two new Species of Birds from the Hawaiian Islands. In: Ornithological Monographs 45, pp. 65–85, 1991. ISBN 0-935868-54-2
