= Ornimegalonyx =

Cuban giant owl Temporal range: Late Pleistocene

Scientific classification
- Kingdom: Animalia
- Phylum: Chordata
- Class: Aves
- Order: Strigiformes
- Family: Strigidae
- Genus: †Ornimegalonyx; Arredondo, 1954

Species
- †O. oteroi Arredondo, 1954 (type); †O. ewingi Suarez, 2020

Extinct genus of owl

The Cuban giant owl or cursorial giant owl (Ornimegalonyx) is an extinct genus of giant owl that measured 1.1 metres (3 ft 7 in) in height. It is closely related to the many species of living owls of the genus Strix. It was a flightless or nearly flightless bird and it is believed to be the largest owl that ever existed. It lived on the island of Cuba.

The first fossil specimen was mistakenly described as a bird in the family Phorusrhacidae, in part because the bones were so large. In 1961, Pierce Brodkorb reviewed the findings and identified them to have belonged to an owl. Remains have been found in cave deposits from the Late Pleistocene period (126,000 to 11,700 years ago).

== Taxonomy ==
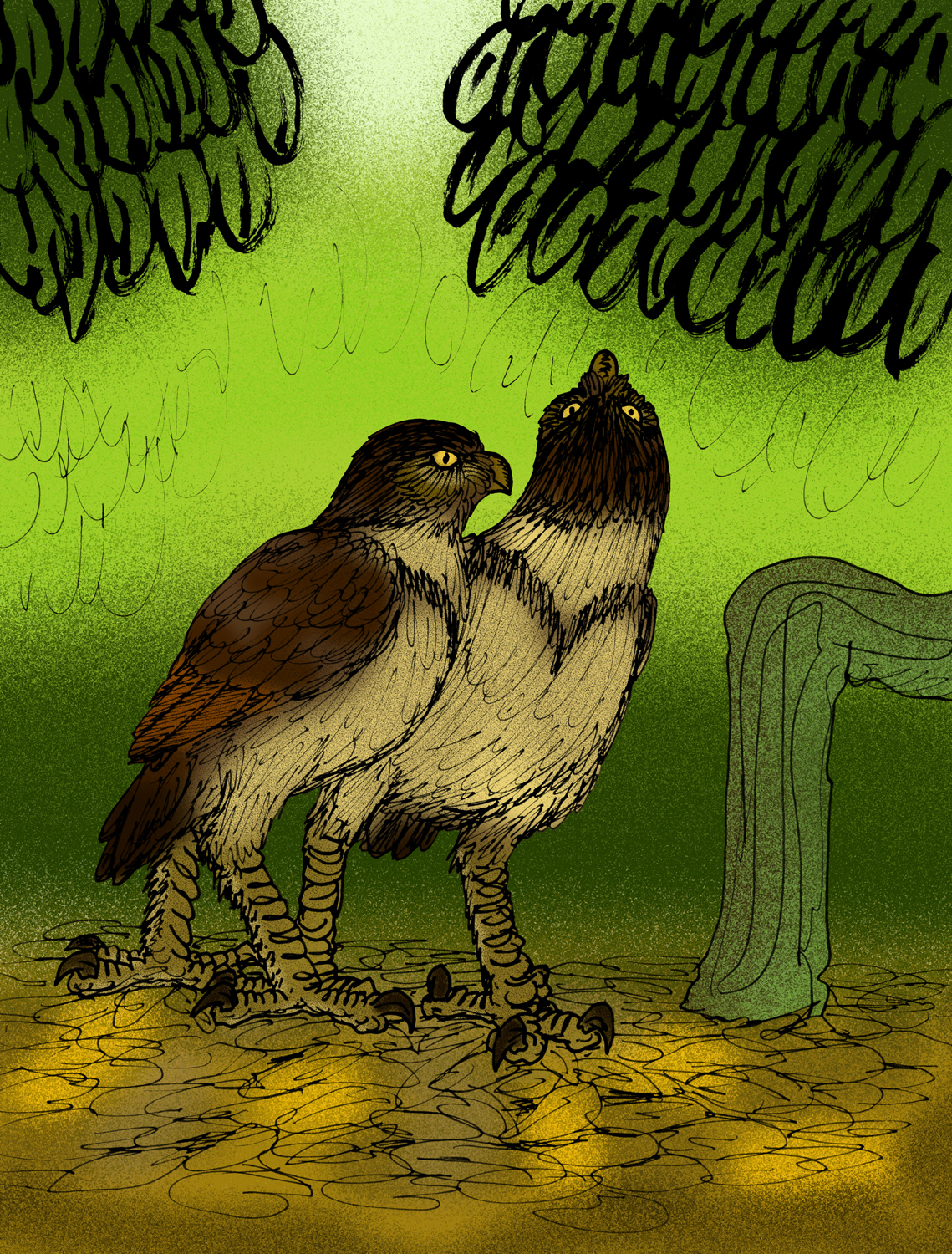
Life Restoration

In the past, three additional species of Ornimegalonyx besides O. oteroi were regarded as valid. All were described in 1982 and include:

- Ornimegalonyx minor Arredondo, 1982
- Ornimegalonyx gigas Arredondo, 1982
- Ornimegalonyx acevedoi Arredondo, 1982

A 2020 study concluded that those species are all synonyms of O. oteroi, and describe a new valid species, Ornimegalonyx ewingi, from material formerly assigned to the prehistoric horned owl Bubo osvaldoi.

"Ornimegalonyx arredondoi" is a nomen nudum; the name was proposed for this species before it was described but oteroi was eventually adopted by Oscar Arredondo (according to the rules of the ICZN, naming a species after oneself is not prohibited, but it is frowned upon as vain by the scientific community).

== Description ==
Size of Ornimegalonyx compared to a human.

Arredondo estimated the height of Ornimegalonyx to have been 1.1 m (3 ft 7 in) tall. It had very long legs for its size, but was bulky overall and probably short-tailed. Its body mass in life is initially estimated to have been approximately 30 kg (66 lb), but later studies suggest a mass of 9 to 13.5 kg (20 to 30 lb). The modern owl that most resembles the Cuban giant owl in proportions is probably the dainty and quite small burrowing owl, the only surviving owl closely tied to the ground. This implies similar adaptations to the terrestrial lifestyle, but not a close phylogenetic relationship.

The legs and feet of the Cuban giant owl appear to be very large and powerfully built. This supports the theory that they were strong runners, hence the alternate name, cursorial. The keel of the sternum was reduced and the owl may have been capable of short burst of flight. It is probable that, like a modern wild turkey, the owl only took flight when extremely pressed, more often choosing to run. The females of this owl species were larger than the males.

== Diet ==
The Cuban giant owl is believed to have preyed principally on large hutias, including Capromys, Geocapromys, and Macrocapromys (the latter being the size of a modern nutria or capybara) and the ground sloths Cubanocnus, Miocnus, Mesocnus, and Megalocnus, some of these sloths being roughly the size of an American black bear. It possibly fed on the Cuban flightless crane, Antigone cubensis. It was probably an ambush predator that would pounce on unsuspecting prey with its crushing talons.

== See also ==
- Tyto pollens
- Tyto gigantea
- Tyto robusta
- Grallistrix
- Chickcharney
- Late Quaternary prehistoric birds
- List of extinct birds
- List of fossil birds
- List of extinct animals
- Flightless birds
