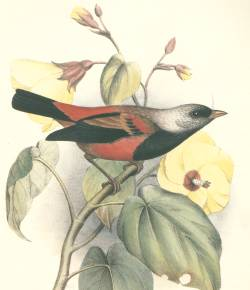
- ʻUla-ʻai-hawane

Scientific classification
- Kingdom: Animalia
- Phylum: Chordata
- Class: Aves
- Order: Passeriformes
- Family: Fringillidae
- Subfamily: Carduelinae
- Genus: †Ciridops; A. Newton, 1892

Species
- Ciridops anna Ciridops tenax

= Ciridops =

Ciridops Temporal range: Holocene

Extinct genus of birds

Ciridops is an extinct genus of Hawaiian honeycreeper species that occurred in prehistoric and historic times on the Hawaiian islands of Hawaii, Molokai, Kauai and Oahu. This genus was created in 1892 by Alfred Newton in an article published by the journal Nature on the basis of the ʻula-ʻai-hawane, which was named Fringilla anna by Sanford B. Dole in 1879.

The bill of these birds was strong. The culmen was arched, and the maxilla overlapped the mandible at the base. The nostrils were covered by a membrane. The wings were large and the tail was moderate with pointed rectrices. The nearest relatives might have been from the genus Loxops.

The ʻula-ʻai-hawane, which was last seen in 1892, is the only species that survived into historic times, three others Ciridops cf. anna from Molokai, Ciridops sp. from Oahu, and the stout-legged finch (Ciridops tenax) from Kauai are only known from subfossil remains found in late quaternary deposits.

== Species ==
Image	Common name	Scientific name
	†ʻUla-ʻai-hawane	†Ciridops anna (Dole, 1879)
	†Stout-legged finch	†Ciridops tenax Olson & James, 1991
		†Ciridops cf. anna (on Molokai) Olson & James, 1991
		†Ciridops sp. (on Oahu) Olson & James, 1991
