= Oʻahu petrel =

Oʻahu petrel Temporal range: Early Holocene

Scientific classification
- Kingdom: Animalia
- Phylum: Chordata
- Class: Aves
- Order: Procellariiformes
- Family: Procellariidae
- Genus: Pterodroma
- Species: P. jugabilis

Binomial name
- Pterodroma jugabilis Olson & James, 1991

Extinct species of bird

The Oʻahu petrel (Pterodroma jugabilis) is an extinct species of very small gadfly petrel known only from subfossil material found in the Hawaiian Islands. The specific epithet comes from the Latin jugabilis, meaning “that which may be joined”, with reference to the unusual, nearly conjoined, supraorbital salt gland depressions on the cranium. It has no obvious close relatives among living species of Pterodroma.

The petrel's remains have been recovered from Barbers Point, Oʻahu, and from lava tubes in the North Kona District of Hawaiʻi. It probably bred at other sites in the Hawaiian Islands, and possibly elsewhere in the Pacific. Most bones were found in an archaeological context, indicating that the birds had been used as food by ancient Hawaiians.
