= Zusi =

Zusi may refer to:

- Zushi, Kanagawa, a city in Japan
- Graham Zusi (born 1986), American footballer
- Richard L. Zusi (born 1930), American ornithologist
