= Wahi grosbeak =

Wahi grosbeak Temporal range: Early Holocene

Scientific classification
- Kingdom: Animalia
- Phylum: Chordata
- Class: Aves
- Order: Passeriformes
- Family: Fringillidae
- Subfamily: Carduelinae
- Genus: †Chloridops
- Species: †C. wahi

Binomial name
- †Chloridops wahi James and Olson 1991

Extinct species of bird

The wahi grosbeak or Oʻahu grosbeak (Chloridops wahi) is a prehistoric species of Hawaiian honeycreeper. The wahi grosbeak was endemic to dry forests on the Hawaiian islands of Kauaʻi, Oʻahu, and Maui. Based on the thickness of its bill it fed on seeds easier to crack than those of the naio (Myoporum sandwicense), on which the Kona grosbeak fed. The species was already extinct when Europeans landed on the island. Being only known from fossils, its behavior and the exact reasons for its extinction are essentially unknown. Its fossils have been found throughout the islands, but were present in higher concentrations in caves. The bird was smaller than the related King Kong grosbeak (C. regiskongi) by 2 inches (5.1 cm). It had a total length of 9 inches (23 cm).
