= Bubo osvaldoi =

Bubo osvaldoi Temporal range: Pleistocene

Scientific classification
- Kingdom: Animalia
- Phylum: Chordata
- Class: Aves
- Order: Strigiformes
- Family: Strigidae
- Genus: Bubo
- Species: B. osvaldoi

Binomial name
- Bubo osvaldoi Arredondo & Olson, 1994

Extinct species of bird

Bubo osvaldoi, also known as the Cuban horned owl, is an extinct species of horned owl from the Pleistocene of Cuba.

It was described by Oscar Arredondo and Storrs L. Olson in 1994 from three bones found in a cave in the Guaniguanico mountain range in Pinar del Río. Analysis of these bones indicates that the species was larger than any current owl.
