= Stout-legged finch =

Stout-legged finch Temporal range: Early Holocene

Scientific classification
- Kingdom: Animalia
- Phylum: Chordata
- Class: Aves
- Order: Passeriformes
- Family: Fringillidae
- Subfamily: Carduelinae
- Genus: †Ciridops
- Species: †C. tenax

Binomial name
- †Ciridops tenax (Olson & James, 1991)

Extinct species of bird

The stout-legged finch (Ciridops tenax) is an extinct species of finch, in the 'Hawaiian honeycreeper' group. Subfossil remains have been found only on the island of Kauai and indicate that it survived up until the late Quaternary period. It probably died out when the first humans arrived in the Hawaiian Islands. The stout-legged finch would have been very vulnerable to the pests and agriculture that the humans brought with them. It was a congener of the 'ula-'ai-hawane, and therefore probably had similar colors of red, white and black.
