= King Kong grosbeak =

King Kong grosbeak Temporal range: Early Holocene

Scientific classification
- Kingdom: Animalia
- Phylum: Chordata
- Class: Aves
- Order: Passeriformes
- Family: Fringillidae
- Subfamily: Carduelinae
- Genus: †Chloridops
- Species: †C. regiskongi

Binomial name
- †Chloridops regiskongi James & Olson, 1991

Extinct species of bird

The King Kong grosbeak or giant grosbeak (Chloridops regiskongi) is a prehistoric species of Hawaiian honeycreeper, that was endemic to Hawaiʻi. It had the largest beak of the three Chloridops species known to have existed. The King Kong grosbeak was described from fossils found at Barber's Point and Ulupau Head on the island of Oʻahu. It was 11 inches (28 cm) long, making it one of the largest Hawaiian honeycreepers. The osteology of the mandible strongly suggests that C. regiskongi was a sister-taxon of Rhodacanthis.

The unusual name given to the species came from a reporter's misquoting of ornithologist Storrs L. Olson’s discovery of the then-unnamed species as being "a giant, gargantuan, King Kong finch."
