= Māhāʻulepū Beach =

Beach in Kauai County, Hawaii

Coordinates: 21°53′33″N 159°25′01″W

Māhāʻulepū Beach is a beach on the southeast coast of the Hawaiian island of Kauai. It is two miles (3.2 km) long and goes from Punahoa point to Paʻoʻo point. The beach is separated into three different parts: Gillin's Beach, Kawailoa Bay, and Hāʻula Beach. Gillin's Beach, the center section, is known for petroglyphs that are carved into the rocks, though they are rarely exposed. Fossils of extinct birds have been found in sand dunes along the shoreline, including the Kauaʻi Stilt-owl (Grallistrix auceps), a flightless rail, and three species of goose. Close to the beach is the paleontologically important Makauwahi Cave.

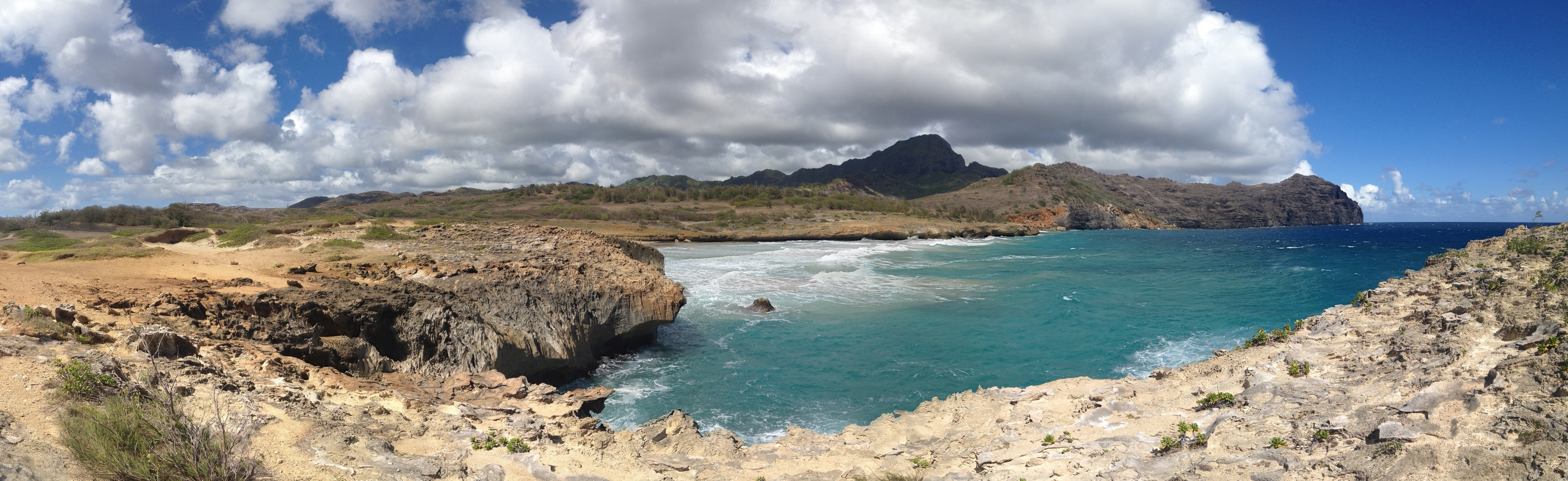
A panoramic view of Haula beach, the most eastern beach in Mahaulepu.
