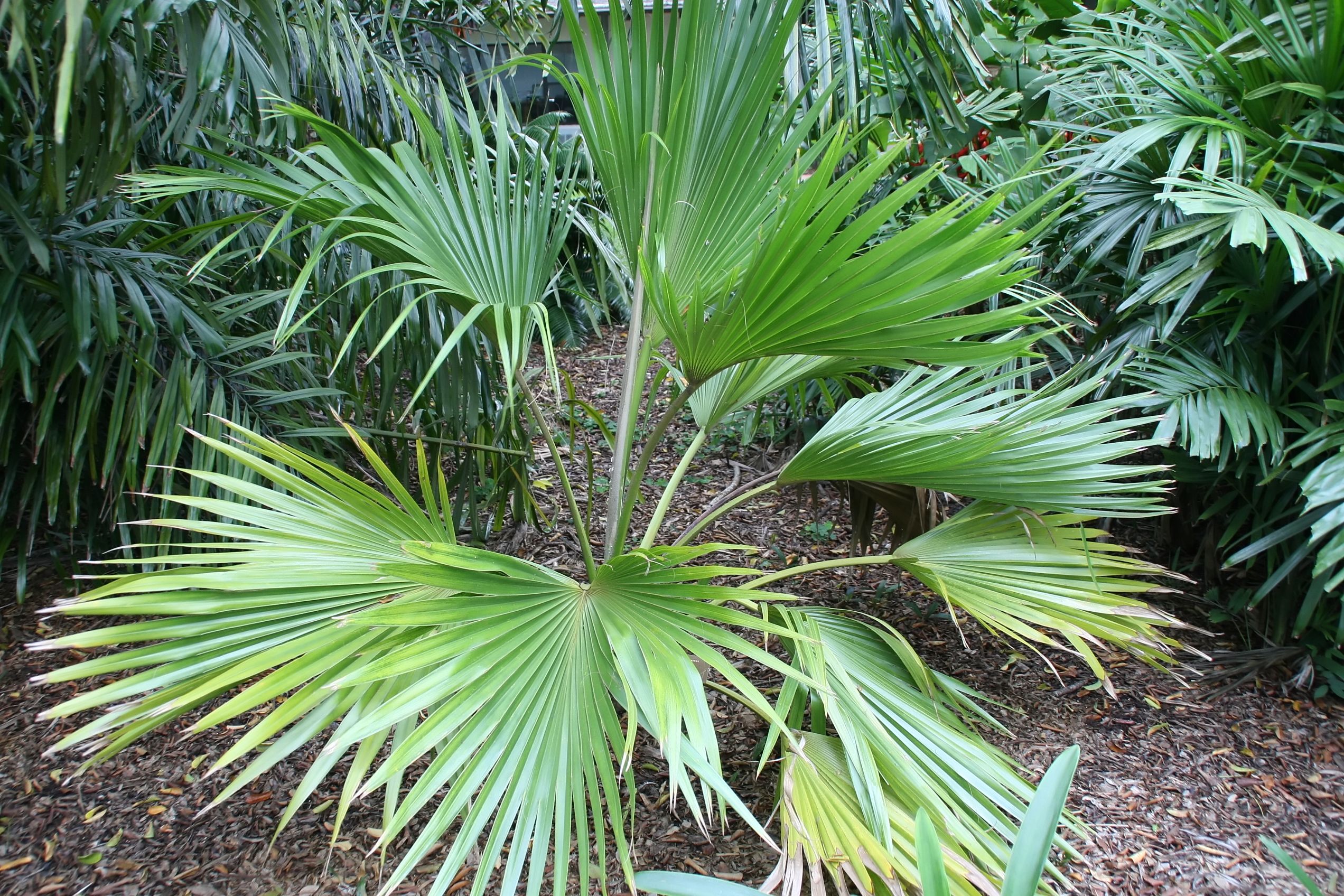

Conservation status
- Critically Endangered (IUCN 2.3)

- Possibly Extinct (NatureServe)

Scientific classification
- Kingdom: Plantae
- Clade: Tracheophytes
- Clade: Angiosperms
- Clade: Monocots
- Clade: Commelinids
- Order: Arecales
- Family: Arecaceae
- Genus: Pritchardia
- Species: P. affinis

Binomial name
- Pritchardia affinis Becc.

= Pritchardia affinis =

Species of palm

Pritchardia affinis, the Hawaiʻi pritchardia, is a species of palm tree that is endemic to the Hawaiian Islands. Wild populations currently exist on the leeward side of the Island of Hawaiʻi. It was most likely cultivated by Native Hawaiians, its exact native range is uncertain. P. affinis reaches a height of 10–25 m (33–82 ft). It is threatened by pests such as rats and pigs, which damage trees and eat the seeds before they can grow. It is a federally listed endangered species of the United States. The fruit of Pritchardia affinis was reportedly the preferred food of the now-extinct ula-ai-hawane—a niche that has been seemingly filled by the introduced lavender waxbill.

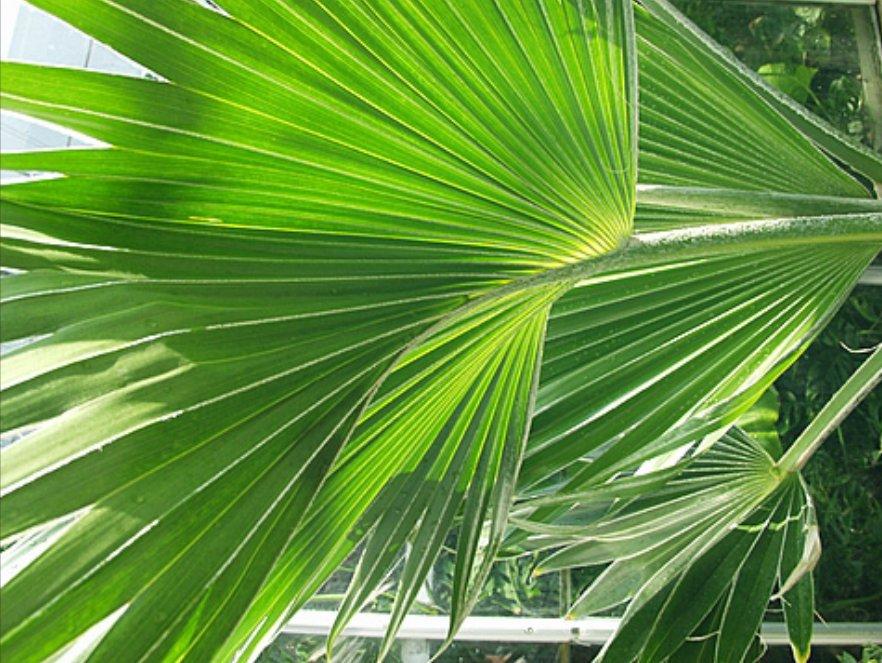
Sample shown in the US Botanic Garden.
