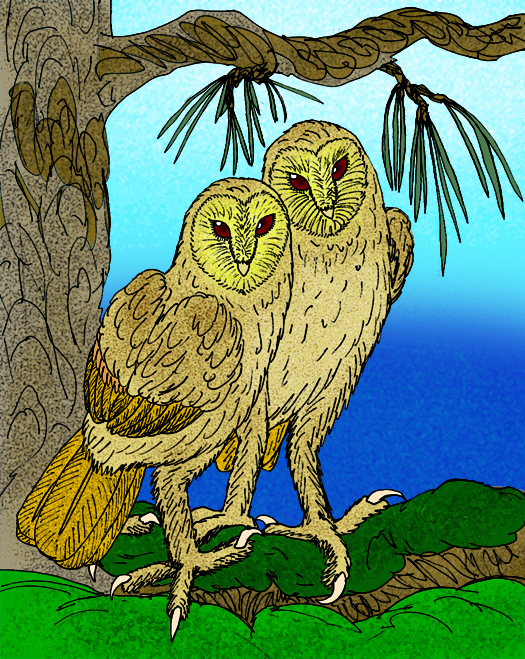

Scientific classification
- Kingdom: Animalia
- Phylum: Chordata
- Class: Aves
- Order: Strigiformes
- Family: Tytonidae
- Genus: Tyto
- Species: †T. pollens

Binomial name
- †Tyto pollens Wetmore, 1937

= Tyto pollens =

Tyto pollens Temporal range: Late Pleistocene

Extinct species of bird

Tyto pollens is an extinct giant owl which lived in the Bahamas during the last Ice Age.

== Description ==
It is only known from the partial remains of three individuals which have been collected on the islands of Little Exuma (the site was misidentified as on Great Exuma in the original literature) and New Providence. Alexander Wetmore initially described the species from fossils of a single individual from Little Exuma site which are the holotype: a complete coracoid, a proximal end of the ulna, a major metacarpal lacking the proximal end and the complete femur. The femur is 81.2mm in length. Both palaeontological sites are from before the arrival of humans (the Lucayans) to the islands. 18,000 years ago, the sea level was 120 metres lower than today and the Bahamas existed as at least five major islands, with a land mass over 10 times the modern size. Both dig sites would have been part of the same island. The fossil assembly of the period indicates that the Bahamas were much drier and more arid in this period, and instead of the pine forests covering the islands today, it was covered by an extensive savannah or prairie.

== Ecology ==
The species was sympatric with the American barn owl (Tyto furcata), which was much more common on the Bahamas at the time than it is today, and also had a radically different diet than today, having shifted from a diet of primarily brown anoles (Anolis sagrei) to primarily rats and house mice today. The New Providence site contained only two partial skeletons, but also copious amounts of owl pellets. These show that T. pollens had a diet which was largely based on the large rodent Geocapromys ingrahami, which at present only survives on a single small arid island, but which appears to have once been the only land mammal of the Bahamas and extremely common throughout most of the islands at the time. It is thought that the changing wetter climate allowed a new habitat of Bahamian pineyards (Caribbean pine forests) to spread over the islands, which drove this main prey of T. pollens to be extirpated from all but remnant arid habitat islands, and hunting by the Lucayans may have possibly also driven the species to extinction. The Little Exuma site is from a layer not far under a darker, more organic layer showing the arrival of the Lucayans, but it was never properly dated. The New Providence site is from some 20,000 years ago, give or take. T. pollens was closely related to T. ostologa from Hispaniola and T. noeli from Cuba. T. noeli was sympatric with an even larger species of barn owl, T. riveroi.

== Distribution and habitat ==
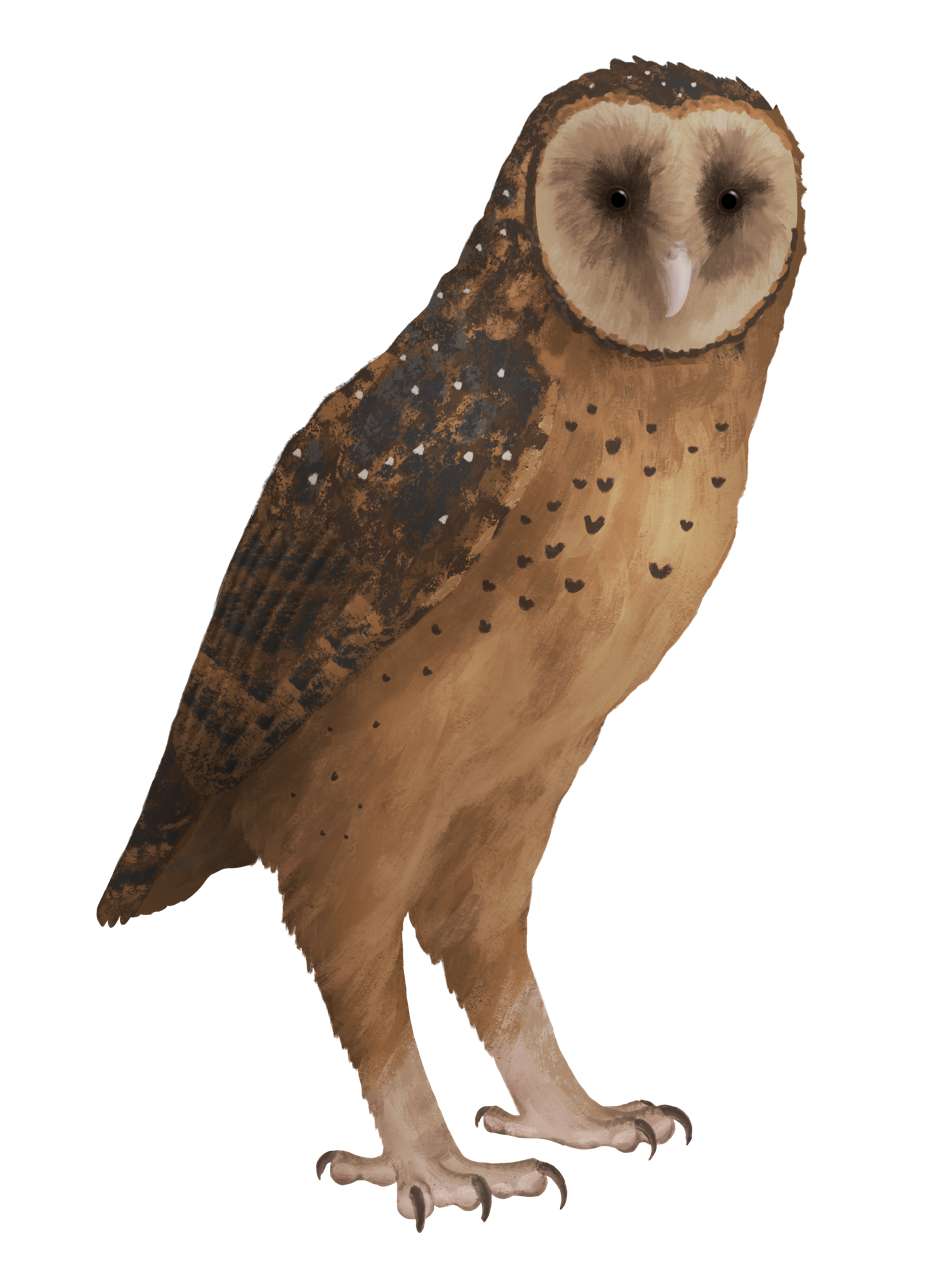
An illustration of Tyto pollens

In a 1995 report Bruce G. Marcot, a forester from the Pacific Northwest Research Station in Portland, Oregon, claimed without evidence that it lived in the old-growth Bahamian pineyards of Andros Island in the Bahamas, although the fossil assemblage indicates it was a species from the prairies and no fossils are known from Andros Island. Marcot claimed that the owl became recently extinct due to "early human settlers". He invented a new common name for the taxon: the Andros Island barn owl. He also claimed it was flightless and 1 meter tall, although it was certainly not flightless nor so large. One estimate posited the body mass of T. pollens as perhaps 9.1 kg (20 lb).

== The chickcharney ==
Bruce G. Marcot claimed that T. pollens likely inspired the legend of the chickcharney, a mischievous owl-like goblin from Bahamian folklore. Paleontologist Lisa G. Buckley claimed that this theory was likely true, stating that T. pollens had a geographical and temporal overlap with the origin of the chickcharney myth.

== See also ==
- Grallistrix
- Ornimegalonyx
- Late Quaternary prehistoric birds
- List of fossil birds
