= Bradley C. Livezey =

American ornithologist

Bradley Curtis Livezey (June 15, 1954 – February 8, 2011) was an American ornithologist. His main research included the evolution of flightless birds, the systematics of birds, and the ecology and behaviour of steamer ducks.

== Early life ==
Livezey was born in Salem, Massachusetts. He grew up in Massachusetts, Pennsylvania, and Illinois. His interest in birds started when he was in High School. Livezey earned a Bachelor of Science at Oregon State University in 1976. In 1979 he earned his first Master of Science degree at the University of Wisconsin–Madison in wildlife ecology and in 1984 his second in mathematics at the University of Kansas. In 1985 he completed a PhD with his thesis Systematics and flightlessness of steamer-ducks (Anatidae: Tachyeres) at the University of Kansas. In 1993, he was hired as Associate Curator of Birds at Carnegie Museum of Natural History in Pittsburgh and was awarded full curatorship in 2001. During that time, he served as the museum's first Dean of Science. As Curator of Birds, he oversaw around 195,000 bird specimens, the ninth-largest bird collection in the United States.

== Research ==
Livezey's research work dealt with controversial areas of bird phylogenetics and taxonomy. While Livezey's colleagues often used DNA analysis to support their research, Livezey demonstrated a more traditional approach, based on exhaustive studies of bone shape and other characteristics. His general interests included phylogenetic relationships of avian families, phylogenetic relationships of waterfowl, evolution of avian flightlessness, comparative osteology of birds, multivariate morphometrics, and avian paleontology. He was generally considered to be the world authority on the osteology—the study of skeletons—of birds. Perhaps his greatest legacy is the Higher-Order Phylogeny of Modern Birds, co-authored over the course of 10 years with associate Richard L. Zusi of the Smithsonian Institution. This research opus analyzes 2,954 bird characters—traits such as beak shape, relative wing proportions, and feather characteristics—to create the most comprehensive bird classification scheme known to science. Brad was also one of the first researchers to embrace the concept that birds shared their evolutionary lineage with dinosaurs.

On February 8, 2011 Livezey died in a two-car collision caused by icy road conditions on the Pennsylvania Route 910 near his home in Wexford, Pennsylvania.

== Selected works ==
- 1992: Taxonomy and identification of steamer-ducks (Anatidae : Tachyeres). Museum of Natural History, University of Kansas
- 2003: Evolution of Flightlessness in Rails (Gruiformes: Rallidae): Phylogenetic, Ecomorphological, and Ontogenetic Perspectives. Ornithological Monographs No. 53: 1–654.
- 1986a. A phylogenetic analysis of Recent anseriform genera using morphological characters. Auk 103: 737–754.
- 1986b. Flightlessness in steamer-ducks (Anatidae: Tachyeres): its morphological bases and probable evolution (with PH Humphrey). Evolution 40: 540–558.
- 1988a. Morphometrics of flightlessness in the Alcidae. Auk 105: 681–698.
- 1988b. The systematic position of the Miocene anatid Anas[?] blanchardi Milne-Edwards (with LD Martin). Journal of Vertebrate Paleontology 8: 196–211.
- 1989a. Morphometric patterns in Recent and fossil penguins (Aves, Sphenisciformes). Journal of Zoology (London) 219: 269–307.
- 1989b. Flightlessness in grebes (Aves, Podicipedidae): its independent evolution in three genera. Evolution 43: 29–54.
- 1989c. Phylogenetic relationships and incipient flightlessness of the extinct Auckland Islands merganser. Wilson Bulletin 101: 410–435.
- 1990. Evolutionary morphology of flightlessness in the Auckland Islands Teal. Condor 92: 639–673.
- 1991. A phylogenetic analysis and classification of Recent dabbling ducks (Tribe Anatini) based on comparative morphology. Auk 108: 471–508.
- 1992a. Morphological corollaries and ecological implications of flightlessness in the kakapo (Psittaciformes: Strigops habroptilus). Journal of Morphology 213: 105–145.
- 1992b. Flightlessness in the Galápagos cormorant (Compsohalieus [Nannopterum] harrisi): heterochrony, giantism, and specialization. Zoological Journal of the Linnean Society 105: 155–224.
- 1993. An ecomorphological review of the dodo (Raphus cucullatus) and solitaire (Pezophaps solitaria), flightless Columbiformes of the Mascarene Islands. Journal of Zoology (London) 230: 247–292.
- 1994. The carpometacarpus of Aptornis [sic]. Notornis 41: 51–60.
- 1995a. Heterochrony and the evolution of avian flightlessness. In: McNamara KJ, ed. Evolutionary change and heterochrony. Chichester, UK: J. Wiley, 169–193.
- 1995b. A phylogenetic analysis of the whistling and white-backed ducks (Anatidae: Dendrocygninae) using morphological characters. Annals of Carnegie Museum 64:65–97.
- 1995c. Phylogeny and evolutionary ecology of modern seaducks (Anatidae: Mergini). Condor 97: 233–255.
- 1995d. Phylogeny and comparative ecology of stiff-tailed Ducks (Anatidae: Oxyurini). Wilson Bulletin 107:214–234.
- 1996a. A phylogenetic analysis of the geese and swans (Anseriformes: Anserinae), including selected fossil species. Systematic Biology 45: 415–450.
- 1996b. A phylogenetic reassessment of the tadornine-anatine divergence (Aves: Anseriformes, Anatidae). Annals of Carnegie Museum 65: 27–88.
- 1996c. A phylogenetic analysis of modern pochards (Anatidae: Aythyini). Auk 113: 74–93.
- 1997a. A phylogenetic analysis of basal Anseriformes, the fossil Presbyornis, and the interordinal relationships of waterfowl. Zoological Journal of the Linnean Society 121: 361–428.
- 1997b. An annotated phylogenetic classification of waterfowl (Aves: Anseriformes), including selected fossil species. Annals of Carnegie Museum 67: 457–496.
- 1997c. A phylogenetic analysis of modern shelducks and sheldgeese (Anatidae, Tadornini). Ibis 139: 51–66.
- 1998a. Erratum – A phylogenetic analysis of basal Anseriformes, the fossil Presbyornis, and the interordinal relationships of waterfowl. Zoological Journal of the Linnean Society 124: 397–398.
- 1998b. A phylogenetic analysis of the Gruiformes (Aves) based on morphological characters, with an emphasis on the rails (Rallidae). Philosophical Transactions of the Royal Society (Series B) 353: 2077–2151.
- 2001. Higher-order phylogenetics of modern Aves based on comparative anatomy (with Richard Laurence Zusi). Netherlands Journal of Zoology 51: 179–206.
- 2003a. Avian spirit collections: attitudes, importance and prospects. Bulletin of the British Ornithologists' Club 123 (Suppl.): 35–51.
- 2003b. Evolution of flightlessness in rails (Gruiformes: Rallidae): phylogenetic, ecomorphological, and ontogenetic perspectives. Ornithological Monographs 53: 1–654.
- 2003c. Millennial status report as debate wanes [review]. Science 299: 1664–1665.
- 2007a: Higher-order phylogeny of modern birds (Theropoda, Aves: Neornithes) based on comparative anatomy. I. – Methods and characters. Bulletin of Carnegie Museum of Natural History 37: 1–556 (with Richard Laurence Zusi). Zoological Journal of the Linnean Society, 2007, 149: 1–95.
- 2007b: Higher-order phylogeny of modern birds (Theropoda, Aves: Neornithes) based on comparative anatomy. II. Analysis and discussion (with Richard Laurence Zusi). Zoological Journal of the Linnean Society, 2007, 149: 1–95.
