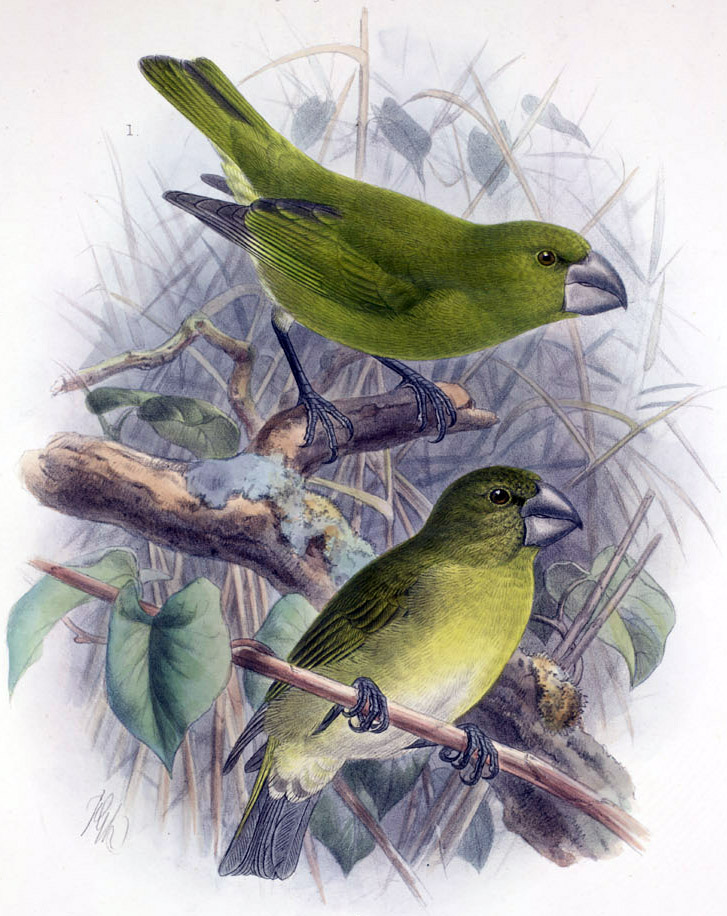
- Kona Grosbeak (Chloridops kona)

Scientific classification
- Kingdom: Animalia
- Phylum: Chordata
- Class: Aves
- Order: Passeriformes
- Family: Fringillidae
- Subfamily: Carduelinae
- Genus: †Chloridops; Wilson, 1888

Species
- See text

= Chloridops =

Chloridops Temporal range: Holocene

Extinct genus of birds

Chloridops is an extinct genus of Hawaiian honeycreeper in the subfamily Carduelinae of the family Fringillidae.

== Distribution ==
The birds were endemic to Hawaii. It comprised three species: two on the Big Island of Hawaii; and one that inhabited Kauai, Oahu, and Maui.

== Species ==
The genus includes the following three species:

- Kona grosbeak (Chloridops kona) — extinct (1894)
- Wahi grosbeak (Chloridops wahi) — prehistoric
- King Kong grosbeak (Chloridops regiskongi) — prehistoric

== See also ==
- Hawaiian honeycreepers
- Endemic fauna of Hawaii
- Extinct birds of Hawaii
