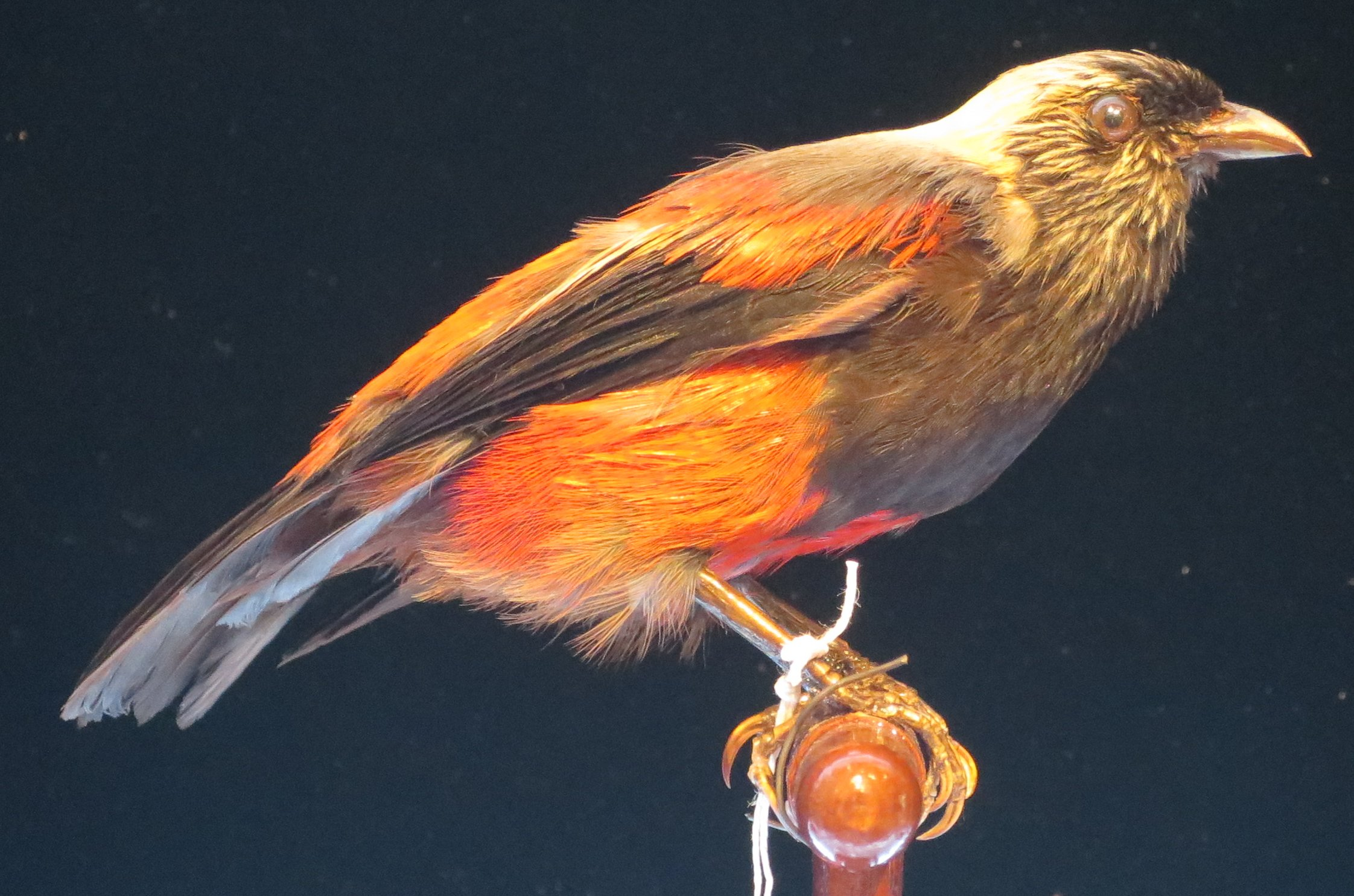
- Specimen in Bishop Museum, Honolulu

Conservation status
- Extinct (1892) (IUCN 3.1)

Scientific classification
- Kingdom: Animalia
- Phylum: Chordata
- Class: Aves
- Order: Passeriformes
- Family: Fringillidae
- Subfamily: Carduelinae
- Genus: †Ciridops
- Species: †C. anna

Binomial name
- †Ciridops anna (Dole, 1878)

= ʻUla-ʻai-hāwane =

Extinct species of bird

The ʻula-ʻai-hāwane (Ciridops anna) is an extinct species of small Hawaiian honeycreeper. The term ʻula-ʻai-hāwane is a Hawaiian phrase translating to "red [bird] that eats hāwane". It was only ever reported from the forested mountains of the Kohala, Hilo and Kona districts on the island of Hawaiʻi. Fossil remains reveal that it (and at least one closely related species, Ciridops tenax) also existed at one time on other Hawaiian islands. The species is named after Anna Dole, wife of Sanford B. Dole.

== Description ==
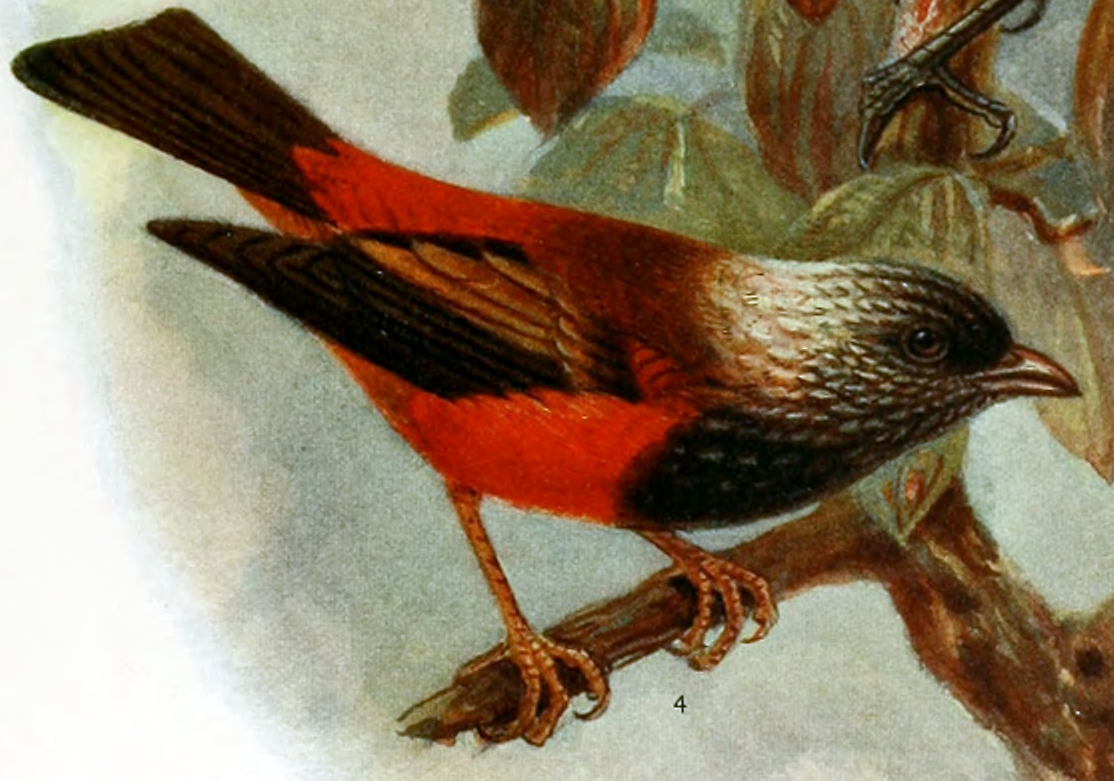
ʻUla-ʻai-hāwane

The average length of the bird was around 11 centimetres (4.3 in). With respect to coloring, the adult was patterned red overall, while the head, throat, and upper back were silvery gray. The crown, wings, breast, shoulder, and tail were black, and the tertials a white color. The legs and bill were yellowish. Immature birds were brownish overall with a bluish-gray breast, black wings and tail, and a greenish-brown back.

== Extinction ==
ʻUla-ʻai-hāwane are thought to have fed on the seeds and flowers of the loulu palms Pritchardia affinis, P. beccariana, P. lanigera and P. schattaueri. The bird's name suggests it fed on the unripe fruits (hāwane) frequently. The decline of these palms may have sealed the fate of the bird. As the ʻula-ʻai-hāwane was only ever seen near loulu palms, it may be that they were fully dependent on them for survival. The last confirmed sighting of the bird was in the Kohala Mountains in 1892; a bird apparently sporting the rather distinctive coloration of this species was also seen in 1937, but too briefly to be unequivocally identified. There are only 5 specimens of ʻula-ʻai-hāwane in museums and it was rarely seen by Europeans alive.
