= Phoeniconaias siamensis =

Phoeniconaias siamensis Temporal range: Early Miocene

Scientific classification
- Domain: Eukaryota
- Kingdom: Animalia
- Phylum: Chordata
- Class: Aves
- Order: Phoenicopteriformes
- Family: Phoenicopteridae
- Genus: Phoeniconaias
- Species: †P. siamensis

Binomial name
- †Phoeniconaias siamensis Cheneval et al., 1991

Extinct species of flamingo

Phoeniconaias siamensis is an extinct species of flamingo that lived in northern Thailand during the Miocene period. Its closest living relative is the lesser flamingo.

== History and naming ==
Phoeniconaias siamensis was named in 1991 on the basis of various postcranial material found at the Mae Long Reservoir in Li, northern Thailand. The holotype, TLi 7, is the distal end of a right tarsometatarsus, but the referred material also includes elements of both the right and left wings and hindlimbs, a scapula and a cervical vertebra.

The name derives from Siam, the historical name of Thailand.

== Description ==
One of the main ways to differentiate the three known flamingo genera is through the shape of the beak and the anatomy of the first toe bone, two features not preserved in Phoeniconaias siamensis. However the Li fossils could be referred to the genus Phoeniconaias based on the anatomy of the trochlea of the tarsometatarsus. The trochlea corresponding with the second toe shows an inner face that is elongated and not very round, while that of the third toe creates a sharp point due to it extending far beyond the outer intertrochlear notch. The size also matches the extant lesser flamingo, with P. siamensis being more robust than its modern relative and only slightly larger. Phoeniconaias siamensis is diagnosed by the following characteristics. On the supratendinal bridge of the tibiotarsus a large prominence is present. Large cotyla can be seen on the tarsometatarsus and the groove that receives the musculus fibularis is notably furrowed. The humerus bears a deep impression for the brachialis muscle and the ulna possesses a sharp tuberosity. The trochlea of the third toe shows the sharpened point typical for the genus and the distal foramen are located above the intertrochlear notch.
