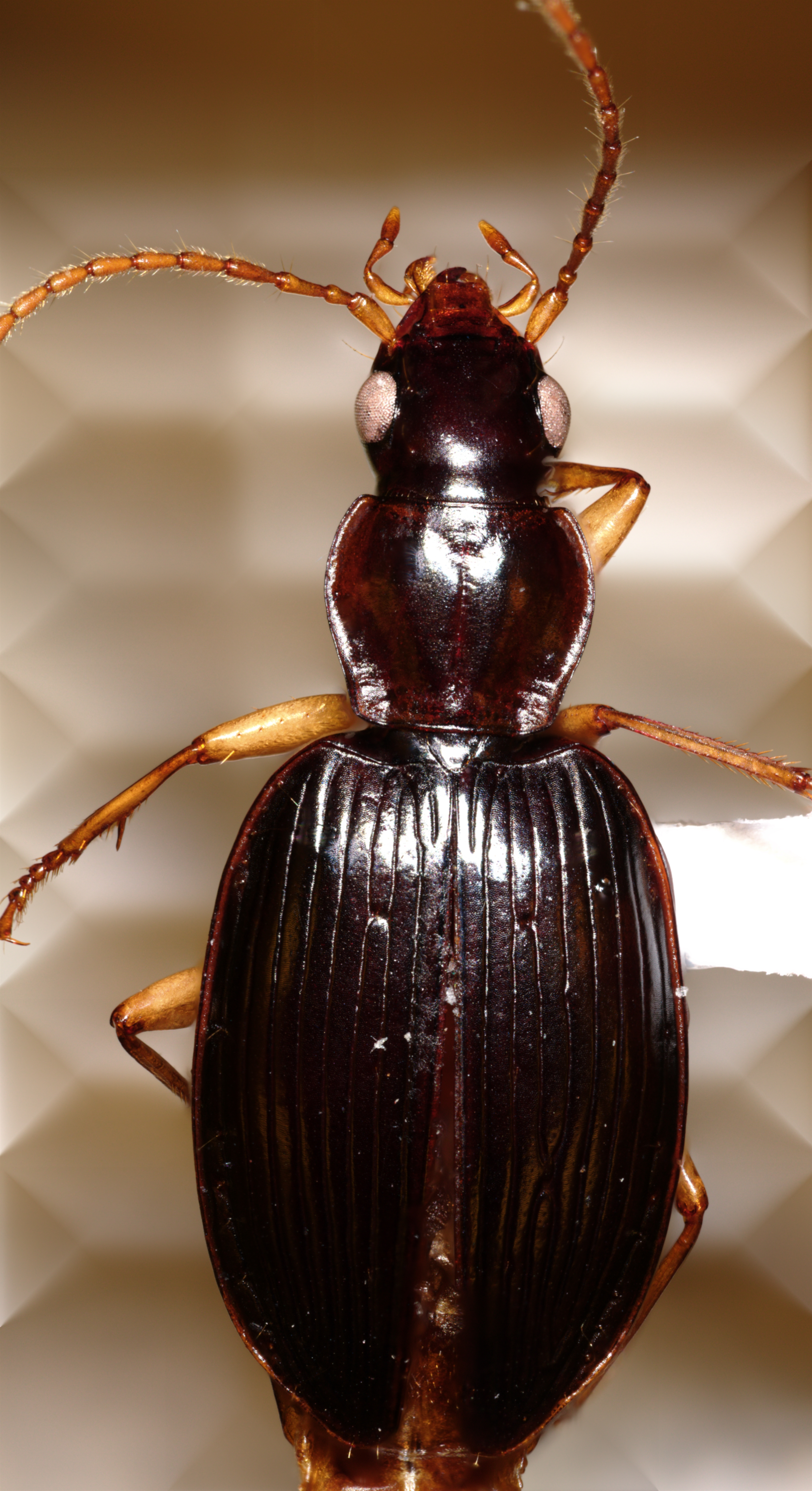
- Blackburnia kilauea

Scientific classification
- Kingdom: Animalia
- Phylum: Arthropoda
- Class: Insecta
- Order: Coleoptera
- Suborder: Adephaga
- Family: Carabidae
- Subfamily: Platyninae
- Tribe: Platynini
- Subtribe: Platynina
- Genus: Blackburnia; Sharp, 1878

Subgenera
- Blackburnia Sharp, 1878; Colpocaccus Sharp, 1903; Metromenus Sharp, 1884; Protocaccus Liebherr, 2000

Diversity
- at least 140 species

= Blackburnia =

Genus of beetles

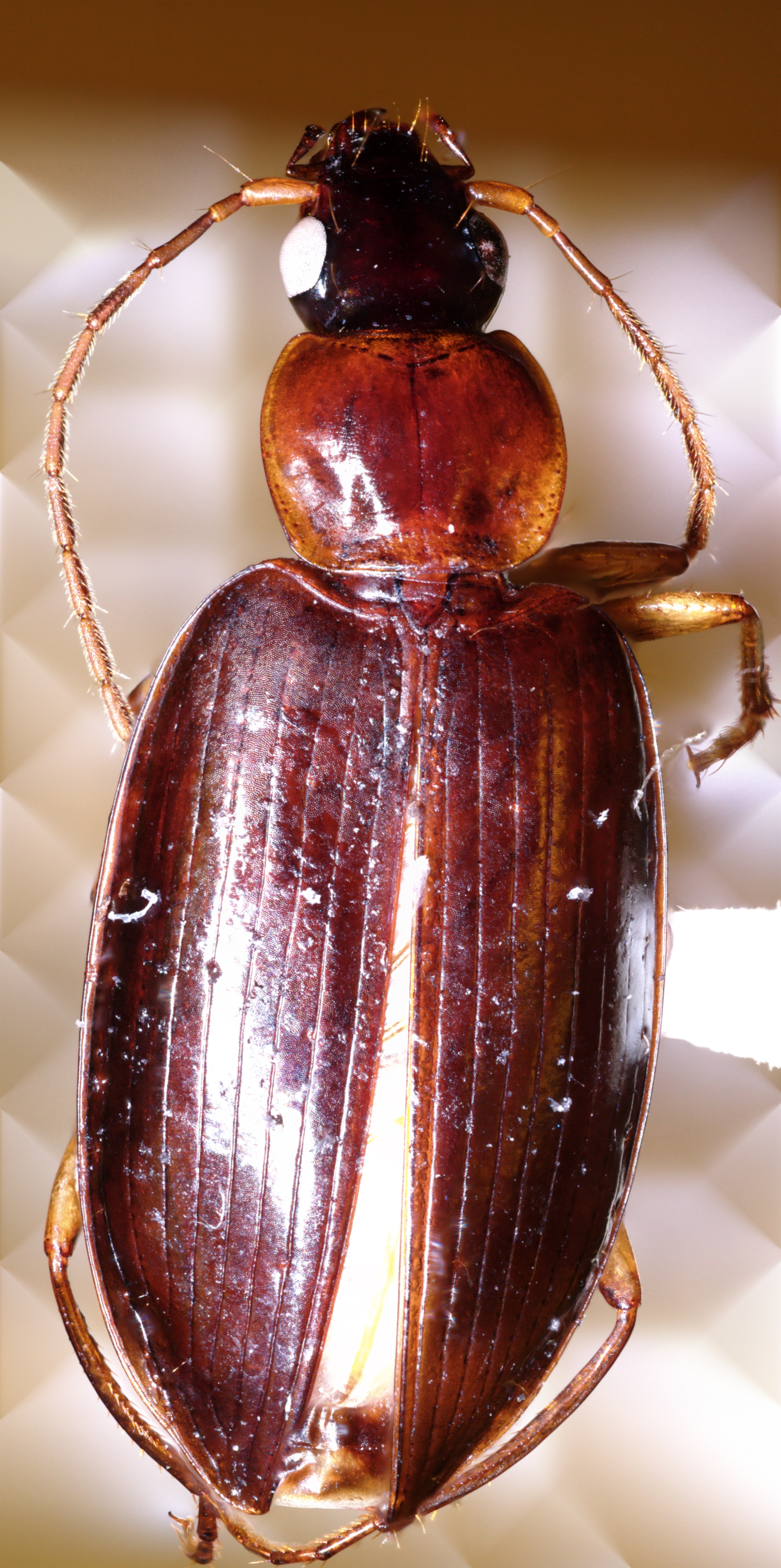
Blackburnia hawaiiensis

Blackburnia is a genus in the beetle family Carabidae, from the Hawaiian Islands. More than 40 of Blackburnia's 140 species have been described since 2000. 14 species have not been recently observed (over the past 50 years on Oahu or 100 years on the other islands). All the known extinct species have been discovered since 2015.

== Distribution ==
The Hawaiian Islands are a string of islands increasing in age from the "big island" of Hawaii in the southeast the youngest, at 500,000 years old, with successively older islands toward the northwest. Kure Atoll, in the far northwest of the Hawaiian chain, has an estimated age of 28 to 30 million years. The beetles of Blackburnia have been successively colonizing and proliferating these islands since the Miocene period, 5 to 23 million years ago, and there are now more than 130 extant species of Blackburnia endemic to the Hawaiian Islands.

== Taxonomy ==
The species of Blackburnia are divided into four subgenera. The species Blackburnia mandibularis, with its own subgenus, Protocaccus, is a sister taxon to the other groups. It lives and breeds along streams in riparian moss on the island of Kauai.

The next clade to diverge in the evolutionary tree is Colpocaccus, with four flight-capable species.

The subgenera Blackburnia and Metromenus are monophyletic sister taxa. The subgenus Blackburnia has about 57 species, based on a flight-capable ancestor. Its species are the most morphologically diversified of the four subgenera. The subgenus Metromenus contains about 71 flightless species.

== List of species ==
These 140 species belong to the genus Blackburnia:

Subgenus Protocaccus Liebherr, 2000
Blackburnia mandibularis Liebherr, 2000
Subgenus Colpocaccus Sharp, 1903
Blackburnia hawaiiensis (Sharp, 1903)
Blackburnia lanaiensis (Sharp, 1903)
Blackburnia posticata (Sharp, 1903)
Blackburnia tantalus (Blackburn, 1877)
Subgenus Blackburnia Sharp, 1878

Blackburnia aaae (Liebherr & Samuelson, 1992)
Blackburnia agilis (Sharp, 1903)
Blackburnia agonoides (Sharp, 1903)
Blackburnia anomala (Blackburn, 1878)
Blackburnia aterrima (Sharp, 1903)
Blackburnia atra Liebherr, 2000
Blackburnia blaptoides (Blackburn, 1878)
Blackburnia brevipes (Sharp, 1903)
Blackburnia bryophila Liebherr, 2000
Blackburnia cephalotes (Sharp, 1903)
Blackburnia cheloniceps (Perkins, 1917)
Blackburnia constricta (Sharp, 1903)
Blackburnia corrusca (Erichson, 1834)
Blackburnia costata (Sharp, 1903)
Blackburnia curtipes (Sharp, 1903)
Blackburnia debilis (Perkins, 1917)
Blackburnia depressa (Sharp, 1903)
Blackburnia derodera (Sharp, 1903)
Blackburnia elegans (Sharp, 1903)
Blackburnia erythropus (Sharp, 1903)
Blackburnia ewingi Liebherr, 2000
Blackburnia fracta (Sharp, 1903)
Blackburnia frigida Blackburn, 1878
Blackburnia hihia Liebherr, 2000
Blackburnia incendiaria (Blackburn, 1879)
Blackburnia insignis Sharp, 1903
Blackburnia kamehameha Liebherr, 2000
Blackburnia kipahulu Liebherr, 2000
Blackburnia koebelei (Sharp, 1903)
Blackburnia kukui Liebherr, 2000
Blackburnia lata Liebherr, 2003
Blackburnia lenta (Sharp, 1903)
Blackburnia longipes (Sharp, 1903)
Blackburnia lucipetens (Blackburn, 1879)
Blackburnia maculata (Sharp, 1903)
Blackburnia medeirosi Liebherr, 2000
Blackburnia micans (Sharp, 1903)
Blackburnia micantipennis (Sharp, 1903)
Blackburnia molokaiensis (Sharp, 1903)
Blackburnia munroi (Perkins, 1936)
Blackburnia mystica (Blackburn, 1877)
Blackburnia octoocellata (Karsch, 1881)
Blackburnia optata (Sharp, 1903)
Blackburnia perkinsi (Sharp, 1903)
Blackburnia pilikua Liebherr, 2000
Blackburnia polhemusi Liebherr, 2000
Blackburnia polipoli Liebherr, 2000
Blackburnia pukalaina Liebherr, 2000
Blackburnia puncticeps (Sharp, 1903)
Blackburnia riparia Liebherr & Short, 2006
Blackburnia rupicola (Blackburn, 1878)
Blackburnia sharpi (Blackburn, 1878)
Blackburnia sulcipennis (Sharp, 1903)
Blackburnia terebrata (Blackburn, 1881)
Blackburnia tibialis (Sharp, 1903)
Blackburnia viridis Liebherr, 2000
Blackburnia waialeale Liebherr, 2000

Subgenus Metromenus Sharp, 1884

Blackburnia abax (Sharp, 1903)
Blackburnia abaxoides Liebherr, 2000
Blackburnia alternans (Sharp, 1903)
Blackburnia ambiens (Sharp, 1903)
Blackburnia asquithi Liebherr, 2000
Blackburnia auana Liebherr, 2000
Blackburnia audax (Perkins, 1917)
Blackburnia barda (Blackburn, 1877)
Blackburnia bartletti Liebherr, 2000
Blackburnia calathiformis (Sharp, 1903)
Blackburnia calathoides (Sharp, 1903)
Blackburnia caliginosa (Blackburn, 1877)
Blackburnia concolor (Sharp, 1903)
Blackburnia cuneipennis (Blackburn, 1877)
Blackburnia dyscolea (Sharp, 1903)
Blackburnia epicurus (Blackburn, 1877)
Blackburnia erro (Blackburn, 1878)
Blackburnia filipes (Sharp, 1903)
Blackburnia fordi Liebherr, 2000
Blackburnia fossipennis (Blackburn, 1877)
Blackburnia foveolata Liebherr, 2000
Blackburnia fractistriata (Perkins, 1917)
Blackburnia fraterna (Blackburn, 1877)
Blackburnia fraudator (Sharp, 1903)
Blackburnia fugitiva (Blackburn, 1877)
Blackburnia fulgida Liebherr, 2000
Blackburnia gastrellariformis Liebherr, 2001
Blackburnia gracilis (Sharp, 1903)
Blackburnia hakeakapa Liebherr, 2000
Blackburnia haleakala Liebherr, 2000
Blackburnia hilaris (Perkins, 1917)
Blackburnia howarthi (Liebherr & Samuelson, 1992)
Blackburnia huhula Liebherr, 2000
Blackburnia insociabilis (Blackburn, 1878)
Blackburnia ipu Liebherr, 2000
Blackburnia kahili Liebherr, 2000
Blackburnia kauaiensis (Sharp, 1903)
Blackburnia kauwa Liebherr, 2000
Blackburnia kavanaughi Liebherr, 2006
Blackburnia kilauea Liebherr, 2000
Blackburnia komohana Liebherr, 2000
Blackburnia kuiki Liebherr, 2000
Blackburnia lanaihalensis Liebherr, 2000
Blackburnia latifrons (Sharp, 1903)
Blackburnia lihau Liebherr, 2000
Blackburnia limbata (Sharp, 1903)
Blackburnia longula (Sharp, 1903)
Blackburnia meticulosa (Blackburn, 1877)
Blackburnia metromenoides (Perkins, 1917)
Blackburnia microps (Sharp, 1903)
Blackburnia moerens (Sharp, 1903)
Blackburnia muscicola (Blackburn, 1877)
Blackburnia mutabilis (Blackburn, 1877)
Blackburnia oceanica (Blackburn, 1877)
Blackburnia opaca (Sharp, 1903)
Blackburnia optimus (Sharp, 1903)
Blackburnia palmae (Blackburn, 1877)
Blackburnia paloloensis Liebherr, 2000
Blackburnia paludicola Liebherr, 2000
Blackburnia pauma Liebherr, 2000
Blackburnia pavida (Sharp, 1903)
Blackburnia perpolita (Sharp, 1903)
Blackburnia platynoides (Sharp, 1903)
Blackburnia platyophthalmica Liebherr, 2000
Blackburnia proterva (Blackburn, 1877)
Blackburnia putealis (Blackburn, 1881)
Blackburnia sphodriformis (Sharp, 1903)
Blackburnia transiens (Sharp, 1903)
Blackburnia tricolor (Sharp, 1903)
Blackburnia ulaula Liebherr, 2000
Blackburnia vagans (Sharp, 1903)

Extinct species
†Blackburnia burneyi Liebherr & Porch, 2015
†Blackburnia cryptipes Liebherr & Porch, 2015
†Blackburnia godzilla Liebherr & Porch, 2015
†Blackburnia menehune Liebherr & Porch, 2015
†Blackburnia mothra Liebherr & Porch, 2015
†Blackburnia ovata Liebherr & Porch, 2015
†Blackburnia rugosa Liebherr & Porch, 2015
