= Chickcharney =

Bahamian legendary creature

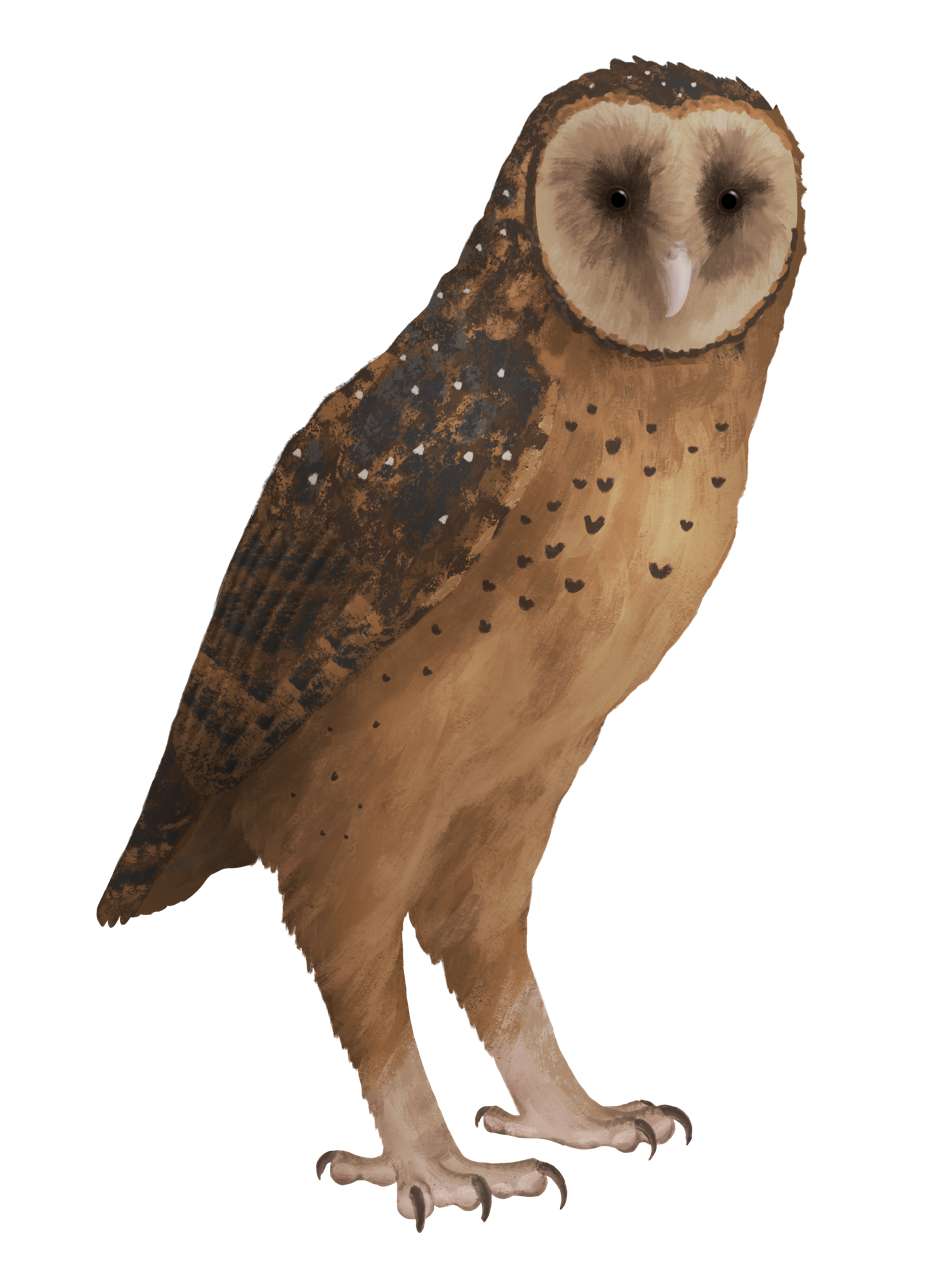
- An illustration of Tyto pollens, a species that may have inspired myths of the chickcharney

Origin
- Region: Andros, The Bahamas
- Habitat: Bahamian pineyards

The chickcharney is a type of legendary creature in the folklore of Andros in the Bahamas. They are described as mischievous feathered creatures with red eyes, three toes on each foot, and long prehensile tails. Their heads are said to be able to turn all the way around. They are believed to live in pine forests and will either curse or bless travelers depending on how they are treated. They are described either as large owls or as feathered humanoid creatures that merely resemble owls. They allegedly build nests by tying the tops of pine trees together.

One myth of the chickharney involves Neville Chamberlain, a former Prime Minister of the United Kingdom. According to legend, when he was around 20 years old, Neville Chamberlain worked on a sisal plantation in the Bahamas owned by his father Joseph Chamberlain. The story states that the plantation faced financial failure because Chamberlain angered some chickcharnies by cutting down their trees. The myth further alleges that Chamberlain's Munich Agreement failed to prevent the Nazi invasion of Czechoslovakia because of a curse placed by the chickcharnies.

A 1995 United States Forest Service paper by forester Bruce G. Marcot claims that the legend of the chickcharney was likely based on the prehistoric barn owl species Tyto pollens, which coexisted with ancient humans in the Bahamas. Paleontologist Lisa G. Buckley claimed that this theory was likely true, stating that T. pollens had a geographical and temporal overlap with the origin of the chickcharney myth.
