= Oscar Arredondo =

Cuban paleontologist

Oscar Paulino Arredondo de la Mata (18 July 1918 – 20 July 2001) was a Cuban paleontologist. He described a number of birds and mammals of the Quaternary Period from fossils obtained from Cuban caves. He has been called the "father of Cuban vertebrate paleontology".

Oscar Arredondo was born in Havana in the Quarter of the Pillar. He lived in that area until 1955. Born in a family of ordinary means with six other siblings, he studied at the local public school (number 33). He took an interest in natural history early in life and learnt about animals on his own. In 1936 he sang with tango music groups for various radio stations and was an actor in the local theatre. In 1942 he worked at a local hair salon apart from selling fruits and as being a representative for theater workers. He continued his personal studies and sketched various local birds. In 1945 he took an interest in exploring caves and began to explore fossils found in the caves of Cuba. In order to join the expeditions of the Speleological Society of Cuba, he began to work as a postman, a job he held for the 36 years before retiring in 1984.

Arredondo's work on paleontology was mostly on the birds and mammals of the Quaternary, and he described a Cuban condor (he placed it in the genus Sarcoramphus, but it was later identified as Titanohierax borrasi), an eagle, several owls, including the giant Ornimegalonyx and a Teratorn. He wrote both scientific (nearly 134) and popular science articles. Several species were named after him including Pulsatrix arredondoi Brodkorb (1968), Capromys arroundondoi Varona (1984), Cerion (Strophiops) arroundondoi Jaime (1984) and Solenodon arredondoi Morgan & Ottenwalder, (1993).
