= Eginsai Formation =

Geological formation in Kazakhstan

- Stratigraphic range: Late Campanian-early Maastrichtian; ~72–68 Ma
- Type: Geological formation

Lithology
- Primary: Siltstone
- Other: Phosphorite

Location
- Coordinates: 52.4°N 64.6°E
- Approximate paleocoordinates: 45.5°N 56.1°E
- Region: Kustanai
- Country: Kazakhstan
- Eginsai Formation (Kazakhstan)

The Eginsai Formation (Russian: Eginsai Svita) is a geological formation in Kazakhstan whose strata date back to the Late Cretaceous. Dinosaur remains are among the fossils that have been recovered from the formation.

== Fossil content ==
Color key: Taxon / Reclassified taxon / Taxon falsely reported as present / Dubious taxon or junior synonym / Ichnotaxon / Ootaxon / Morphotaxon	Notes; Uncertain or tentative taxa are in small text; ~~crossed out~~ taxa are discredited.

=== Birds ===
Birds of the Eginsai Formation
Genus	Species	Location	Stratigraphic position	Material	Notes	Image
Asiahesperornis	A. bazhanovi	Kustanai	Early Maastrichtian	Vertebrae, Tarsometatarsus, and Tibiotarsus.	A asiahesperornithine hesperornithid	

=== Mollusks ===
==== Bivalves ====
Bivalves of the Eginsai Formation
Genus	Species	Location	Stratigraphic position	Material	Notes	Image
Turgaiscapha	T. kushmurunica	Kustanai	Late Campanian to Early Maastrichtian	Shell	A bivalve	

== See also ==
- List of dinosaur-bearing rock formations
