= Tyto campiterrae =

Tyto campiterrae Temporal range: Late Miocene

Scientific classification
- Domain: Eukaryota
- Kingdom: Animalia
- Phylum: Chordata
- Class: Aves
- Order: Strigiformes
- Family: Tytonidae
- Genus: Tyto
- Species: †T. campiterrae

Binomial name
- †Tyto campiterrae Jánossy, 1991

Extinct species of owl

Tyto campiterrae is an extinct species of owl in the genus Tyto that lived during the Late Miocene.

== Distribution ==
Tyto campiterrae fossils are known from the site of Polgárdi in Hungary.
