= Horusornis =

Horusornis Temporal range: Late Eocene

Scientific classification
- Domain: Eukaryota
- Kingdom: Animalia
- Phylum: Chordata
- Class: Aves
- Order: Accipitriformes
- Family: †Horusornithidae; Mourer-Chauviré, 1991
- Genus: †Horusornis; Mourer-Chauviré, 1991
- Species: †H. vianeyliaudae

Binomial name
- †Horusornis vianeyliaudae Mourer-Chauviré, 1991

Extinct family of birds

Horusornis is a prehistoric bird of prey in the order Accipitriformes. Its name means "Horus-bird", after the Egyptian god Horus who was sometimes depicted as a falcon.

Horusornis vianeyliaudae is the only known species. It lived approximately at the end of the Eocene, some 35 mya in what today is France. Its fossils were found in Quercy.
