= Richard L. Zusi =

American ornithologist (1930–2024)

Richard Laurence Zusi
- Born: January 27, 1930; Winchester, Massachusetts, U.S.
- Died: January 15, 2024 (aged 93); Olympia, Washington, U.S.
- Known for: Ornithology; Taxidermy
- Spouse: Luvia

Richard Laurence Zusi (January 27, 1930 – January 15, 2024) was an American ornithologist, known as a world-class expert on hummingbird anatomy and the functional anatomy of birds, in particular "avian jaw mechanics and the evolution of structural complexes."

== Life and career ==
Zusi grew up in Toronto. He graduated in 1951 with a bachelor's degree from Northwestern University. In the zoology department of the University of Michigan he graduated with an M.S. in 1953 and a Ph.D. in 1959. From 1958 to 1963 he taught at the University of Maine. In 1963 he was hired by Philip Strong Humphrey (1926–2009) for the Division of Birds of the National Museum of Natural History in Washington, D.C.

Zusi was chiefly responsible for the modernization of the Smithsonian Institution's avian skeleton collection (over 30,000 specimens) and avian fluid-preserved collection (over 10,000 specimens). (The fluid used is commonly ethanol or isopropyl alcohol.)

His pioneering World Inventory of Avian Skeletal Specimens was one of the first and best efforts to inventory a particular biological resource in systematic collections.

His research interests are the functional anatomy of birds with emphasis on feeding mechanisms, and avian systematics and evolution.

Zusi collected avian specimens not only in the United States and Canada, but also in South America (Brazil, Ecuador, Venezuela), the Caribbean (Dominica), and Iceland. He was the principal curator of the Roger Tory Peterson Exhibition, which was displayed from April to September in 1984. He retired in 1994 with the title "curator emeritus".

He was elected a fellow of the American Ornithologists' Union (AOU) in 1971.

Zusi died in Olympia, Washington on January 15, 2024, at the age of 93.

== Selected publications ==
- Zusi, Richard L. (1962). Structural adaptations of the head and neck in the black skimmer (PDF). Publications of the Nuttall Ornithological Club, Number 3. Cambridge, Massachusetts.
- Watson, George E.; Zusi, R. L.; Storer, Robert W. (1963). Preliminary Field Guide to the Birds of the Indian Ocean. Washington, D.C.: Smithsonian Institution; x+214 pages
- Zusi, R. L. (1971). "Functional Anatomy in Systematics". Taxon. 20 (1): 75–84. Bibcode:1971Taxon..20...75Z. doi:10.2307/1218536. JSTOR 1218536.
- Zusi, R. L. (1982). "Infraspecific Geographic Variation and the Subspecies Concept". The Auk. 99 (3): 606–608. JSTOR 4085956.
- Zusi, R. L. (1984). A functional and evolutionary analysis of rhynchokinesis in birds (PDF). Smithsonian Contributions to Zoology, Number 395.
- Zusi, R. L. (1987). "A Feeding Adaptation of the Jaw Articulation in New World Jays (Corvidae)". The Auk. 104 (4): 665–680. doi:10.1093/auk/104.4.665. JSTOR 4087278.
- Zusi, R. L. (1989). "A Modified Jaw Muscle in the Maui Parrotbill (Pseudonestor: Drepanididae)". The Condor. 91 (3): 716–720. doi:10.2307/1368125. JSTOR 1368125.
- Hanken, James; Hall, Brian K., eds. (1993). "Patterns of diversity in the avian skull by Richard L. Zusi". The Skull, 2: Patterns of Structural and Systematic Diversity. University of Chicago Press. pp. 391–437. ISBN 9780226315706.
- Livezey, Bradley C.; Zusi, R. L. (2001). "Higher-Order Phylogenetics of Modern Aves Based On Comparative Anatomy". Netherlands Journal of Zoology. 51 (2): 179–205. doi:10.1163/156854201X00260. ISSN 0028-2960.
- Livezey, Bradley C.; Zusi, R. L. (2007). "Higher-order phylogeny of modern birds (Theropoda, Aves: Neornithes) based on comparative anatomy. II. Analysis and discussion". Zoological Journal of the Linnean Society. 149 (1): 1–95. doi:10.1111/j.1096-3642.2006.00293.x. ISSN 1096-3642. PMC 2517308. PMID 18784798. (over 600 citations)
- Zusi, R. L. (2013). "Introduction to the Skeleton of Hummingbirds (Aves: Apodiformes, Trochilidae) in Functional and Phylogenetic Contexts". Ornithological Monographs. 77: 1–94. doi:10.1525/om.2013.77.1.1.

== Eponyms ==
- Heliangelus zusii Graves, 1993
