= Stilt-owl =

Stilt-owl Temporal range: Holocene

Scientific classification
- Domain: Eukaryota
- Kingdom: Animalia
- Phylum: Chordata
- Class: Aves
- Order: Strigiformes
- Family: Strigidae
- Genus: †Grallistrix

Species
- Grallistrix auceps Grallistrix erdmani Grallistrix geleches Grallistrix orion

Extinct genus of birds

The stilt-owls (Grallistrix) is an extinct genus of true owls which contains four species, all of which lived on the Hawaiian Islands.

Grallistrix can be loosely translated as "owl on stilts". The genus received this name due to the long legs and terrestrial habits which they evolved in the absence of mammalian predators on their island homes. They fed on smaller birds such as Hawaiian honeycreepers. They were also able to fly, but likely did most of their hunting on the ground, filling the niches occupied by medium-sized predatory mammals elsewhere.

The owls were never seen alive by scientists and are known only from subfossil bones.

== Species ==
- Kaua‘i stilt-owl, Grallistrix auceps
- Maui stilt-owl, Grallistrix erdmani
- Moloka‘i stilt-owl, Grallistrix geleches
- O‘ahu stilt-owl, Grallistrix orion

== See also ==
- Tyto pollens
- Ornimegalonyx
- List of Late Quaternary prehistoric bird species
- List of extinct bird species since 1500
- List of fossil bird genera
- List of extinct animals
- Flightless birds
