= Helen F. James =

American paleontologist and paleornithologist

Helen Frances James
- Born: May 22, 1956 (age 70); Hot Springs, Arkansas, U.S.
- Education: University of Arkansas; University of Oxford
- Scientific career
- Fields: Paleontology, Ornithology

Helen Frances James (born May 22, 1956) is an American paleontologist and paleornithologist who has published extensively on the fossil birds of the Hawaiian Islands. She is the curator in charge of birds in the Department of Vertebrate Zoology at the National Museum of Natural History in Washington, D.C.

== Early life ==
James was born in a U.S. Army hospital in Hot Springs, Arkansas on May 22, 1956, to two ecologists. She was brought up on a farm at the base of Kessler Mountain near Fayetteville, in the Arkansas Ozarks. At age eight, her family moved up slope to a custom-built house in the woods, where she developed an interest in natural history and archaeology. James' parents encouraged an appreciation for nature in her and her sisters, taking them on trips within the Ozarks, to the American southwest, and to Mexico. James found some Amerindian artifacts on these excursions, leading her to join the Northwest Arkansas Archaeological Association at age twelve. At age 14, her father accepted a one-year Fulbright Fellowship, and the family moved to Cape Coast, Ghana.

== Education ==
On returning from Ghana, at the age of 16, James attended the University of Arkansas, where her mentors included Michael P. Hoffman. She graduated in 1977 after studying archaeology and biological anthropology.

During her studies, James was a summer volunteer in the Paleobiology Department of the National Museum of Natural History in Washington. She also researched Amerindian skeletons in the museum's Physical Anthropology section and worked on the anatomy and systematics of hummingbirds with Richard Zusi.

== Career ==
Following graduation, James continued to work on hummingbirds with Zusi. When his grant ran out, she accepted a position helping Storrs Olson identify fossil birds from the Hawaiian Islands. The study of Hawaii's fossil birds, of which there were an abundance of undescribed species, became a long-term collaborative research program for James and Olson. (They were married in 1981 but later divorced.) From the fossil record, they identified about 60 bird species of Hawaii that had become extinct. Through this research on Holocene fossil birds James showed that massive extinctions of birds had occurred following human colonization of the Hawaiian Islands.

In 2000, James earned a DPhil in zoology from the University of Oxford, with a dissertation on the comparative osteology and phylogeny of the Hawaiian finches (Drepanidini). She has also conducted research on the fossil vertebrates and paleoecology of Madagascar, the comparative osteology and phylogenetics of perching birds, and the evolution of island waterfowl.

James was a founding member of the executive council of the Society of Avian Paleontology and Evolution and serves on the council of the American Institute of Biological Sciences as the member representative for the American Ornithologists' Union. She is also an affiliated faculty member at the University of Maryland with the biological sciences graduate program.

In 2005 and beyond, James was a curator of birds at the National Museum of Natural History.
