= Storrs L. Olson =

American biologist and ornithologist (1944–2021)

- Born: 3 April 1944; Chicago, Illinois
- Died: 20 January 2021 (aged 76); Fredericksburg, Virginia
- Occupation: Avian paleontologist
- Spouses: Helen F. James (m. 1981; div. 2006) Johanna Rose Humphrey (m. 2016)

Storrs Lovejoy Olson (April 3, 1944 – January 20, 2021) was an American biologist and ornithologist who spent his career at the Smithsonian Institution, retiring in 2008. One of the world's foremost avian paleontologists, he was best known for his studies of fossil and subfossil birds on islands such as Ascension, St. Helena and Hawaii. His early higher education took place at Florida State University in 1966, where he obtained a B.A. in biology, and the University of Florida, where he received an M.S. in biology. Olson's doctoral studies took place at Johns Hopkins University, in what was then the School of Hygiene and Public Health. He was married to fellow paleornithologist Helen F. James.

== Early life and education ==
Olson was born April 4, 1944, in Chicago, Illinois. His father was physical oceanographer Franklyn C. W. Olson. He was named after his maternal conservationist grandfather P. S. Lovejoy. Franklyn worked at Ohio University's Stone Laboratory on Gibraltar Island. In these lacustrine surroundings, Storrs developed an interest in fish.

In 1950, Olson's family moved to Tallahassee, Florida, when Franklyn took a job at Florida State University. Young Olson's interests shifted to ornithology at age 12. Olson graduated from Leon High School in 1962. In 1963, he moved to Panama to assist a friend with his research on fish. He would return to Panama in 1966 as an undergraduate, to study the immunology of vultures.

His higher education began at the University of Florida under the colorful Pierce Brodkorb and spurred his interest in paleornithology. He returned to Florida State in 1968 to complete his master's degree.

== Career and graduate education ==
Olson's work in Panama attracted the attention of Alexander Wetmore in 1967, as Wetmore was preparing a monograph on Panama bird life. Their contact at the National Museum of Natural History (NMNH)—administered by the Smithsonian—earned Olson a summer job in the Fish and Wildlife Service under Richard C. Banks the next year. He then became resident manager at the Smithsonian's new Chesapeake Bay Center in Edgewater, Maryland.

The center had connections to Johns Hopkins University, and Olson was encouraged to enroll there for graduate school. He would matriculate at the School of Hygiene and Public Health in the Department of Pathobiology under Bernhard Bang. With the Smithsonian's backing, Olson went to Ascension Island and Saint Helena in 1970 and 1971, where he discovered the Saint Helena hoopoe and the Saint Helena crake. This work was the basis of his dissertation on the evolution of rails. Johns Hopkins would award Olson an Sc.D. in 1972.

By August 1971 he was working at the NMNH on a predoctoral fellowship. He wrote on fossil rails for a 1977 monograph by Sidney Dillon Ripley. In March 1975, he was made curator of the Division of Birds.

In 1976 he met his future wife Helen F. James who later became another notable paleornithologist herself, focusing on Late Quaternary prehistoric birds. During their pioneering research work on Hawaii, which lasted 23 years, Olson and James found and described the remains of 50 extinct bird species new to science, including the nēnē-nui, the moa-nalos, the apteribises, and the Grallistrix "stilt-owls". He was also one of the authors of the description of the extinct rodent Noronhomys vespuccii. In 1982, he discovered subfossil bones of the long ignored Brace's emerald on the Bahamas, which gave evidence that this hummingbird is a valid and distinct species.

In November 1999, Olson wrote an open letter to the National Geographic Society, in which he criticized Christopher P. Sloan's claims about the dinosaur-to-bird transition which referred to the fake species "Archaeoraptor". In 2000, he helped to resolve the mystery of Necropsar leguati from the World Museum Liverpool, which turned out to be an albinistic specimen of the grey trembler.

== Personal life ==
Olson was married to his long-time colleague Helen F. James from 1981 until their divorce in 2006.

== Honors ==
Olson has been decorated as one of the world's foremost paleornithologists. He was also the 1994 recipient of the Loye and Alden Miller Research Award. He was formerly curator of birds at the United States National Museum of Natural History; as of 2009, he held an emeritus position in the institution.

Several prehistoric bird species have been named after Olson, including Nycticorax olsoni, Himantopus olsoni, Puffinus olsoni, Primobucco olsoni, Gallirallus storrsolsoni, and Quercypodargus olsoni. In addition, a sand stargazer fish, Storrsia olsoni has its binomial derived from and honouring Olson, who collected the type off Brazil.
