= List of Gruiformes by population =

This is a list of Gruiformes species by global population. While numbers are estimates, they have been made by the experts in their fields. For more information on how these estimates were ascertained, see Wikipedia's articles on population biology and population ecology.

Not all Gruiformes have had their numbers quantified, but species without population estimates are included in a secondary table below.

The IOC World Bird List (version 15.1) recognizes 190 species of Gruiformes, 21 of which are extinct. Species status within Gruiformes is particularly unresolved compared to other orders. As of December 2025, IOC lists six species which are considered subspecies by IUCN/BirdLife International. Similarly, IUCN/BirdLife International list four species which still have subspecies status in IOC taxonomies. See 'Notes' column of included tables for more information on these taxonomic disputes.

This list follows IUCN classifications for species names and taxonomy. Where IUCN classifications differ from other ornithological authorities, alternative names and taxonomies are noted.

Several species included as members of Gruiformes are extinct:

- Réunion rail (Dryolimnas augusti) - last observed circa 1670.
- Hawkin's rail (Diaphorapteryx hawkinsi) - went extinct in the latter half of 19th century.
- Chatham Islands rail (Cabalus modestus) - last observed between 1895-1900.
- Bar-winged rail (Hypotaenidia poeciloptera) - last observed in 1890.
- Dieffenbach's rail (Hypotaenidia dieffenbachii) - last observed in 1840.
- Tahiti rail (Hypotaenidia pacifica) - went extinct some time during the 1930s.
- Wake Island rail (Hypotaenidia wakensis) - last observed in 1945.
- Tristan moorhen (Gallinula nesiotis) - last observed in 1861.
- Mascarene coot (Fulica newtonii) - extinct since early 1700s.
- White swamphen (Porphyrio albus) - extinct by 1834.
- Marquesan swamphen (Porphyrio paepae) - extinct by 1937.
- North island takahē (Porphyrio mantelli) - last observed in 1894.
- Ascension crake (Mundia elpenor) - only record comes from 1656. Extinct by 1700.
- St. Helena rail (Aphanocrex podarces) - extinct by end of 16th century.
- St. Helena crake (Zapornia astrictocarpus) - extinct soon after discovery of St. Helena, ca. 1502.
- Kosrae crake (Zapornia monasa) - last observed in 1828; extinct by end of 19th century.
- Miller's rail or Tahiti crake (Zapornia nigra) - last observed in 1784.
- Hawaiian rail (Zapornia sandwichensis) - extinct by end of 1860s.
- Laysan rail (Zapornia palmeri) - extinct in 1944.
- Red rail (Aphanapteryx bonasia) - extinct by end of 17th century.
- Rodrigues rail (Erythromachus leguati) - last recorded in 1726, extinct by 1761.

== Species by global population ==
Common name	Binomial name	Population	Status	Trend	Notes	Image
Samoan moorhen (Samoan woodhen)	Gallinula pacifica	0-49	CR	?	May be extinct. Last confirmed record in 1873; recent surveys have returned no evidence of an extant population. IUCN/BirdLife International place species in genus Pareudiastes.	
Makira woodhen	Gallinula silvestris	1-49	CR	?	Last undisputed scientific observation occurred in 1953; however, unconfirmed sightings as recently as 2014 indicate the species persists in small numbers. IUCN/BirdLife International place species in genus Pareudiastes.	
New Caledonian rail	Gallirallus lafresnayanus	1-49	CR	?	May be extinct. Last confirmed sighting in 1890, and no unconfirmed sightings since 1984.	
Guam rail	Hypotaenidia owstoni	1-49	CR	▲	Species was formerly extinct in the wild. A reintroduced population is now established on Cocos.	
Zapata rail	Mustelirallus cerverai	50-249	CR	▼	Total population is estimated to be 70-400 individuals. IUCN/BirdLife International place species in genus Cyanolimnas.	
White-winged flufftail	Sarothrura ayresi	50-249	CR	▼	Best estimate for number of mature individuals is 226.	
South Island takahē (Takahē)	Porphyrio hochstetteri	50-249	EN	▲	Total population is estimated to be 418 individuals.	
Whooping crane	Grus americana	50-249	EN	▲	Total wild population is 483 individuals; the only self-sustaining breeding population contains 329 individuals, of whom less than 250 are mature.	
Black-winged trumpeter	Psophia obscura	50-400	CR	▼	Note that IOC does not recognize as a full species; classifies as a subspecies of dark-winged trumpeter.	
Masked finfoot	Heliopais personatus	108-304	CR	▼		
Lord Howe woodhen	Hypotaenidia sylvestris	200-286	EN	▲	Endemic to Lord Howe Island. Best estimate for number of mature individuals is 230.	
Plain-flanked rail	Rallus wetmorei	200-1,000	EN	▼		
Sakalava rail	Zapornia olivieri	250-999	EN	▼		
Slender-billed flufftail	Sarothrura watersi	250-999	NT	▼		
Okinawa rail	Hypotaenidia okinawae	480	EN	▼	Total population is estimated to be 720 individuals.	
Talaud rail	Gymnocrex talaudensis	500-2,500	EN	▼	Best estimate for number of mature individuals is 500-1,000.	
Chestnut-headed flufftail	Sarothrura lugens	670-6,700	LC	▼	Total population is estimated to be 1,000-10,000 individuals.	
Rusty-flanked crake	Laterallus levraudi	1,000-2,499	VU	▼	Total population is estimated to be 1,500-3,750 individuals.	
Austral rail	Rallus antarcticus	1,000-9,999	VU	▼	Best estimate for number of mature individuals is 2,500-9,999.	
Rufous-faced crake	Rufirallus xenopterus	1,000-10,000	VU	▼	IUCN/BirdLife International place species in genus Laterallus.	
Hawaiian coot	Fulica alai	1,250-1,750	NT	Steady	Total population is estimated to be, at minimum, 1,248– 2,577 individuals.	
New Britain rail (Pink-legged rail)	Hypotaenida insignis	1,500-7,000	NT	▼	Total population is estimated to be 2,500-9,999 individuals.	
Rouget's rail	Rougetius rougetii	1,500-7,000	NT	▼	Total population is estimated to be 2,500-9,999 individuals.	
Madagascar rail	Rallus madagascariensis	1,600-6,700	VU	▼	Total population is estimated to be 2,500-10,000 individuals.	
Auckland Island rail (Auckland rail)	Lewinia muelleri	2,000	VU	Steady		
Red-crowned crane	Grus japonensis	2,000-2,650	VU	▼	Best estimate for number of mature individuals is 2,300.	
Calayan rail	Aptenorallus calayanensis	2,500-6,000	VU	▼		
Tsingy forest rail	Mentocrex beankaensis	2,500-9,999	VU	▼		
Roviana rail	Hypotaenida rovianae	2,500-9,999	LC	Steady	Population estimated is considered to be outdated.	
Talaud bush-hen	Amaurornis magnirostris	2,500-20,000	VU	▼		
Galapagos rail (Galapagos crake)	Laterallus spilonota	3,300-6,700	VU	▼	Total population is estimated to be 5,000-10,000 individuals.	
Siberian crane	Leucogeranus leucogeranus	3,500-4,000	CR	▼	Values given are for total population.	
Bogotá rail	Rallus semiplumbeus	3,700	VU	▼	Total population is estimated to be 5,600 individuals.	
White-naped crane	Antigone vipio	3,700-4,500	VU	▼	Total population is estimated to be 6,250-6,750 individuals. IUCN/BirdLife International place species in genus Grus.	
Henderson Island crake (Red-eyed crake)	Zapornia atra	3,800-8,400	VU	Steady	Best estimate for number of mature individuals is 6,400 individuals. To population is estimated to be 8,513 individuals.	
Junin rail (Junin crake)	Laterallus tuerosi	4,100	EN	▼	Note that IOC taxonomy treats this species as a subspecies of black rail (L. jamaicensis).	
Horned coot	Fulica cornuta	5,000-25,000	NT	▼		
White-throated rail	Dryolimnas cuvieri	5,099-7,499	LC	?	Values are for total population. Likely a large underestimate, as numbers do not include an estimate for Madagascar, which composes the majority of the species' range.	
Inaccessible Island rail	Laterallus rogersi	5,460-7,320	VU	Steady	Best estimate for number of mature individuals is 6,180. Total population is estimated to be 9,100 - 12,200 individuals.	
Wattled crane	Grus carunculata	6,000-6,300	VU	▼	Total population is estimated to be 9,000-10,000 individuals. IUCN/BirdLife International give the binomial name Bugeranus carunculatus.	
Black-necked crane	Grus nigricollis	6,600-6,800	NT	Steady	Total population is estimated to be 10,000-10,200 individuals.	
Black-tailed native-hen	Tribonyx ventralis	6,600-670,000	LC	Steady	Total population is estimated to be 10,000-1,000,000 individuals.	
Andaman crake	Rallina canningi	6,700-17,000	LC	▼	Total population is estimated to be 10,000-25,000 individuals.	
Yellow rail	Coturnicops noveboracensis	6,700-17,000	LC	▼	Total population is estimated to be 10,000-25,000 individuals.	
Madagascar flufftail	Sarothrura insularis	6,700-66,700	LC	?	Total population is estimated to be 10,000-100,000 individuals.	
Spotted rail	Pardirallus maculatus	7,000-18,000	LC	Steady	Total population is estimated to be 11,000-26,700 individuals. Population may be larger than estimated.	
Yellow-breasted crake	Laterallus flaviventer	>7,000	LC	?		
Dot-winged crake	Laterallus spilopterus	8,000-19,999	NT	▼		
Gough Island moorhen (Gough moorhen)	Gallinula comeri	8,500	VU	Steady	Total population is estimated to be 13,000 individuals. Note that there are ~4,000 additional mature individuals on Tristan da Cunha, but they are introduced, and thus not counted in IUCN estimates.	
Hooded crane	Grus monacha	9,750-13,000	VU	▲	Total population is estimated to be 15,000-18,000 individuals.	
Speckled rail	Laterallus notatus	10,000	LC	?	Value is for total population. May be a large underestimate. IUCN/BirdLife International list species in genus Coturnicops.	
Ridgway's rail	Rallus obsoletus	10,000-19,999	NT	▼		
Slaty-breasted wood-rail	Aramides saracura	10,000-25,000	LC	▼		
Azure galliule	Porphyrio flavirostris	10,000-25,000	LC	Steady	Values are for total population; likely an underestimate.	
Striped crake	Aenigmatolimnas marginalis	10,000-25,000	LC	?	IUCN/BirdLife International place species in genus Amaurornis.	
Black rail	Laterallus jamaicensis	10,000-49,999	EN	▼		
Giant coot	Fulica gigantea	10,000-50,000	LC	Steady		
African crake	Crex egregia	10,000-1,000,000	LC	?	Values given are for total population, but estimate is considered to be outdated.	
Buff-banded rail	Hypotaenidia philippensis	10,600-141,000	LC	Steady	Total population is estimated to be 15,850-210,991 individuals.	
Blackish rail	Pardirallus nigricans	13,300-73,300	LC	?	Total population is estimated to be 20,000-110,000 individuals.	
Mexican rail (Aztec rail)	Rallus tenuirostris	15,000	NT	▼		
Brown wood-rail	Aramides wolfi	>15,000	LC	▼	No formal estimates have been quantified. Values assume a very conservative species density from limited surveys.	
Sarus crane	Antigone antigone	15,000-17,500	VU	▼	Best estimate for number of mature individuals is 16,000. IUCN/BirdLife International place species in genus Grus.	
Rufous-sided crake	Laterallus melanophaius	16,700-66,700	LC	Steady	Total population is estimated to be 24,999-99,999 individuals.	
Red-fronted coot	Fulica rufifrons	16,700-66,700	LC	Steady	Total population is estimated to be 25,000-100,000 individuals.	
Red-and-white crake	Rufirallus leucopyrrhus	16,700-66,700	LC	Steady	Total population is estimated to be 25,000-100,000 individuals. IUCN/BirdLife International place species in genus Laterallus.	
Allen's gallinule	Porphyrio alleni	16,700-667,000	LC	?	Total population is estimated to be 25,000-1,000,000 individuals.	
Lesser moorhen	Paragallinula angulata	16,700-667,000	LC	▼	Total population is estimated to be 25,000-1,000,000 individuals.	
Blue crane	Grus paradisea	17,000-30,000	VU	▼	Total population is estimated to be 25,550-45,132 individuals. IUCN/BirdLife International give the binomial name Anthropoides paradiseus.	
Grey crowned crane	Balearica regulorum	20,100-24,600	EN	▼	Total population is estimated to be 30,200-36,900 individuals.	
African finfoot	Podica senegalensis	30,000-823,000	LC	?	Total population is estimated to be 45,002-1,235,000 individuals.	
Brolga	Antigone rubicunda	35,000-74,000	LC	Steady	Total population is estimated to be 52,000-110,000 individuals. IUCN/BirdLife International place species in genus Grus.	
Black crowned crane	Balearica pavonina	44,000-74,000	VU	▼	Total population is estimated to be 66,000-111,000 individuals.	
Russet-naped wood-rail	Aramides albiventris	50,000-499,999	LC	▼		
Rufous-necked wood-rail	Aramides axillaris	50,000-499,999	LC	▼		
Ocellated crake	Rufirallus schomburgkii	50,000-499,999	LC	▼	IUCN/BirdLife International place species in genus Micropygia.	
Uniform crake	Amaurolimnas concolor	50,000-499,999	LC	▼		
Paint-billed crake	Mustelirallus erythrops	50,000-499,999	LC	?	IUCN/BirdLife International place species in genus Neocrex.	
Ruddy crake	Laterallus ruber	50,000-499,999	LC	Steady		
Mangrove rail	Rallus longirostris	50,000-500,000	LC	▼		
Ash-throated crake	Mustelirallus albicollis	66,700-667,000	LC	Steady	Total population is estimated to be 99,999-999,999 individuals. IUCN/BirdLife International place species in genus Porzana.	
Giant wood-rail	Aramides ypecaha	66,700-667,000	LC	Steady	Total population is estimated to be 100,000-1,000,000 individuals.	
King rail	Rallus elegans	69,000	NT	▼		
Weka	Gallirallus australis	71,000-118,000	VU	▼	Total population is estimated to be 107,000-177,000 individuals.	
Spot-flanked gallinule	Porphyriops melanops	73,300-735,000	LC	Steady	Total population is estimated to be 110,001-1,102,500 individuals.	
Little crake	Zapornia parva	80,000-207,000	LC	?	Total population is estimated to be 120,000-310,000 individuals.	
White-winged trumpeter (Pale-winged trumpeter)	Psophia leucoptera	100,000-499,999	LC	▼	Some authorities, including IUCN/BirdLife International, split an additional species, the ochre-winged trumpeter, from this one. The IOC maintains ochre-winged trumpeter as a subspecies of the congeneric grey-winged trumpeter.	
Virginia rail	Rallus limicola	100,000-499,999	LC	Steady	Best estimate for number of mature individuals is 240,000. Note that IOC taxonomy splits an additional species, the Ecuadorian rail, from this species. IUCN/BirdLife International maintain both species within R.limicola.	
Purple gallinule (American purple gallinule)	Porphyrio martinicus	100,000-499,999	LC	Steady	Best estimate for number of mature individuals is 390,000.	
Red-knobbed coot	Fulica cristata	171,000-541,000	LC	▲	Total population is estimated to be 257,000-811,000 individuals. European subpopulation is considered critically endangered.	
Watercock	Gallicrex cinerea	> 201,000	LC	▼	IUCN/BirdLife International do not report an estimate; however, given the reported "c. 100,000 breeding pairs and c. 1,000 individuals on migration in Taiwan" a minimum value can be intuited.	
Clapper rail	Rallus crepitans	210,000	LC	▼	IUCN/BirdLife International do not report a population estimate, citing recent taxonomic splits. Estimate is available through Partners in Flight.	
Spotted crake	Porzana porzana	213,000-307,000	LC	▼	Total population is estimated to be 320,000-460,000 individuals.	
Demoiselle crane	Grus virgo	230,000-261,000	LC	▲	Values given are for total population. IUCN/BirdLife International place species in genus Anthropoides.	
Sandhill crane	Antigone canadensis	450,000-550,000	LC	▲	Total population is estimated to be 670,000-830,000 individuals. IUCN/BirdLife International place this species in genus Grus.	
Common crane	Grus grus	479,000-572,000	LC	▲	Total population is estimated to be 718,160-858,240 individuals.	
Baillon's crake	Zapornia pusilla	500,000-999,999	LC	?		
Sungrebe	Heliornis fulica	500,000-4,999,999	LC	▼		
Grey-breasted crake	Laterallus exilis	500,000-4,999,999	LC	▼		
White-throated crake	Laterallus albigularis	500,000-4,999,999	LC	Steady		
Purple swamphen (Western swamphen)	Porphyrio porphyrio	520,000-1,940,000	LC	?	Total population is estimated to be 779,996-2,909,994 individuals. Note that IOC taxonomy splits five additional species, the African swamphen, grey-headed swamphen, black-backed swamphen, Philippine swamphen, and Australasian swamphen from this species. IUCN/BirdLife International maintain all species within P. porphyrio.	
Western water rail (Water rail)	Rallus aquaticus	628,000-1,300,000	LC	?		
Red-gartered coot	Fulica armillata	667,000	LC	?	Total population is estimated to be 1.0 million individuals.	
White-winged coot	Fulica leucoptera	667,000	LC	Steady	Total population is estimated to be 1.0 million individuals.	
Black crake	Zapornia flavirostra	667,000	LC	Steady	Total population is estimated to be 1.0 million individuals.	
Limpkin	Aramus guarauna	672,000-687,000	LC	Steady	Total population is estimated to be 1,008,749-1,029,799 individuals.	
Plumbeous rail	Pardirallus sanguinolentus	683,000-1,340,000	LC	Steady	Total population is estimated to be 1,024,998-2,009,998 individuals.	
Sora	Porzana carolina	1,000,000-9,999,999	LC	Steady	Best estimate for number of mature individuals is 4.4 million.	
Common gallinule	Gallinula galeata	1,000,000-9,999,999	LC	?	Best estimate for number of mature individuals is 5.1 million.	
Corncrake	Crex crex	3,270,000-5,270,000	LC	▼	Total population is estimated to be 4.9-7.9 million individuals.	
Grey-cowled wood-rail	Aramides cajaneus	5,000,000-50,000,000	LC	Steady		
Eurasian coot	Fulica atra	5,300,000-6,500,000	LC	▲	Total population is estimated to be 7.95-9.75 million individuals.	
American coot	Fulica americana	7,100,000	LC	▼		
Common moorhen	Gallinula chloropus	9,069,000-13,527,000	LC	▼		

== Species without population estimates ==
Common name	Binomial name	Population	Status	Trend	Notes	Image
Brown-banded rail (Luzon rail)	Lewinia mirifica	unknown	DD	?	Species is only known from a handful of records; not enough data to make an assessment of status or population.	
Colombian crake	Mustelirallus colombianus	unknown	DD	?	Range has not been completely identified, and too few observations exist to make an assessment of status or population. IUCN/BirdLife International place species in genus Neocrex.	
Snoring rail	Aramidopsis plateni	unknown	VU	▼		
Invisible rail	Habroptila wallacii	unknown	VU	▼		
Green-winged trumpeter (Dark-winged trumpeter)	Psophia viridis	unknown	VU	▼	Some authorities, including IUCN/BirdLife International, split an additional two species from this one: black-winged trumpeter (in the table above) and olive-winged trumpeter (IUCN-EN), whose population has not been quantified. The IOC maintains all three species within P. viridis.	
Band-bellied crake	Zapornia paykullii	unknown	NT	▼		
Isabelline bush-hen	Amaurornis isabellina	unknown	LC	?		
Pale-vented bush-hen	Amaurornis moluccana	unknown	LC	?		
Philippine bush-hen (Plain bush-hen)	Amaurornis olivacea	unknown	LC	?		
White-breasted waterhen	Amaurornis phoenicurus	unknown	LC	?		
Red-winged wood-rail	Aramides calopterus	unknown	LC	?		
Little wood-rail	Aramides mangle	unknown	LC	?		
Grey-throated rail	Canirallus oculeus	unknown	LC	▼		
Swinhoe's rail	Coturnicops exquisitus	unknown	LC	▼		
Chestnut rail	Eulabeornis castaneoventris	unknown	LC	?		
Andean coot	Fulica ardesiaca	unknown	LC	?		
Dusky moorhen	Gallinula tenebrosa	unknown	LC	?		
Blue-faced rail	Gymnocrex rosenbergii	unknown	LC	▼	Population size is unknown, but it is not expected to be small.	
Bare-eyed rail	Gymnocrex plumbeiventris	unknown	LC	?		
Nkulengu rail	Himantornis haematopus	unknown	LC	▼		
Barred rail	Hypotaenidia torquata	unknown	LC	?		
Guadalcanal rail (Woodford's rail)	Hypotaenidia woodfordi	unknown	LC	?	Population was previously estimated to be 2,500-9,999 mature individuals, but this was not based on any data. Current population is unknown pending surveys.	
Lewin's rail	Lewinia pectoralis	unknown	LC	?		
Slaty-breasted rail	Lewinia striata	unknown	LC	?		
New Guinea flightless rail	Megacrex inepta	unknown	LC	▼		
Madagascar forest rail	Mentocrex kioloides	unknown	LC	▼	Population was previously estimated to be 1,000-2,000 individuals, but this is likely a large underestimate. Population is now considered unknown, pending more data.	
White-browed crake	Poliolimnas cinereus	unknown	LC	?	IUCN/BirdLife International give the binomial name Amaurornis cinerea.	
Australian crake	Porzana fluminea	unknown	LC	?		
Grey-winged trumpeter	Psophia crepitans	unknown	LC	▼		
Forbes's forest rail	Rallicula forbesi	unknown	LC	?		
White-striped forest rail	Rallicula leucospila	unknown	LC	▼		
Mayr's forest rail	Rallicula mayri	unknown	LC	Steady		
Chestnut forest rail	Rallicula rubra	unknown	LC	?		
Slaty-legged crake	Rallina eurizonoides	unknown	LC	▼		
Red-legged crake	Rallina fasciata	unknown	LC	?		
Red-necked crake	Rallina tricolor	unknown	LC	?		
African rail	Rallus caerulescens	unknown	LC	?		
Eastern water rail (Brown-cheeked rail)	Rallus indicus	unknown	LC	?		
Chestnut-headed crake	Rufirallus castaneiceps	unknown	LC	?		
Black-banded crake	Rufirallus fasciatus	unknown	LC	?	IUCN/BirdLife International give the binomial name Porzana fasciata.	
Russet-crowned crake	Rufirallus viridis	unknown	LC	?		
Striped flufftail	Sarothrura affinis	unknown	LC	▼		
Streaky-breasted flufftail	Sarothrura boehmi	unknown	LC	?	Population has not been quantified due to the cryptic nature of the species, but population is not expected to be small.	
Buff-spotted flufftail	Sarothrura elegans	unknown	LC	?		
White-spotted flufftail	Sarothrura pulchra	unknown	LC	▼		
Red-chested flufftail	Sarothrura rufa	unknown	LC	▼		
Tasmanian native-hen	Tribonyx mortierii	unknown	LC	?		
Brown crake	Zapornia akool	unknown	LC	?		
Black-tailed crake	Zapornia bicolor	unknown	LC	?		
Ruddy-breasted crake	Zapornia fusca	unknown	LC	?		
Spotless crake	Zapornia tabuensis	unknown	LC	?		

== See also ==
- Lists of birds by population
- Lists of organisms by population
