= List of rail species =

The avian family Rallidae comprise the rails, crakes, and coots. The AviList team recognizes these 148 species distributed among 38 genera, 19 of which have only one species. Nineteen of the species in the list have gone extinct since A.D. 1500; they are marked (Extinct).

This list is presented according to the Avilist taxonomic sequence and can also be sorted alphabetically by common name and binomial.

== List ==
Common name	Binomial name	AviList sequence
Chestnut-headed crake	Anurolimnas castaneiceps (Sclater, PL & Salvin, O, 1869)	1
Spotted rail	Pardirallus maculatus (Boddaert, P, 1783)	2
Blackish rail	Pardirallus nigricans (Vieillot, LJP, 1819)	3
Plumbeous rail	Pardirallus sanguinolentus (Swainson, WJ, 1838)	4
Ash-throated crake	Mustelirallus albicollis (Vieillot, LJP, 1819)	5
Zapata rail	Mustelirallus cerverai (Barbour, T & Peters, JL, 1927)	6
Colombian crake	Mustelirallus colombianus (Bangs, O, 1898)	7
Paint-billed crake	Mustelirallus erythrops (Sclater, PL, 1867)	8
Uniform crake	Amaurolimnas concolor (Gosse, PH, 1847)	9
Giant wood rail	Aramides ypecaha (Vieillot, LJP, 1819)	10
Brown wood rail	Aramides wolfi Berlepsch, HHCL & Taczanowski, W, 1884	11
Little wood rail	Aramides mangle (Spix, JB, 1825)	12
Rufous-necked wood rail	Aramides axillaris Lawrence, GN, 1863	13
Russet-naped wood rail	Aramides albiventris Lawrence, GN, 1868	14
Grey-cowled wood rail	Aramides cajaneus (Müller, PLS, 1776)	15
Red-winged wood rail	Aramides calopterus Sclater, PL & Salvin, O, 1878	16
Slaty-breasted wood rail	Aramides saracura (Spix, JB, 1825)	17
Grey-throated rail	Canirallus oculeus (Hartlaub, KJG, 1855)	18
Ridgway's rail	Rallus obsoletus Ridgway, R, 1874	19
Aztec rail	Rallus tenuirostris Ridgway, R, 1874	20
Mangrove rail	Rallus longirostris Boddaert, P, 1783	21
King rail	Rallus elegans Audubon, JJ, 1834	22
Clapper rail	Rallus crepitans Gmelin, JF, 1789	23
Plain-flanked rail	Rallus wetmorei Zimmer, JT & Phelps, WH Sr, 1944	24
Virginia rail	Rallus limicola Vieillot, LJP, 1819	25
Ecuadorian rail	Rallus aequatorialis Sharpe, RB, 1894	26
Bogota rail	Rallus semiplumbeus Sclater, PL, 1856	27
Austral rail	Rallus antarcticus King, PP, 1828	28
Water rail	Rallus aquaticus Linnaeus, C, 1758	29
Brown-cheeked rail	Rallus indicus Blyth, E, 1849	30
African rail	Rallus caerulescens Gmelin, JF, 1789	31
Madagascar rail	Rallus madagascariensis Verreaux, JP, 1833	32
Rouget's rail	Rougetius rougetii (Guérin-Méneville, FÉ, 1843)	33
African crake	Crecopsis egregia (Peters, WKH, 1854)	34
Reunion rail	Dryolimnas augusti Mourer-Chauviré, C, Bour, R, Ribes, S & Moutou, F, 1999 (Extinct)	35
White-throated rail	Dryolimnas cuvieri (Pucheran, J, 1845)	36
Red rail	Aphanapteryx bonasia (de Sélys Longchamps, ME, 1848) (Extinct)	37
Rodrigues rail	Erythromachus leguati Milne-Edwards, A, 1873 (Extinct)	38
Hawkins's rail	Diaphorapteryx hawkinsi (Forbes, HO, 1892) (Extinct)	39
St. Helena rail	Aphanocrex podarces Wetmore, A, 1963 (Extinct)	40
Ascension crake	Mundia elpenor (Olson, SL, 1973) (Extinct)	41
Corn crake	Crex crex (Linnaeus, C, 1758)	42
Snoring rail	Aramidopsis plateni (Blasius, W, 1886)	43
Slaty-breasted rail	Lewinia striata (Linnaeus, C, 1766)	44
Brown-banded rail	Lewinia mirifica (Parkes, KC & Amadon, DA, 1959)	45
Lewin's rail	Lewinia pectoralis (Temminck, CJ, 1831)	46
Auckland rail	Lewinia muelleri (Rothschild, LW, 1893)	47
Calayan rail	Gallirallus calayanensis Allen, DNS, Oliveros, CH, Española, C, Broad, G & Gonzalez, JCT, 2004	48
Invisible rail	Gallirallus wallacii (Gray, GR, 1861)	49
Chestnut rail	Gallirallus castaneoventris (Gould, J, 1844)	50
Weka	Gallirallus australis (Sparrman, A, 1786)	51
New Caledonian rail	Gallirallus lafresnayanus Verreaux, JP & des Murs, MAPO, 1860	52
Lord Howe woodhen	Gallirallus sylvestris (Sclater, PL, 1870)	53
Okinawa rail	Gallirallus okinawae (Yamashina, Y & Mano, T, 1981)	54
Tahiti rail	Gallirallus pacificus (Gmelin, JF, 1789) (Extinct)	55
Buff-banded rail	Gallirallus philippensis (Linnaeus, C, 1766)	56
Chatham rail	Gallirallus modestus (Hutton, FW, 1872) (Extinct)	57
Dieffenbach's rail	Gallirallus dieffenbachii (Gray, GR, 1843) (Extinct)	58
Pink-legged rail	Gallirallus insignis (Sclater, PL, 1880)	59
Woodford's rail	Gallirallus woodfordi (Ogilvie-Grant, WR, 1889)	60
Bar-winged rail	Gallirallus poecilopterus (Hartlaub, KJG, 1866) (Extinct)	61
Guam rail	Gallirallus owstoni (Rothschild, LW, 1895)	62
Wake Island rail	Gallirallus wakensis (Rothschild, LW, 1903) (Extinct)	63
Barred rail	Gallirallus torquatus (Linnaeus, C, 1766)	64
Roviana rail	Gallirallus rovianae Diamond, JM, 1991	65
Nkulengu rail	Himantornis haematopus Hartlaub, KJG, 1855	66
Blue-faced rail	Gymnocrex rosenbergii (Schlegel, H, 1866)	67
Bare-eyed rail	Gymnocrex plumbeiventris (Gray, GR, 1862)	68
Talaud rail	Gymnocrex talaudensis Lambert, FR, 1998	69
Spot-flanked gallinule	Porphyriops melanops (Vieillot, LJP, 1819)	70
Black-tailed nativehen	Tribonyx ventralis (Gould, J, 1837)	71
Tasmanian nativehen	Tribonyx mortierii Du Bus de Gisignies, B-AL, 1840	72
Sora	Porzana carolina (Linnaeus, C, 1758)	73
Spotted crake	Porzana porzana (Linnaeus, C, 1766)	74
Australian crake	Porzana fluminea Gould, J, 1843	75
Lesser moorhen	Paragallinula angulata (Sundevall, CJ, 1850)	76
Makira woodhen	Gallinula silvestris (Mayr, E, 1933)	77
Tristan moorhen	Gallinula nesiotis Sclater, PL, 1861 (Extinct)	78
Gough moorhen	Gallinula comeri (Allen, JA, 1892)	79
Common moorhen	Gallinula chloropus (Linnaeus, C, 1758)	80
Common gallinule	Gallinula galeata (Lichtenstein, MHC, 1818)	81
Dusky moorhen	Gallinula tenebrosa Gould, J, 1846	82
Samoan woodhen	Gallinula pacifica (Hartlaub, KJG & Finsch, FHO, 1871)	83
Red-fronted coot	Fulica rufifrons Philippi, RA & Landbeck, CL, 1861	84
Horned coot	Fulica cornuta Bonaparte, CLJL, 1853	85
Red-gartered coot	Fulica armillata Vieillot, LJP, 1817	86
Giant coot	Fulica gigantea Eydoux, JFT & Souleyet, LFA, 1841	87
Eurasian coot	Fulica atra Linnaeus, C, 1758	88
Red-knobbed coot	Fulica cristata Gmelin, JF, 1789	89
Mascarene coot	Fulica newtonii Milne-Edwards, A, 1867 (Extinct)	90
Hawaiian coot	Fulica alai Peale, TR, 1849	91
American coot	Fulica americana Gmelin, JF, 1789	92
White-winged coot	Fulica leucoptera Vieillot, LJP, 1817	93
Andean coot	Fulica ardesiaca Tschudi, JJ, 1843	94
Allen's gallinule	Porphyrio alleni Thomson, TRH, 1842	95
Purple gallinule	Porphyrio martinica (Linnaeus, C, 1766)	96
Azure gallinule	Porphyrio flavirostris (Gmelin, JF, 1789)	97
Marquesan swamphen	Porphyrio paepae Steadman, DW, 1988 (Extinct)	98
Purple swamphen	Porphyrio porphyrio (Linnaeus, C, 1758)	99
South Island takahe	Porphyrio hochstetteri (Meyer, AB, 1883)	100
White swamphen	Porphyrio albus (Shaw, G, 1790) (Extinct)	101
North Island takahe	Porphyrio mantelli (Owen, R, 1848) (Extinct)	102
Ocellated crake	Rufirallus schomburgkii (Schomburgk, MR, 1848)	103
Russet-crowned crake	Rufirallus viridis (Müller, PLS, 1776)	104
Black-banded crake	Rufirallus fasciatus (Sclater, PL & Salvin, O, 1868)	105
Red-and-white crake	Rufirallus leucopyrrhus (Vieillot, LJP, 1819)	106
Rufous-faced crake	Rufirallus xenopterus (Conover, HB, 1934)	107
Swinhoe's rail	Coturnicops exquisitus (Swinhoe, R, 1873)	108
Yellow rail	Coturnicops noveboracensis (Gmelin, JF, 1789)	109
Inaccessible Island rail	Laterallus rogersi (Lowe, PR, 1923)	110
Speckled rail	Laterallus notatus (Gould, J, 1841)	111
Yellow-breasted crake	Laterallus flaviventer (Boddaert, P, 1783)	112
Rusty-flanked crake	Laterallus levraudi (Sclater, PL & Salvin, O, 1869)	113
Rufous-sided crake	Laterallus melanophaius (Vieillot, LJP, 1819)	114
Ruddy crake	Laterallus ruber (Sclater, PL & Salvin, O, 1860)	115
White-throated crake	Laterallus albigularis (Lawrence, GN, 1861)	116
Grey-breasted crake	Laterallus exilis (Temminck, CJ, 1831)	117
Galapagos crake	Laterallus spilonota (Gould, J, 1841)	118
Black rail	Laterallus jamaicensis (Gmelin, JF, 1789)	119
Dot-winged crake	Laterallus spiloptera (Durnford, H, 1877)	120
White-browed crake	Poliolimnas cinereus (Vieillot, LJP, 1819)	121
New Guinea flightless rail	Megacrex inepta d'Albertis, LM & Salvadori, AT, 1879	122
Striped crake	Aenigmatolimnas marginalis (Hartlaub, KJG, 1857)	123
Watercock	Gallicrex cinerea (Gmelin, JF, 1789)	124
Isabelline bush-hen	Amaurornis isabellina (Schlegel, H, 1865)	125
Plain bush-hen	Amaurornis olivacea (Meyen, FJF, 1834)	126
White-breasted waterhen	Amaurornis phoenicurus (Pennant, T, 1769)	127
Talaud bush-hen	Amaurornis magnirostris Lambert, FR, 1998	128
Pale-vented bush-hen	Amaurornis moluccana (Wallace, AR, 1865)	129
Red-necked crake	Rallina tricolor Gray, GR, 1858	130
Andaman crake	Rallina canningi (Blyth, E, 1863)	131
Red-legged crake	Rallina fasciata (Raffles, TS, 1822)	132
Slaty-legged crake	Rallina eurizonoides (de Lafresnaye, NFAA, 1845)	133
Ruddy-breasted crake	Zapornia fusca (Linnaeus, C, 1766)	134
Band-bellied crake	Zapornia paykullii (Ljungh, SI, 1813)	135
Brown crake	Zapornia akool (Sykes, WH, 1832)	136
Black crake	Zapornia flavirostra (Swainson, WJ, 1837)	137
Little crake	Zapornia parva (Scopoli, GA, 1769)	138
Baillon's crake	Zapornia pusilla (Pallas, PS, 1776)	139
St. Helena crake	Zapornia astrictocarpus (Olson, SL, 1975) (Extinct)	140
Laysan rail	Zapornia palmeri (Frohawk, FW, 1892) (Extinct)	141
Sakalava rail	Zapornia olivieri (Grandidier, G & Berlioz, J, 1929)	142
Black-tailed crake	Zapornia bicolor (Walden, A, 1872)	143
Hawaiian rail	Zapornia sandwichensis (Gmelin, JF, 1789) (Extinct)	144
Tahiti crake	Zapornia nigra (Miller, JF, 1784) (Extinct)	145
Henderson crake	Zapornia atra (North, AJ, 1908)	146
Spotless crake	Zapornia tabuensis (Gmelin, JF, 1789)	147
Kosrae crake	Zapornia monasa (Kittlitz, FH, 1858) (Extinct)	148
