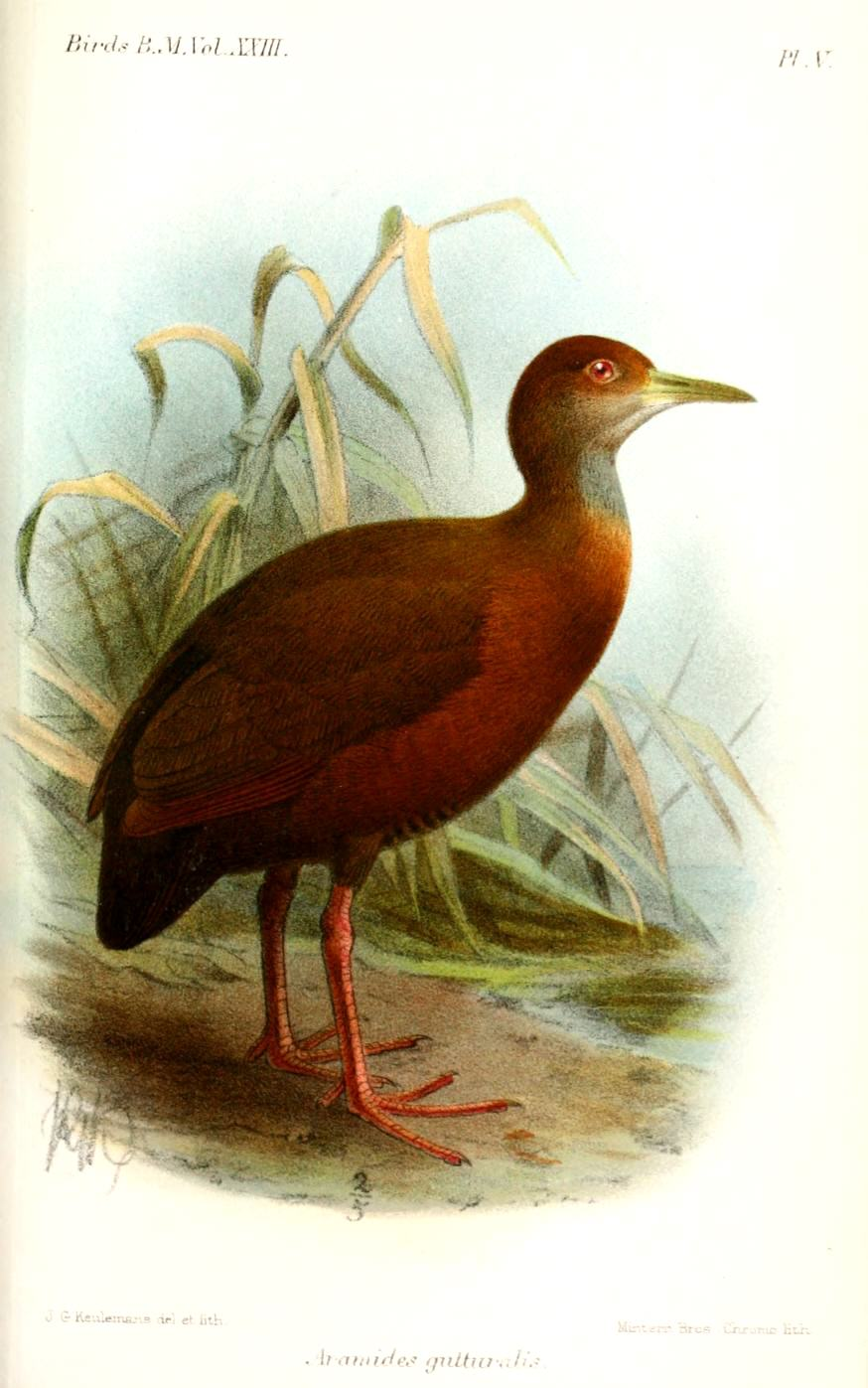
- Illustration by Keulemans, 1894

Conservation status
- Extinct (20th century?)

Scientific classification
- Kingdom: Animalia
- Phylum: Chordata
- Class: Aves
- Order: Gruiformes
- Family: Rallidae
- Genus: Aramides
- Species: †A. gutturalis

Binomial name
- †Aramides gutturalis Sharpe, 1894

Synonyms
- Aramides guttaralis Sharpe, 1894 (lapsus)

= Red-throated wood rail =

Extinct species of bird

The red-throated wood rail (Aramides gutturalis) is a disputed species of bird in the family Rallidae. If it is not a misidentification, it was endemic to Peru and apparently became extinct due to habitat loss some time in the 20th century.

Following the 2006 SACC assessment which listed this species as dubious taxon BirdLife International removed the red-throated wood rail from the list of extinct species in 2009 as it might be either a badly prepared specimen of the grey-cowled wood rail A. cajanea or a subspecies of the brown wood rail A. wolfi.
