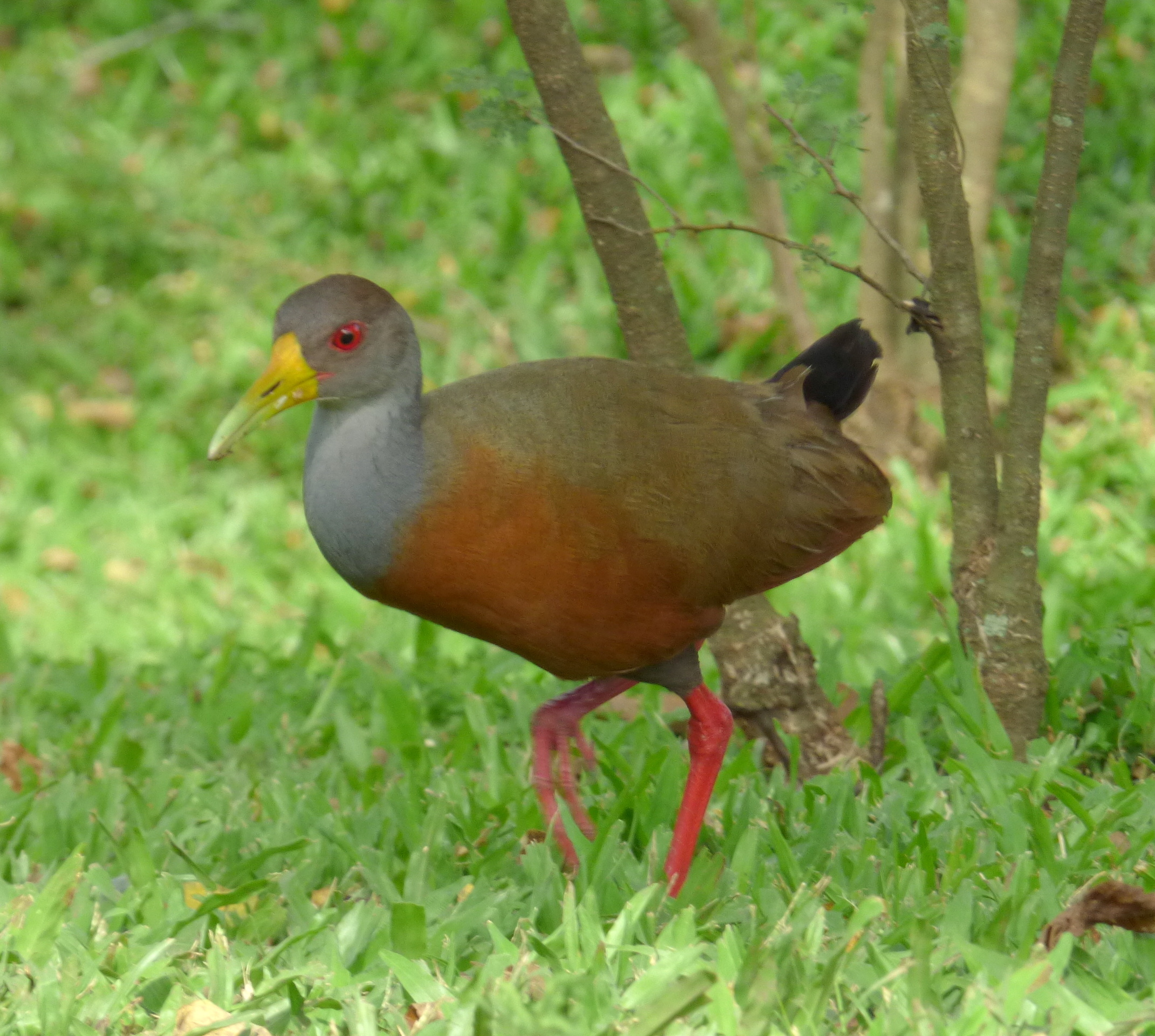
- Grey-cowled wood rail

Conservation status
- Least Concern (IUCN 3.1)

Scientific classification
- Kingdom: Animalia
- Phylum: Chordata
- Class: Aves
- Order: Gruiformes
- Family: Rallidae
- Genus: Aramides
- Species: A. cajaneus

Binomial name
- Aramides cajaneus (Müller, 1776)

Subspecies
- See text
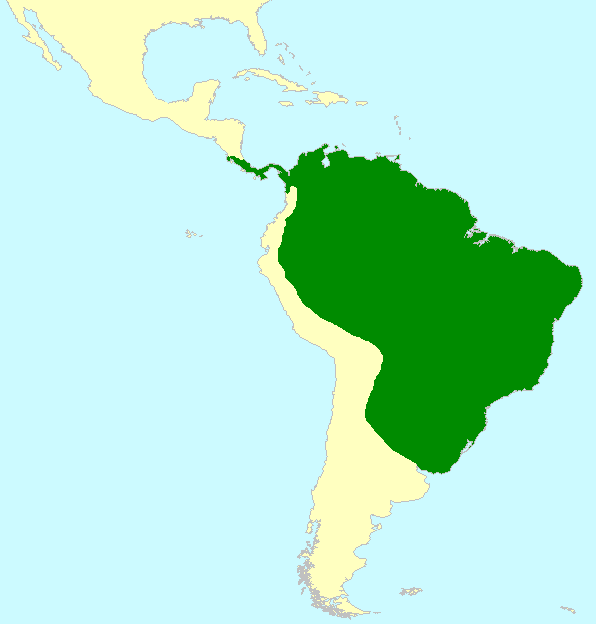

Synonyms
- List: Aramides cajanea; Aramides plumbeicollis; Aramides chiricote; Rallus chiricote

= Grey-cowled wood rail =

Bird in the family Rallidae from Central and South America

The grey-cowled wood rail or grey-necked wood rail (Aramides cajaneus; also gray-) is a species of bird in the family Rallidae, the rails. It lives primarily in the forests, mangroves, and swamps of Central and South America. Of the two subspecies, A. c. avicenniae is found in southeastern Brazil, while the nominate is found throughout the portion of the range not occupied by the other subspecies. The species as a whole is usually found at elevations from sea level to 2,000 metres (6,600 ft), although some have been found above that. This bird's large range, along with its significant population, is why it is considered to be least-concern by the International Union for Conservation of Nature (IUCN). In some places, it is occasionally hunted and kept for food.

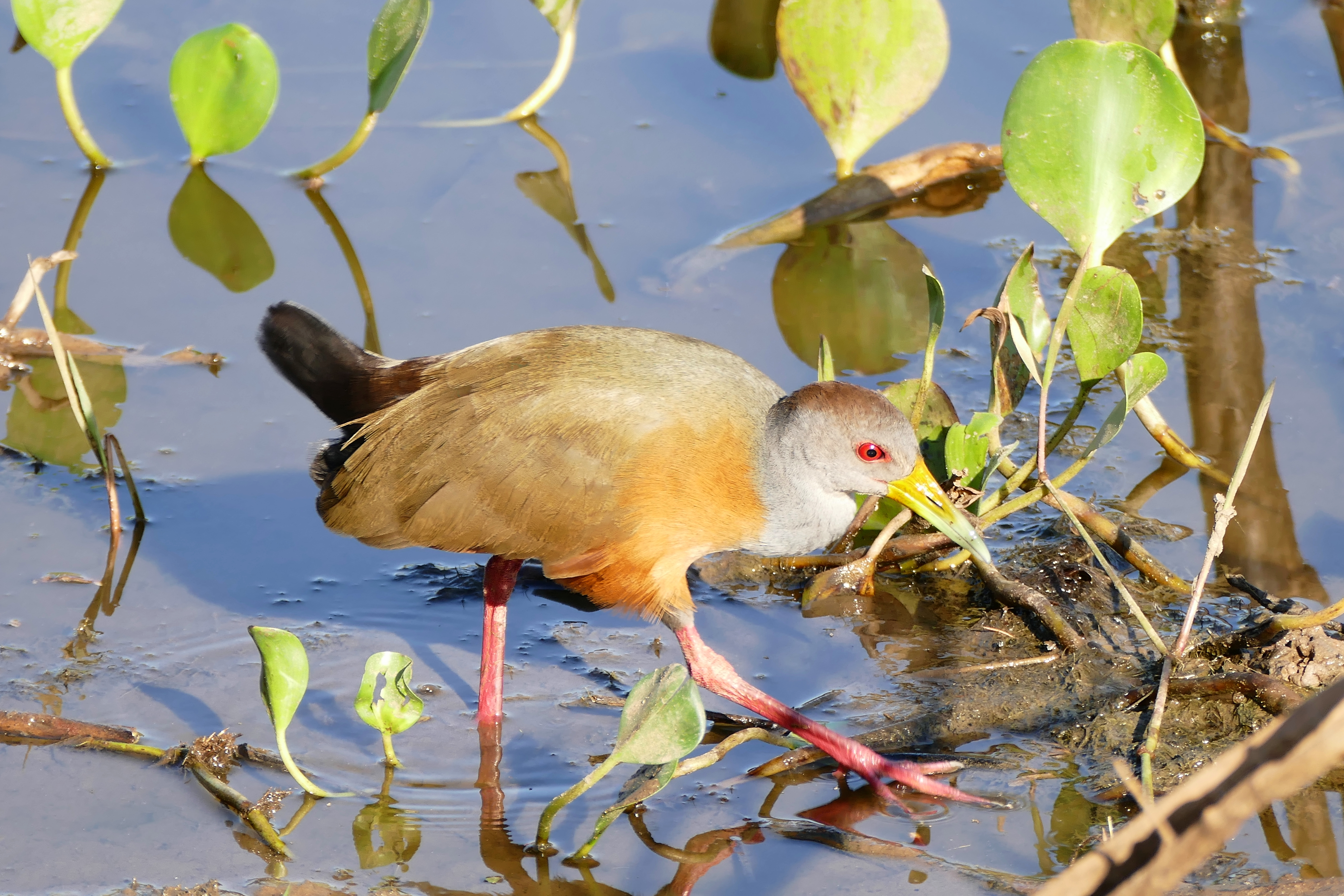
bird

This bird, large for a wood rail, has both a grey head and neck. In the nominate, the back of the head has a brown patch. The upperparts are olive-green to dark brown. The chest and flanks are a rufous colour, with the belly, rump, and tail being black. The legs are coral-red, the bill is a bright greenish-yellow, and the eyes are red. The sexes are similar. The juveniles can be differentiated by their duller look, and the chicks have a black, downy appearance, brown head, and black beak. The subspecies A. c. avicenniae can be differentiated by its smaller size, lack of a brown patch at the back of the neck, and its lower back being toned slightly olive. The underparts are also pale.

The bird is monogamous; pairs can be found together throughout the year. During the breeding season, which usually lasts from March to August, the grey-cowled wood rail builds nests that can be found on flat branches and in thickets, usually at heights between 1 and 3 metres (3 and 10 ft). In these nests, there is a clutch consisting of three to seven eggs, incubated by both sexes. The chicks that hatch are precocial, able to move soon after hatching. This rail feeds on a wide range of foods, from molluscs to seeds. It is also known to feed on the faeces of giant otters.

== Taxonomy and etymology ==
Placed in the family Rallidae (rails, moorhens, coots and allies), this species was originally described as Fulica cajanea by Philipp Ludwig Statius Müller, in his 1776 Vollständiges Natursystem. Müller based his description on the illustration Poule d'Eau de Cayenne (water hen of Cayenne) by the French naturalist and artist Edme-Louis Daubenton in his Planches Enlumineés d'Histoire Naturelle. It was eventually moved to the new genus Aramides, the wood rails, by Jacques Pucheran in 1845, and the specific epithet was changed to cajaneus.

The grey-cowled wood rail is regarded as being sister species with the russet-naped wood rail, one of the nine members of the genus Aramides, within which the grey-cowled wood rail is also included. The two were classified as subspecies of a single species by James L. Peters in the 1934 edition of his Check-list of Birds of the World, before being separated as species once more in 2015. The two rails have different calls and plumage with no gradation reported. The number of subspecies is contentious, some authorities accept up to nine, while others accept only two. It is even suggested that the subspecies A. c. avicenniae be split off as a full species, based on differences in morphology and calls, speculated to have arisen because the slaty-breasted wood rail acted as an ecological barrier between the two subspecies. The subspecies, according to the International Ornithologists' Union, are:

- Aramides cajaneus cajaneus (Müller, 1776) – from Costa Rica to Colombia, east through Venezuela and Trinidad to Brazil, and south to Northern Argentina and Uruguay
- A. c. avicenniae Stotz, 1992 – coastal southeastern Brazil

=== Etymology ===
The genus name Aramides is derived from the combination of the genus name Aramus and of the Greek oidēs, "resembling". This refers to the similarity between birds of the genus Aramides and the one species of the genus Aramus. The specific epithet, cajaneus, is in reference to Cayenne, the capital city of French Guiana. The subspecies epithet avicenniae honours the Persian philosopher Avicenna.

== Description ==
The grey-cowled wood rail usually measures 33–40 centimetres (13–16 in) long and weighs 320–465 grams (11.3–16.4 oz), particularly large for a wood rail. The upperparts are olive-green to dark brown. The head and neck are medium-grey, blending into a brown patch at the back of the head. The eyes are red. The chest and flanks are rufous. The belly, rump, and tail are black. The legs are coral-red, while the bill is a bright greenish-yellow. The males and females are similar.

Juvenile birds are similar to the adult but are duller in colour, with their belly sooty-black and flecked with buff. The juveniles also differ in that their bill and legs are dusky, and have brownish eyes. The chicks are black and downy, with a brownish head. Their dark eyes are lined with dull, reddish bare skin. The black bill has a flesh-coloured base, and a small, white egg tooth behind the tip of the upper mandible, as well as a very small one at the tip of the lower mandible.

The subspecies A. c. avicenniae differs from the nominate by its smaller size. It also varies as its nape to back is a dull grey colour. The brown spot present at the back of the head of the nominate is also reduced or gone. The lower back is toned a slight olive, and the underparts are also slightly paler than the nominate, but without white feathers. The upper wing coverts of A. c. avicenniae are also more greenish-grey. The similar but smaller rufous-necked wood rail can be differentiated from the grey-necked wood rail by the former's reddish head and neck with a grey upper back.

This bird moults its remiges simultaneously. This moult occurs during the months from March to June.

=== Voice ===
The grey-cowled wood rail has a loud, repetitive cackling call mainly heard at dawn and dusk: pop-tiyi pop-tiyi co-co-co-co-co or chitico chitico cao-cao-cao. These songs are often sung in a chorus or duet. The alarm call is a harsh, loud cackle or clucking shriek. The chitico chitico cao-cao-cao call made by this rail is similar to the brown wood rail's kui-ko call.

== Distribution and habitat ==
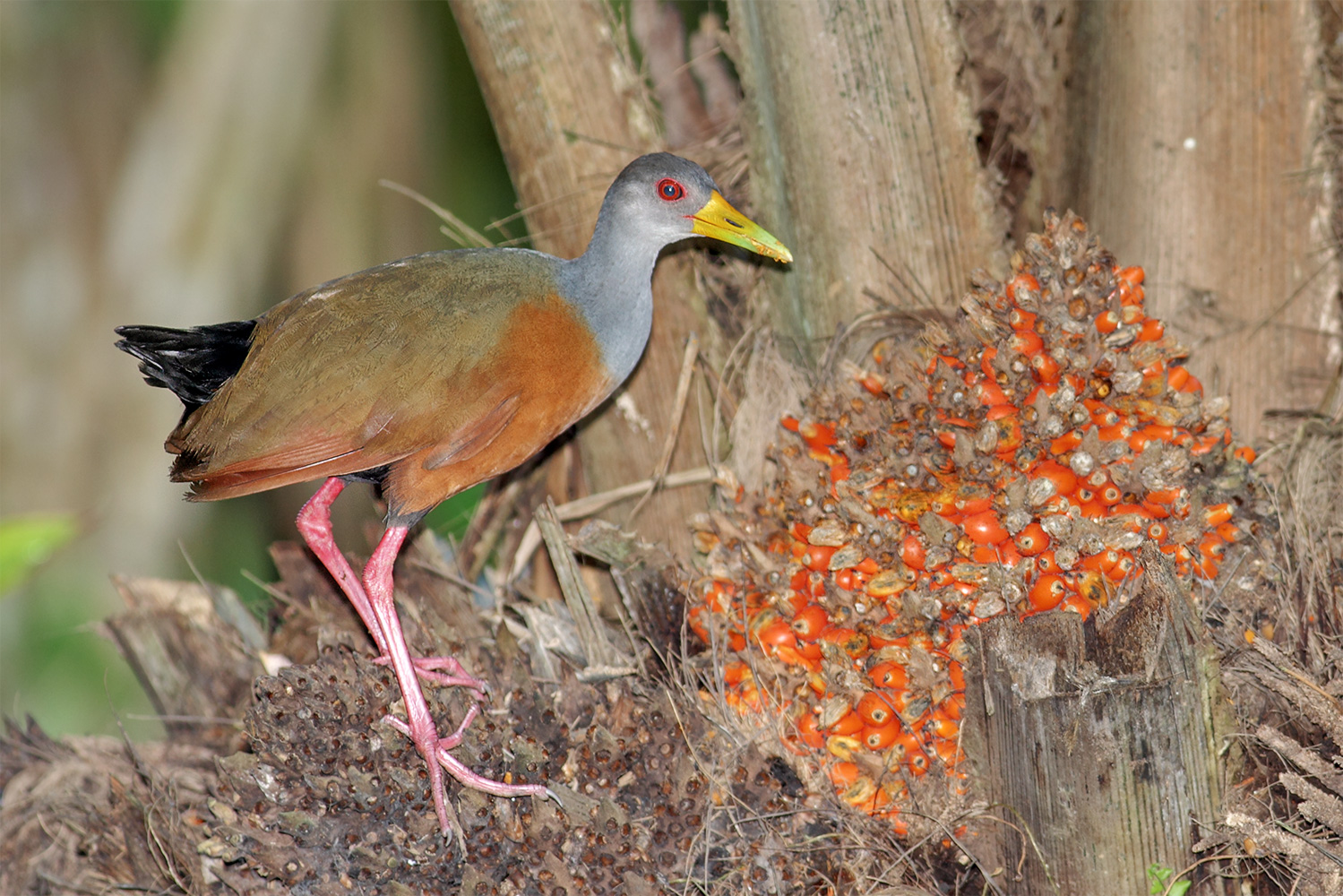
Nominate subspecies cajaneus in Costa Rica

The grey-cowled wood rail is found in Argentina, Bolivia, Brazil, Colombia, Costa Rica, Ecuador, French Guiana, Guyana, Panama, Paraguay, Peru, Suriname, Trinidad and Tobago, Uruguay, and Venezuela. The nominate subspecies is cut off by the Andes Mountains and lives east of the range in Ecuador, Peru, and Bolivia; it is not found in the southeastern interior of Brazil. The subspecies A. c. avicenniae is found in coastal southeastern Brazil, around São Paulo.

The grey-cowled wood rail's natural habitats are subtropical or tropical moist lowland forests, subtropical or tropical mangrove forests, and subtropical or tropical swamps. The subspecies A. c. avicenniae is however almost completely restricted to mangrove forests. The grey-cowled wood rail can be found from sea level to elevations around 2,000 metres (6,600 ft), although some wanderers have been recorded at elevations up to 2,300 metres (7,500 ft) in Colombia.

== Behaviour and ecology ==
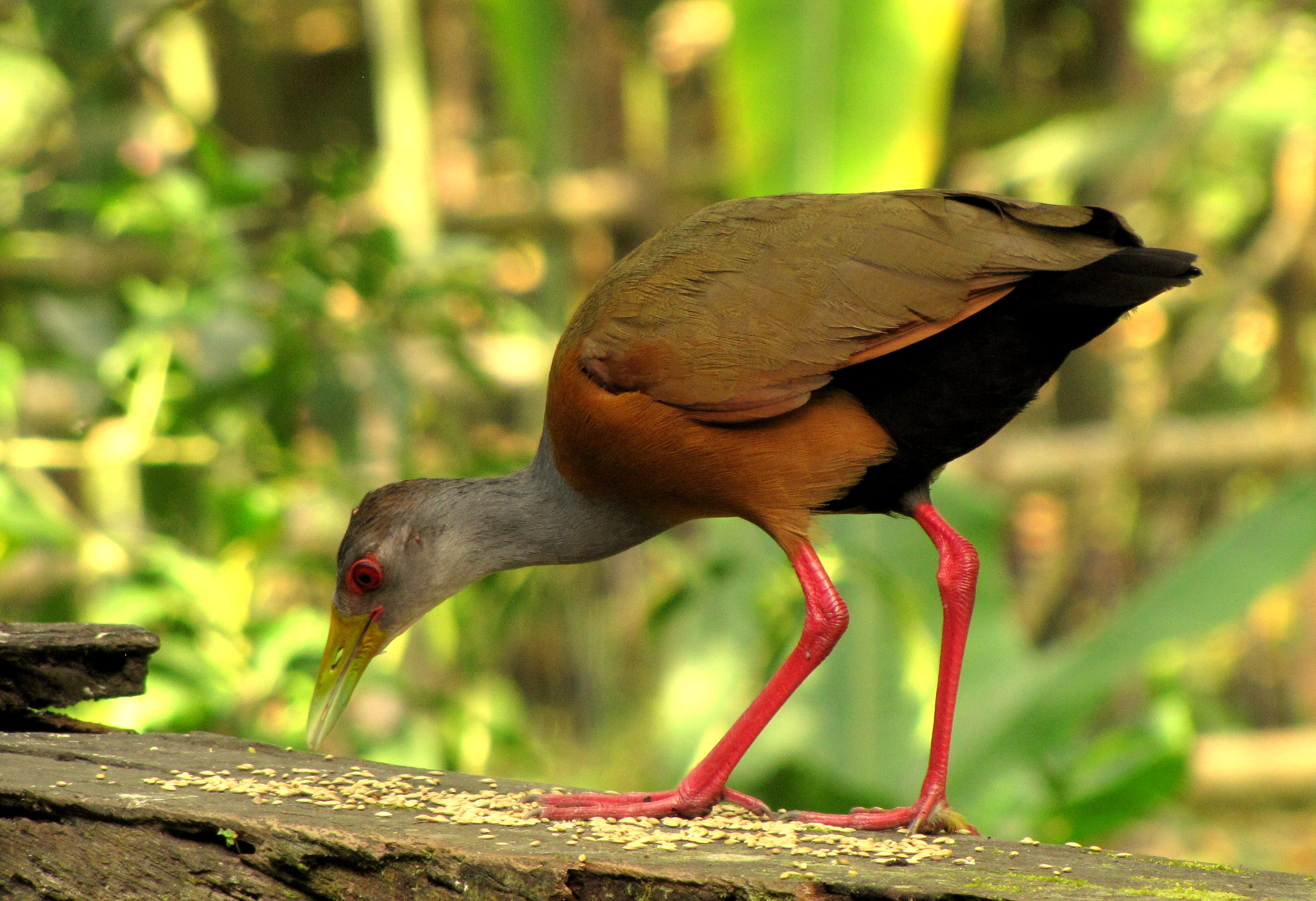
A grey-necked wood rail feeding on seeds

This bird can be seen to perch in both shrubbery and even trees, something characteristic of the forest rails. The grey-cowled wood rail rarely flies, although when it is flushed out, it will generally move to a branch close to the ground. If it is being observed, it is generally cautious.

=== Breeding ===
The grey-cowled wood rail's nests are situated in trees and bushes, usually 1 to 3 metres (3.3 to 9.8 ft) off the ground, built on flat branches or in thickets and lined with twigs and leaves. They generally have a diameter between 30 and 40 centimetres (12 and 16 in) on the outside, with an internal diameter of around 15 centimetres (5.9 in). The depth is usually between under 4 and 9 centimetres (1.6 and 3.5 in). The overall height of the nest is around 16 centimetres (6.3 in).

This bird is monogamous, forming long-lasting pair bonds, with pairs of grey-necked wood rails staying together throughout the year. Its breeding season usually occurs between March and August, although this varies depending on geography. In Costa Rica, the breeding season extends until September. In Mexico, on the other hand, the breeding season is known to start as early as January. In captivity, this wood rail is territorial.

The clutch the grey-cowled wood rail lays usually consists of three to seven brown-blotched, slightly glossy, whitish eggs, although clutches consisting of five eggs are most typical. These eggs usually measure around 52 by 36 millimetres (2.0 by 1.4 in) and weigh between 25.1 and 27.1 grams (0.89 and 0.96 oz). They are incubated by both sexes, each taking six to eight hour shifts, for around 20 days. In captivity, the male incubates during the day, and the female during the night. The chicks hatch precocial and are cared for by the parents for one or two days before leaving the nest, although chicks sometimes use the brood nest until they are 40 days old.

=== Feeding ===
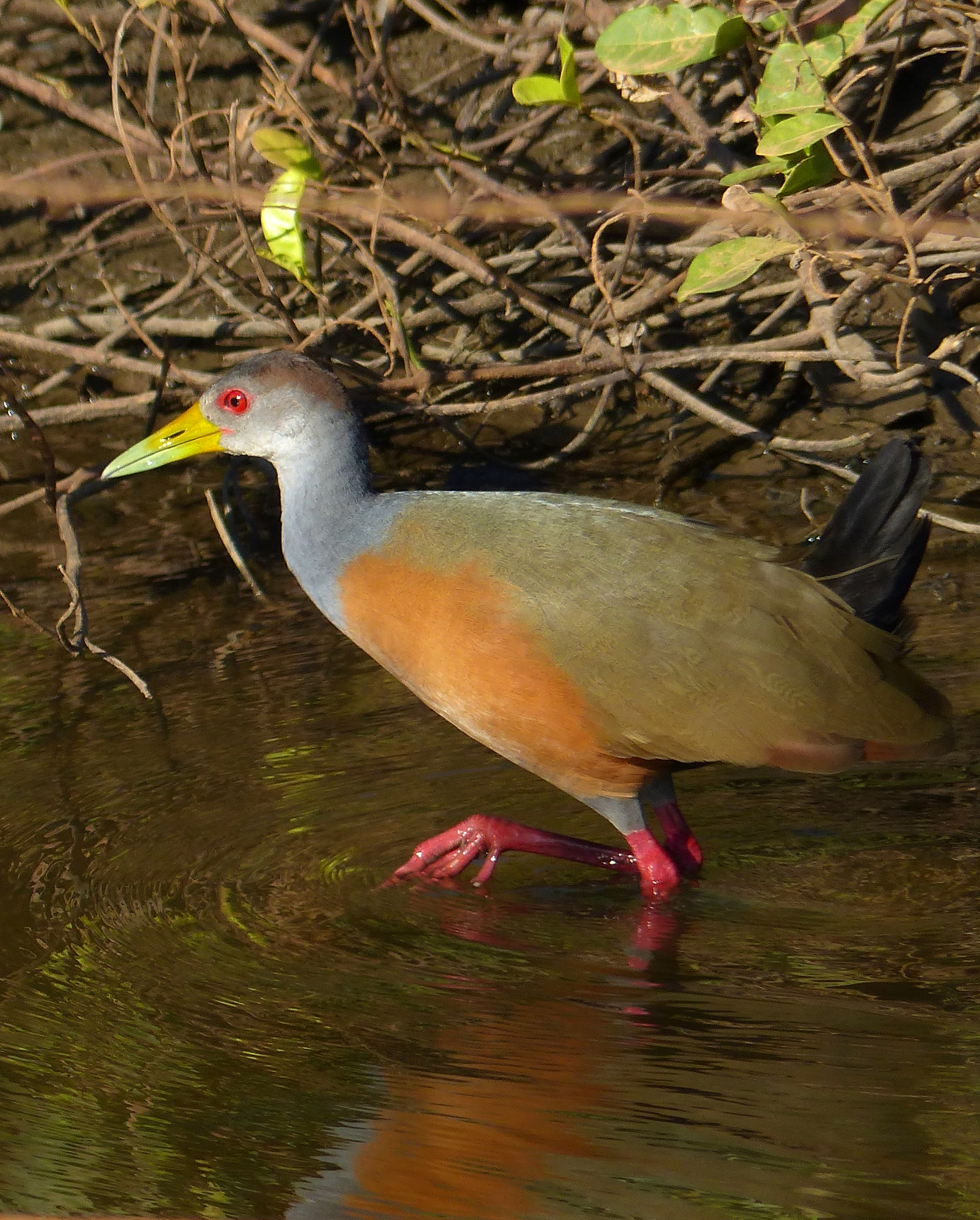
A wading grey-necked wood rail

This bird feeds at night, eating various invertebrates and small vertebrates. While in mangroves, it commonly feeds on crabs. Otherwise, it will generally feed on molluscs (such as snails, including Pomacea flagellata), arthropods, frogs, seeds, grains, leaves, berries, palm fruits, and the occasional water snake. Maize, rice, and bananas are also viable food items for the grey-necked wood rail. It is also known to feed on the feces of giant otters at latrines.

When eating snails, this rail will hammer at the shells to extract them. For berries, it will jump high to break off clusters of this fruit. After doing this, it will pick off the berries one by one and eat them. It uses its partially open bill to probe and move aside debris like leaf litter. It is generally wary and secretive, and selfish when mated. This manifests in warning its partner with threat displays to keep it at a distance. Even so, it has occasionally been seen to openly forage in short grass near thickets and in streams or muddy tracks.

=== Parasites ===
The grey-cowled wood rail is the type host of Plasmodium bertii, an apicomplexan parasite, meaning that P. bertii was originally discovered on this organism. P. lutzi is also found on this bird.

== Status ==
This rail is considered to be a least-concern species, according to the IUCN. The justification is this species' stable and large population, believed to be somewhere between five million and 50 million individuals. The grey-cowled wood rail also has a large extent of occurrence, estimated to cover 21.4 million square kilometres (8.3 million mi^{2}). It is common throughout its range, although it is adversely affected by destruction of its habitat.

=== Human interaction ===
The grey-cowled wood rail is occasionally hunted for food in northeast Brazil. They are usually hunted with baited fish hooks that are laid near the bodies of water where these birds forage. In the Las Minas District, Panama, this bird is also kept for food. Although it is generally cautious, it can tolerate an approach by humans up to about 10 metres (33 ft) away from it, after which it will retreat into the undergrowth.
