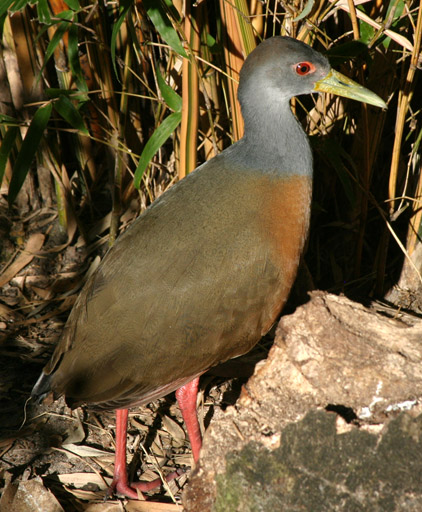
- Grey-cowled wood rail, Aramides cajaneus

Scientific classification
- Kingdom: Animalia
- Phylum: Chordata
- Class: Aves
- Order: Gruiformes
- Family: Rallidae
- Genus: Aramides; Pucheran, 1845

Type species
- Fulica cayennensis Gmelin, 1789

Species
- see text

= Aramides =

Genus of birds

Aramides is a genus of birds in the family Rallidae.

It contains the following 8 species:

Image	Common name	Scientific name	Distribution
	Little wood rail	Aramides mangle	Brazil.
	Rufous-necked wood rail	Aramides axillaris	Belize, Colombia, Costa Rica, Ecuador, El Salvador, French Guiana, Guyana, Honduras, Mexico, Nicaragua, Panama, Peru, Suriname, Trinidad and Tobago, and Venezuela.
	Grey-cowled wood rail	Aramides cajaneus	Argentina, Bolivia, Brazil, Colombia, Costa Rica, Ecuador, French Guiana, Guyana, Panama, Paraguay, Peru, Suriname, Trinidad and Tobago, Uruguay, and Venezuela.
	Russet-naped wood rail	Aramides albiventris	southern Mexico to Costa Rica.
	Brown wood rail	Aramides wolfi	Colombia, Ecuador, and possibly Peru.
	Giant wood rail	Aramides ypecaha	Argentina, Bolivia, Brazil, Paraguay, and Uruguay.
	Slaty-breasted wood rail	Aramides saracura	Brazil and eastern Paraguay.
	Red-winged wood rail	Aramides calopterus	Brazil, Ecuador and Peru.

There is also a doubtful species:

- Red-throated wood rail, Aramides gutturalis - extinct (20th century?)
