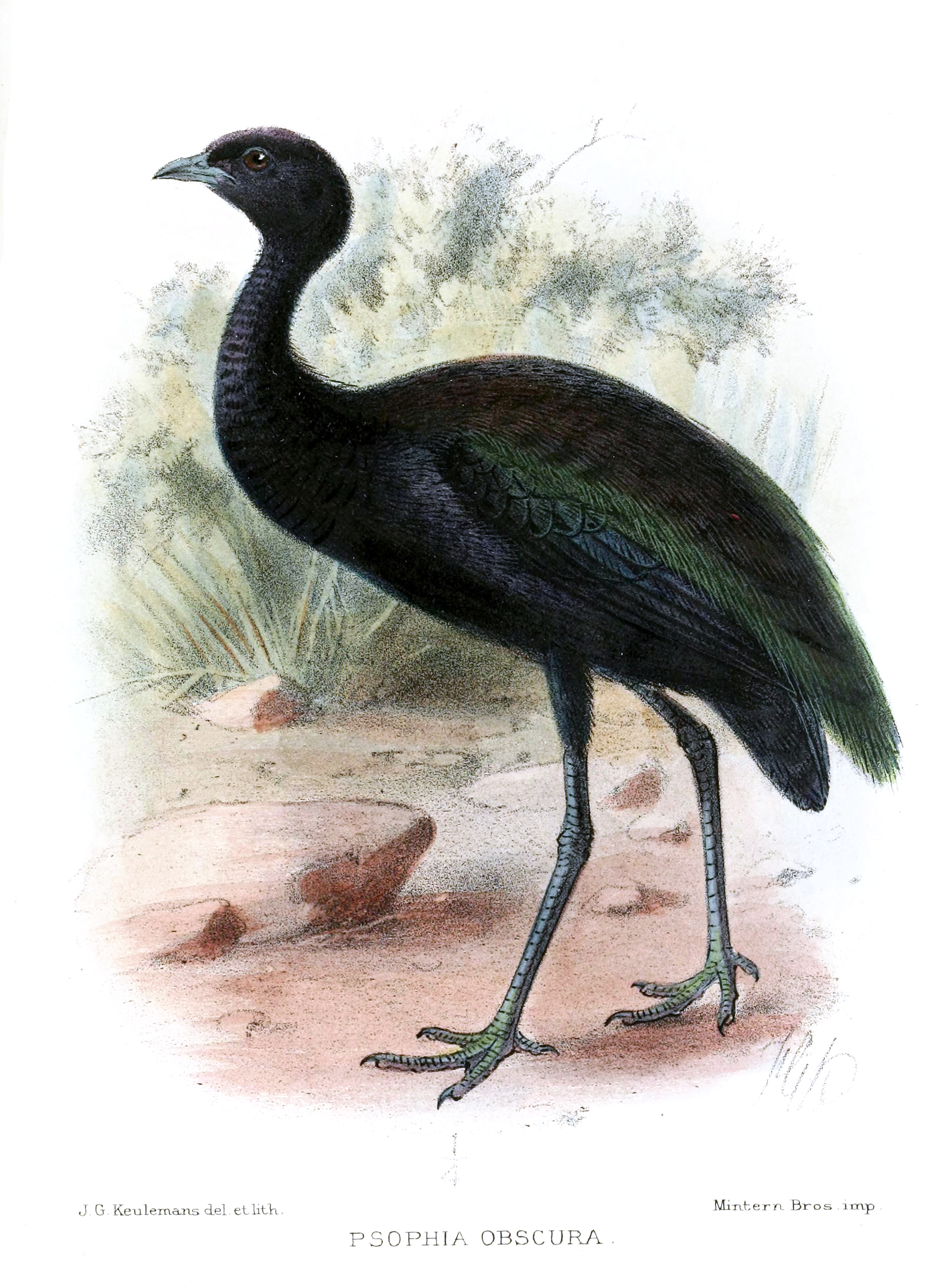

Conservation status
- Critically Endangered (IUCN 3.1)

Scientific classification
- Kingdom: Animalia
- Phylum: Chordata
- Class: Aves
- Order: Gruiformes
- Family: Psophiidae
- Genus: Psophia
- Species: P. obscura

Binomial name
- Psophia obscura Pelzeln, 1857

Synonyms
- Psophia viridis obscura

= Black-winged trumpeter =

Species of bird

The black-winged trumpeter (Psophia obscura), also called the dusky trumpeter, is a species of bird in the family Psophiidae. It was formerly listed as a subspecies of the dark-winged trumpeter but is now considered a separate species. It only has a population of about 50–400 individuals, with its small population continuing to decrease. This species is vulnerable to hunting and its population may be so low that it is likely split into two subpopulations.
