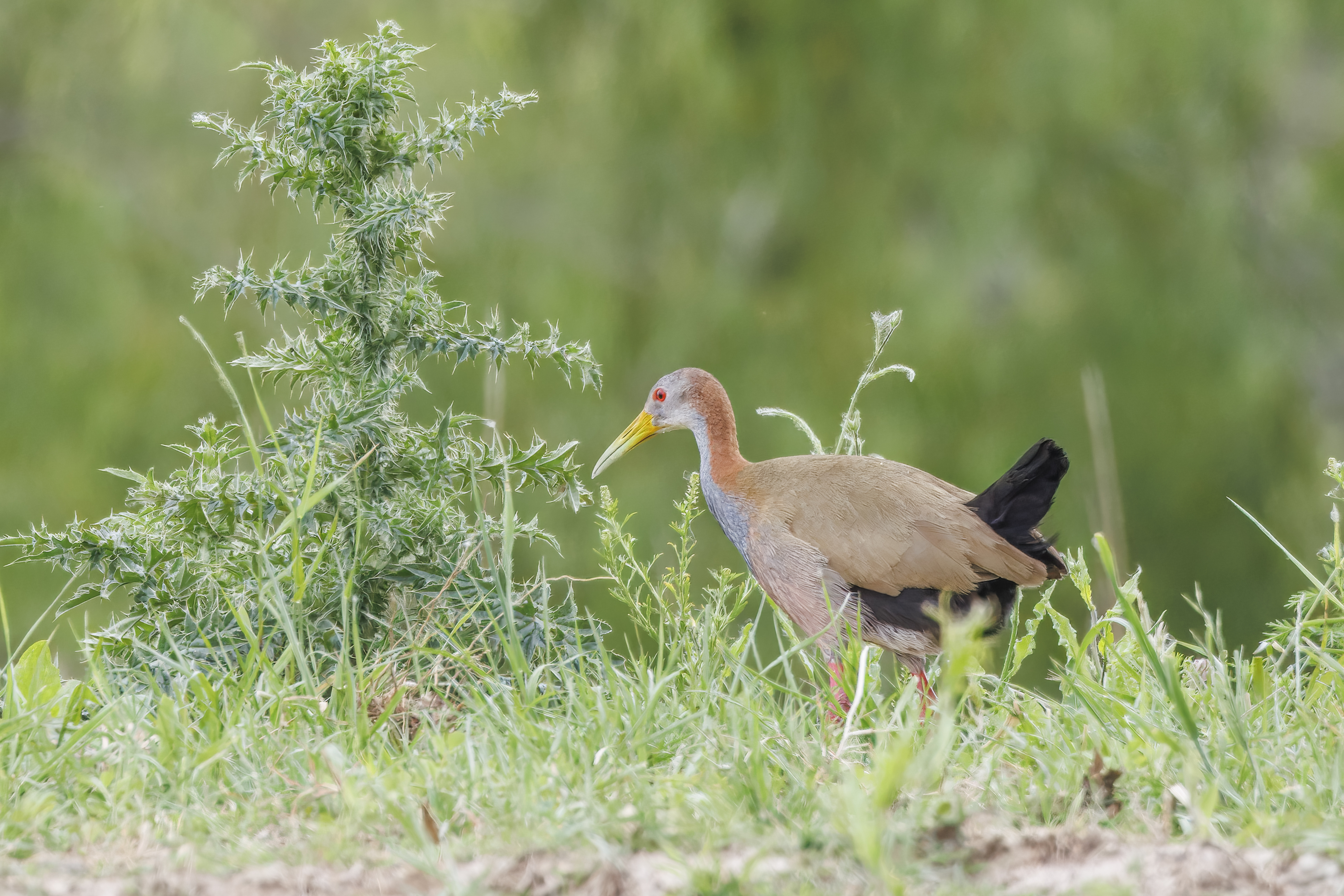

Conservation status
- Least Concern (IUCN 3.1)

Scientific classification
- Kingdom: Animalia
- Phylum: Chordata
- Class: Aves
- Order: Gruiformes
- Family: Rallidae
- Genus: Aramides
- Species: A. ypecaha

Binomial name
- Aramides ypecaha (Vieillot, 1819)

= Giant wood rail =

Species of bird

The giant wood rail (Aramides ypecaha) is a species of bird in the subfamily Rallinae of the rail, crake, and coot family Rallidae. It is found in Argentina, Bolivia, Brazil, Paraguay, and Uruguay.

== Taxonomy and systematics ==
The giant wood rail is monotypic.

== Description ==
The giant wood rail is 41 to 45 cm (16 to 18 in) long, and possibly as long as 53 cm (21 in). Two females weighed 640 and 765 g (23 and 27 oz), And three males weighed 655–860 g (23.1–30.3 oz). The sexes are alike. Adults have a large mustard yellow bill, a red eye, and red legs and feet. Their face to their upper chest is bluish gray with a white chin. The back of their neck is rust red, their back olive, and their uppertail coverts and tail are black. Their flanks, breast, and belly are brownish pink. Juvenile plumage has not been described.

== Distribution and habitat ==
The giant wood rail is found in eastern Bolivia, east-central and southeastern Brazil, Paraguay, Uruguay, and northeastern Argentina. It is a bird of the lowlands, where it inhabits wet landscapes such as marshes, lightly wooded swamps, gallery forest, and fields and pastures near water and cover.

== Behavior ==
=== Movement ===
The giant wood rail appears to be a year-round resident throughout its range.

=== Feeding ===
Little is known about the giant wood rail's foraging methods or diet. It has been recorded digging in soil and photographed carrying a snake. It forages in the open more than others of its genus.

=== Breeding ===
The giant wood rail's breeding season is not known. It makes a nest of grasses and weed stems in a shrub or matted vegetation a meter or more above water. The clutch size is four or five eggs. Captive individuals had an incubation period of 24 days. Chicks left the nest after about four days and were cared for by both parents for up to nine weeks.

=== Vocalization ===
The giant wood rail is highly vocal, calling during the day and evening. Several birds gather and "set up an astonishingly powerful, even deafening, chorus of screams, shrieks and wheezes".

== Status ==
The IUCN has assessed the giant wood rail as being of Least Concern. It has a large range, but its population size is not known and is believed to be decreasing. No immediate threats have been identified. It is often kept in captivity. In the wild, it "must have decreased in numbers as a result of extensive habitat destruction".
