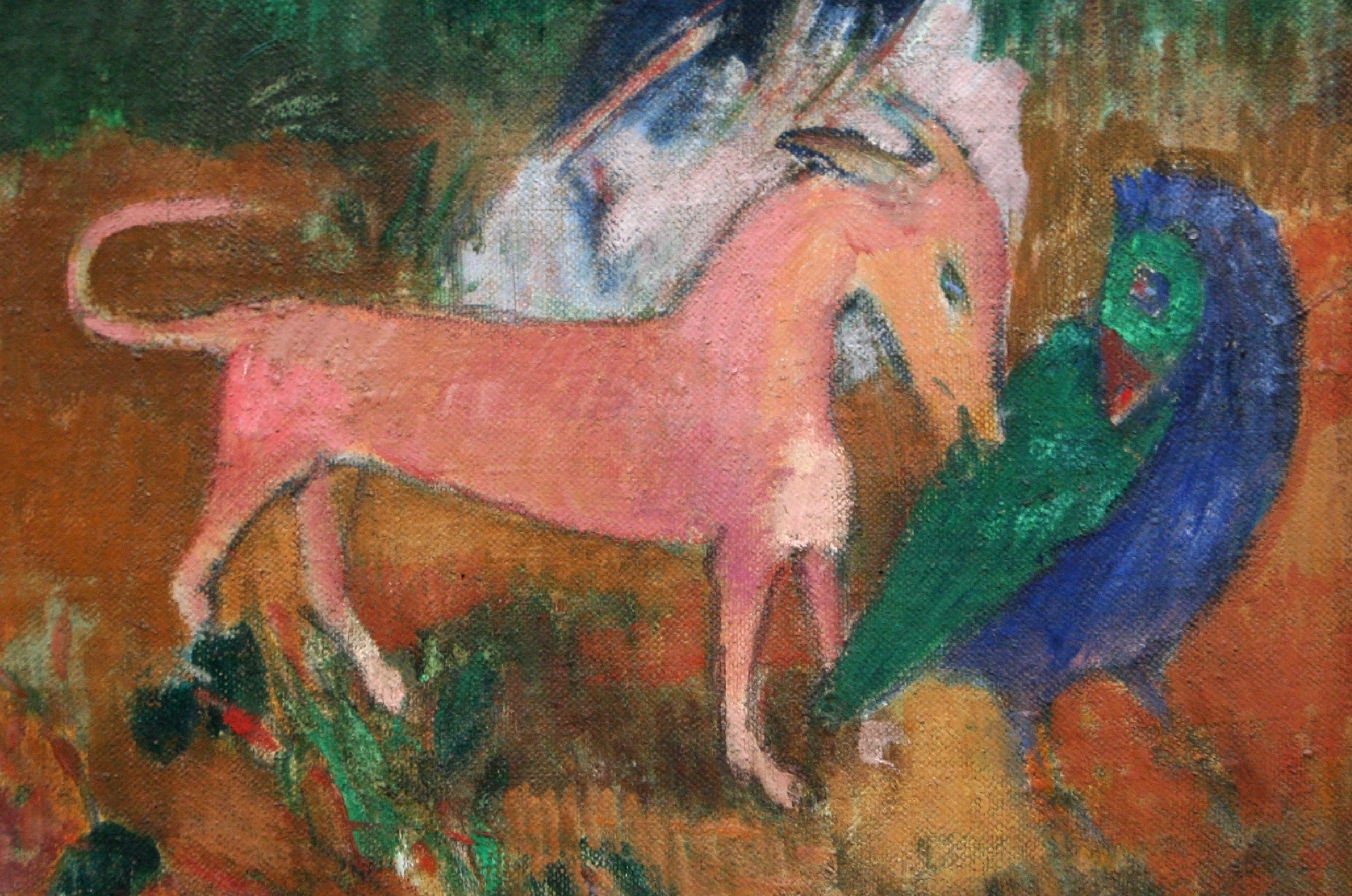
- Paul Gauguin's 1902 probable depiction of the Marquesan swamphen (Porphyrio paepae) being killed by a dog.

Conservation status
- Extinct (IUCN 3.1)

Scientific classification
- Kingdom: Animalia
- Phylum: Chordata
- Class: Aves
- Order: Gruiformes
- Family: Rallidae
- Genus: Porphyrio
- Species: †P. paepae

Binomial name
- †Porphyrio paepae Steadman, 1988

= Marquesas swamphen =

Extinct species of bird

The Marquesas swamphen (Porphyrio paepae) is an extinct species of swamphen from the Marquesas Islands Hiva Oa and Tahuata. It was originally described from 600-year-old subfossil remains from Tahuata and Hiva Oa. It may have survived to around 1900; in the lower right corner of Paul Gauguin's 1902 painting Le Sorcier d'Hiva Oa ou le Marquisien à la cape rouge there is a bird which resembles native descriptions of Porphyrio paepae. Thor Heyerdahl claimed to have seen a similar flightless bird on Hiva Oa in 1937.

== Sources ==
- Steadman, David W. (2006). Extinction and Biogeography of Tropical Pacific Birds. Chicago: University of Chicago Press. pp. 101, 105–6, 127, 243–4, 312–5, 523. ISBN 0-226-77142-3.
