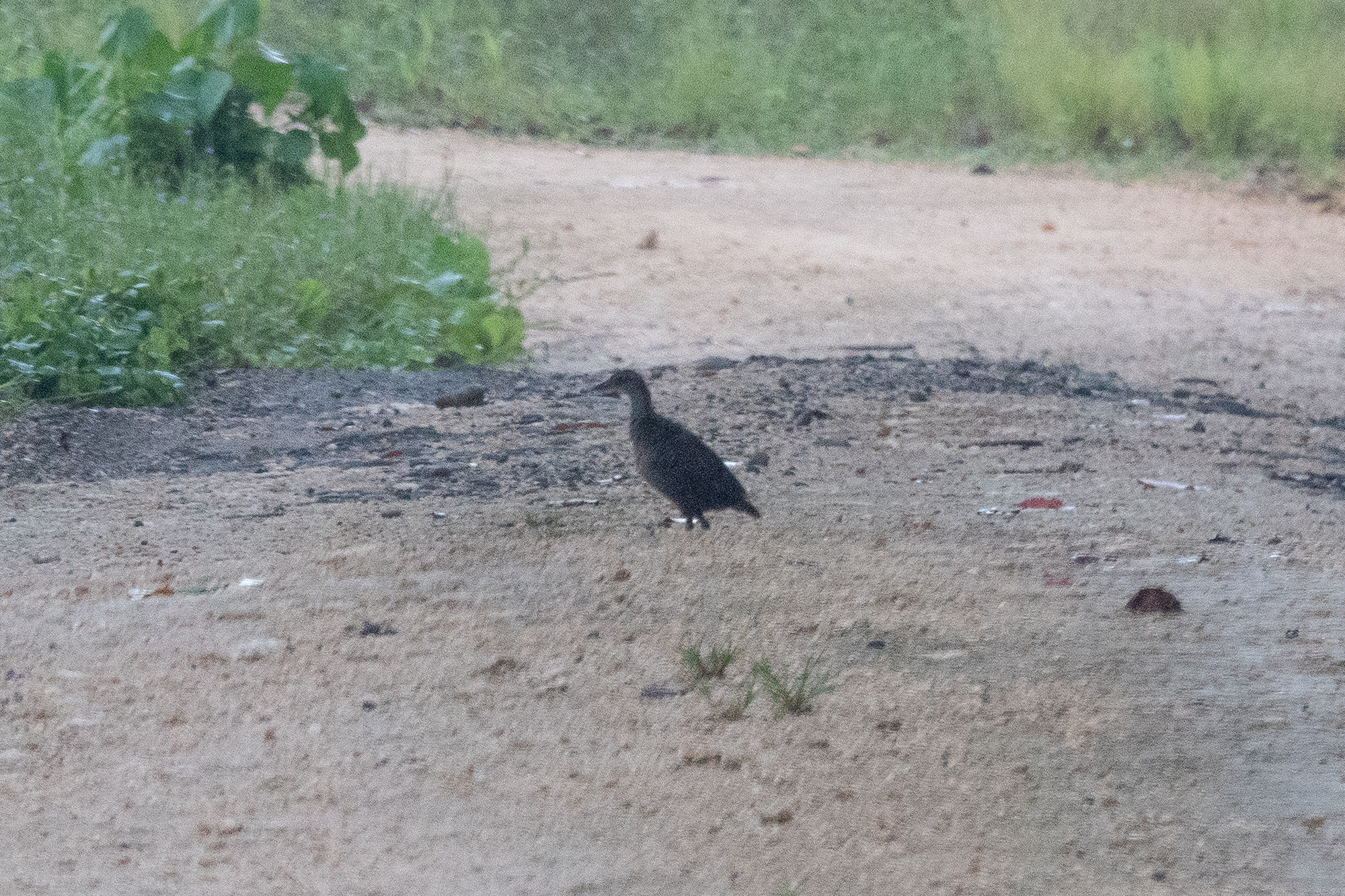

Conservation status
- Least Concern (IUCN 3.1)

Scientific classification
- Kingdom: Animalia
- Phylum: Chordata
- Class: Aves
- Order: Gruiformes
- Family: Rallidae
- Genus: Gallirallus
- Species: G. rovianae

Binomial name
- Gallirallus rovianae Diamond, 1991

Synonyms
- Hypotaenidia rovianae

= Roviana rail =

Species of bird

The Roviana rail (Gallirallus rovianae) is a species of bird in the family Rallidae. It is endemic to the Western Province (Solomon Islands). The species has sometimes been placed in the genus Hypotaenidia.

Its natural habitats are subtropical or tropical moist lowland forest, subtropical or tropical moist shrubland, and plantations.

This bird is a medium sized rail and flightless or near flightless. It is about 30 cm (12 in) in length. It breeds in June during the dry season, and lays two to three eggs.
