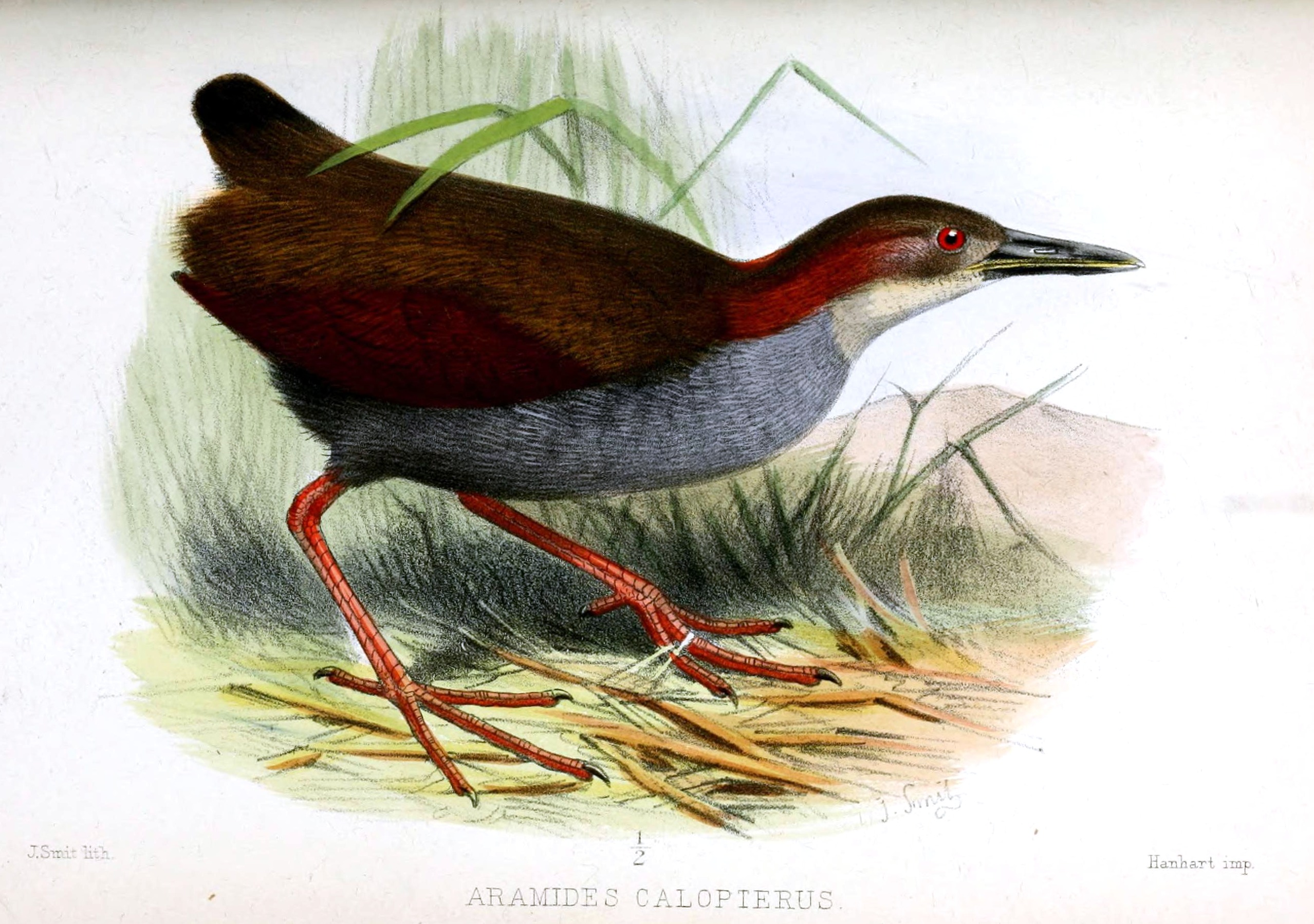

Conservation status
- Least Concern (IUCN 3.1)

Scientific classification
- Kingdom: Animalia
- Phylum: Chordata
- Class: Aves
- Order: Gruiformes
- Family: Rallidae
- Genus: Aramides
- Species: A. calopterus

Binomial name
- Aramides calopterus Sclater, PL & Salvin, 1878

= Red-winged wood rail =

Species of bird

The red-winged wood rail (Aramides calopterus) is a species of bird in the subfamily Rallinae of the rail, crake, and coot family Rallidae. It is found in Brazil, Ecuador and Peru.

== Taxonomy and systematics ==
The red-winged wood rail is monotypic.

== Description ==
The red-winged wood rail is 31 to 35 cm (12 to 14 in) long. The sexes are alike. Adults have a yellow-green bill, a red eye, and coral red legs and feet. The front of their face and their breast and belly are dark gray, with a white throat. The rest of their face, the sides of their neck, and the upperwing coverts are bright rufous. Their back is brownish olive and their rump, tail, and undertail coverts are black.

== Distribution and habitat ==
The red-winged wood rail is found in the western Amazon basin, in eastern Ecuador, north- and central eastern Peru, and the western part of the Brazilian state of Amazonas. It inhabits seasonally flooded igapó forest and other forest types along streams.

== Behavior ==
Nothing is known about the red-winged wood rail's movements, foraging methods and diet, and breeding biology. As of late 2022 xeno-canto had three recordings of its call and the Cornell Lab of Ornithology's Macaulay Library had only one.

== Status ==
The IUCN has assessed the red-winged wood rail as being of Least Concern, though it has a somewhat limited range and an unknown population size that is believed to be decreasing. No immediate threats are known. It is seldom seen and its status in most of its range is unknown. "In view of its scarcity in some areas, its restricted distribution in threatened habitats and the lack of knowledge of its natural history, [the] species should be classified as a Data Deficient species."
