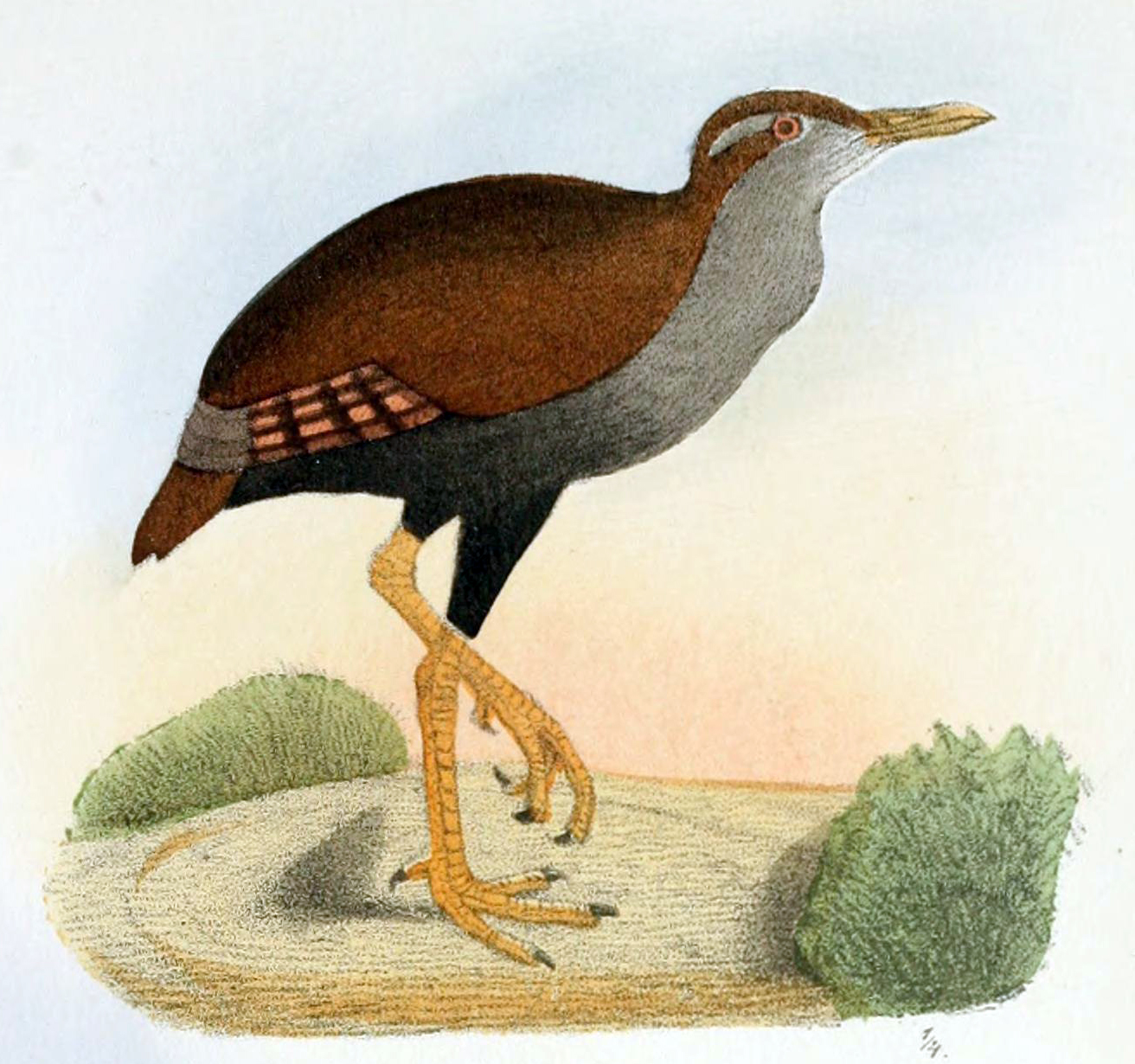
- Drawing from 1867

Conservation status
- Extinct (IUCN 3.1)

Scientific classification
- Kingdom: Animalia
- Phylum: Chordata
- Class: Aves
- Order: Gruiformes
- Family: Rallidae
- Genus: Gallirallus
- Species: †G. poecilopterus

Binomial name
- †Gallirallus poecilopterus (Hartlaub, 1866)

Synonyms
- Hypotaenidia poeciloptera; Gallirallus poecilopterus

= Bar-winged rail =

Bar-winged rail Temporal range: Late Pleistocene–Late Holocene

Extinct species of bird

The bar-winged rail (Gallirallus poecilopterus) is an extinct species of bird in the family Rallidae.

== Taxonomy ==
Specimen in Naturalis

It was endemic to Fiji and was last collected ca 1890 in Viti Levu. The species was identified from twelve 19th century specimens, some of which are known to be in Boston, London and New York. The last unconfirmed sighting of this bird was in 1973. The bar winged rail was declared extinct by the IUCN in 1994.

Fossil remains dating back to the late Pleistocene or early Holocene are known from some caves in Fiji. The species was formerly placed in the genus Hypotaenidia.

== Description and status ==
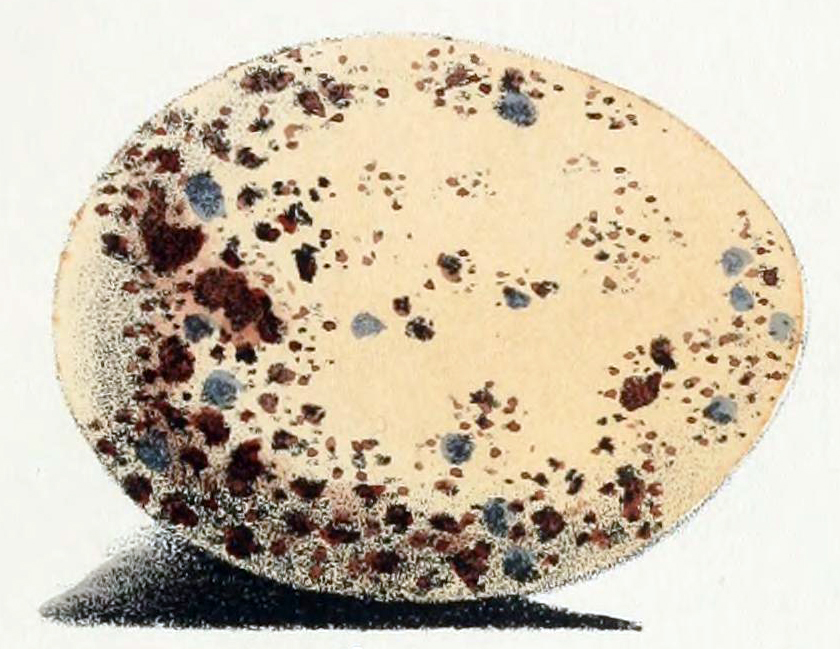
Egg

The bar-winged was likely flightless. It is about 33 cm (13 in) in length, and the females may have been slightly larger.

Twelve specimens are known from the 19th century. There was one unconfirmed record in 1973, the first since 1890. Its former abundance hasn't been estimated, as it was always shy and rarely seen.
