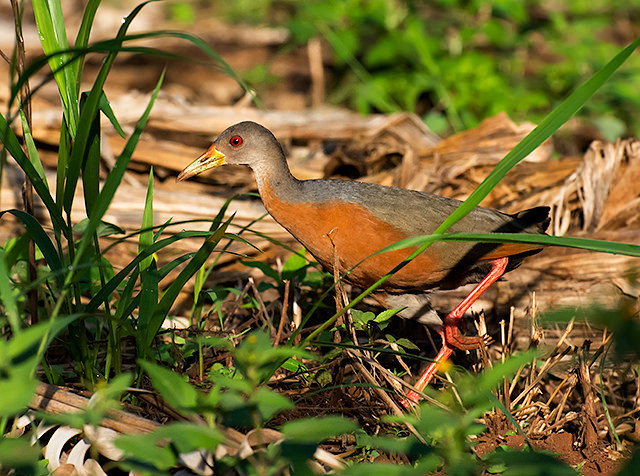

Conservation status
- Least Concern (IUCN 3.1)

Scientific classification
- Kingdom: Animalia
- Phylum: Chordata
- Class: Aves
- Order: Gruiformes
- Family: Rallidae
- Genus: Aramides
- Species: A. mangle

Binomial name
- Aramides mangle (Spix, 1825)

= Little wood rail =

Species of bird in Brazil

The little wood rail (Aramides mangle) is a species of bird in the subfamily Rallinae of the rail, crake, and coot family Rallidae. It is endemic to Brazil.

== Taxonomy and systematics ==
The little wood rail is monotypic.

== Description ==
The little wood rail is 27 to 29 cm (11 to 11 in) long; two females weighed 164–202 g (5.8–7.1 oz). It is the smallest member of genus Aramides. The sexes are alike. They have a stout greenish bill with red at the base of the maxilla and red legs and feet. Adults have a gray head, neck, and upper back, and the rest of the back and their wings are olive brown to greenish olive. Their rump, tail, and undertail coverts are black. Their throat is white and their breast and belly rufous.

== Distribution and habitat ==
The little wood rail is found in Brazil from northeastern Pará south along the coast to São Paulo state and somewhat inland in the northeast. It has also been documented as a vagrant in French Guiana. The species mostly inhabits coastal swamps and lagoons including mangrove forest. Inland it is found in caatinga, a rather dry biome.

== Behavior ==
=== Movement ===
The little wood rail is resident along the coast. It occurs irregularly in the inland caatinga, movements which appear to be range extensions and contractions rather than true migration.

=== Feeding ===
Almost nothing is known about the little wood rail's foraging behavior or diet. It has been observed probing mud and holding a crab.

=== Breeding ===
The little wood rail has been recorded breeding between May and July in the caatinga and between October and November in the coastal southern part of its range. The few known nests were cups of sticks, grass, and dead leaves with clutches of five or six eggs. Nothing else is known about the species' breeding biology.

=== Vocalization ===
The little wood rail's apparent song is a "[p]enetrating, loud 'pik-pik-pik' or 'pyok-pyok-pyok...'". Members of a pair often reply to each other at slightly different pitches.

== Status ==
The IUCN has assessed the little wood rail as being of Least Concern, though its population size and trend are unknown. No immediate threats have been identified. However, "In view of its potentially restricted distribution, the almost total lack of knowledge about its natural history, and the possibility of threats to its wetland habitats [the] species should at least be considered Data Deficient and worthy of urgent investigation."
