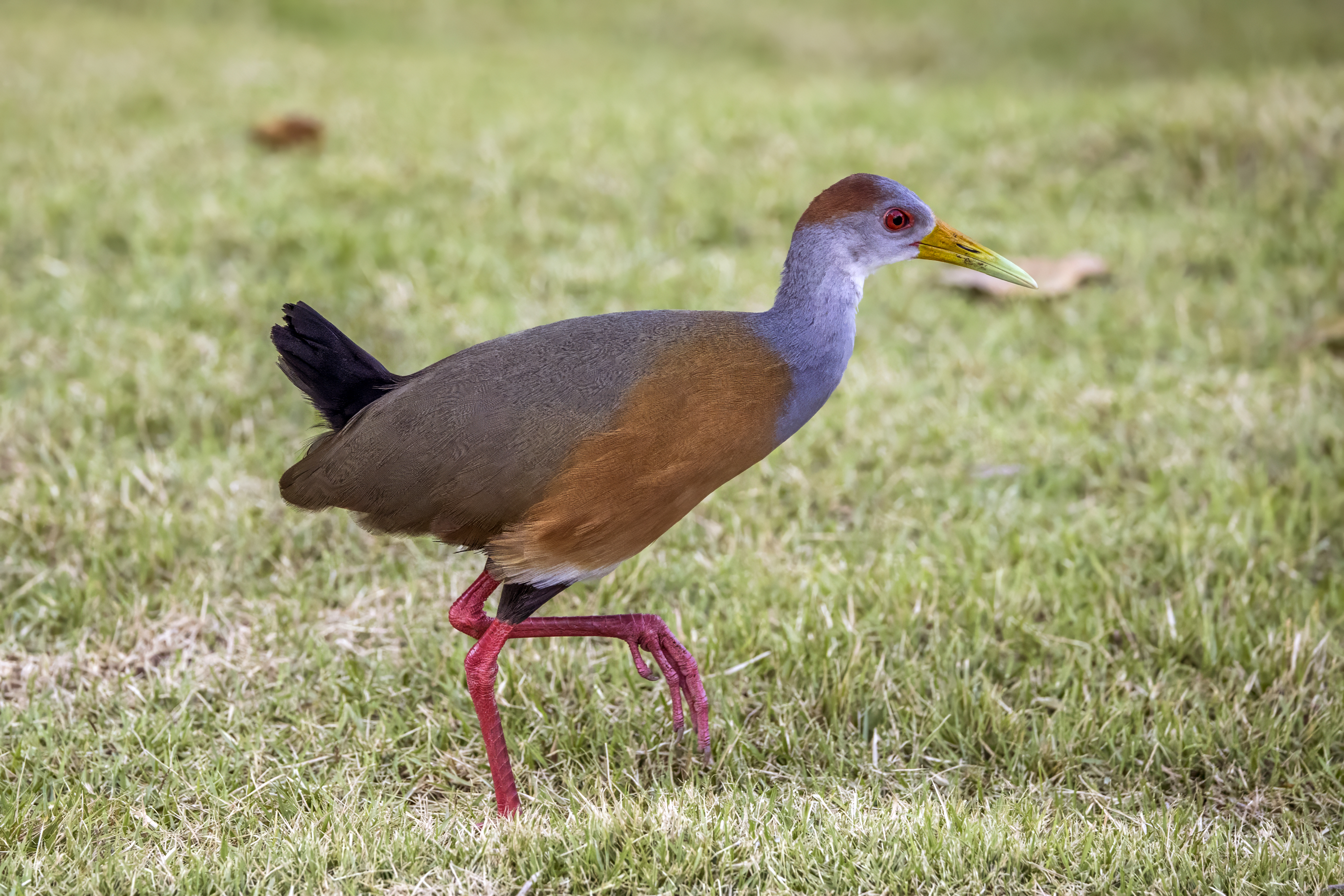

Conservation status
- Least Concern (IUCN 3.1)

Scientific classification
- Kingdom: Animalia
- Phylum: Chordata
- Class: Aves
- Order: Gruiformes
- Family: Rallidae
- Genus: Aramides
- Species: A. albiventris

Binomial name
- Aramides albiventris Lawrence, 1868

Subspecies
- See text

Synonyms
- Aramides cajaneus albiventris

= Russet-naped wood rail =

Species of bird

The russet-naped wood rail or rufous-naped wood rail (Aramides albiventris) is a species of bird in the subfamily Rallinae of the rail, crake, and coot family Rallidae. It is found from Mexico to Costa Rica.

== Taxonomy and systematics ==
The russet-naped wood rail was originally described as a species but in the early 20th century was reclassified as a subspecies of what was then called the gray-necked wood rail (Aramides cajanea). A 2015 paper by Marcondes and Silveira proposed reconsidering its position and in 2016 taxonomic systems restored it to species status and renamed the now-reduced A. cajanea the grey-cowled wood rail.

The Clements taxonomy and BirdLife International's Handbook of the Birds of the World follow Marcondes and Silveira in treating the russet-naped wood rail as monotypic. However, the International Ornithological Committee (IOC) assigns it these five subspecies:

- A. a. mexicanus Bangs, 1907
- A. a. vanrossemi Dickey, 1929
- A. a. albiventris Lawrence, 1867
- A. a. pacificus A. H. Miller & Griscom, 1921
- A. a. plumbeicollis Zeledon, 1888

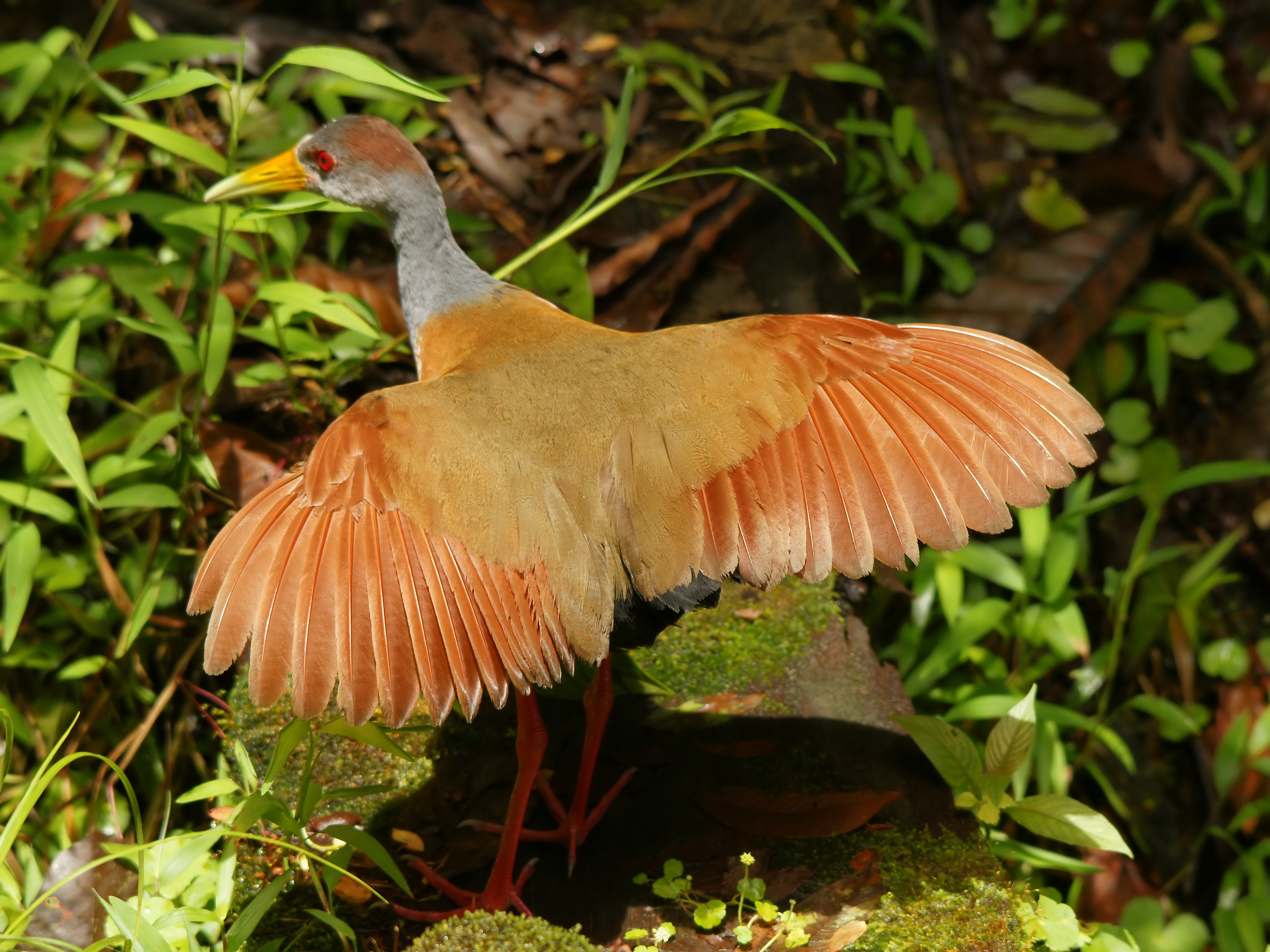
A. a. plumbeicollis displaying wing and head coloration

== Description ==
The russet-naped wood rail is 33 to 40 cm (13 to 16 in) long and weighs about 450 to 600 g (16 to 21 oz). The sexes are alike and the subspecies are practically indistinguishable from each other. Adults have a thick dark yellow bill with a light green tip, a deep red eye, and red to pink legs and feet. Their forehead, crown, and hindneck are slate gray, and the back of the head has a chestnut patch. Their back is grayish olive and the tail black. Their chin and upper throat are white and the sides of the neck, lower throat, and upper breast are gray. The rest of their breast, the upper belly, and flanks are pale tawny cinnamon blending to a pale band separating them from the black lower belly, vent, and underatail coverts. Juveniles have no white on their belly and instead of the adult's black underparts theirs are dark gray with tawny flecks.

== Distribution and habitat ==
According to the IOC, the subspecies of russet-naped wood rail are found thus:

- A. a. mexicanus, eastern Mexico from southern Tamaulipas south onto the Yucatán Peninsula
- A. a. vanrossemi, the Pacific slope from Oaxaca in southern Mexico to southern Guatemala and El Salvador
- A. a. albiventris, from the Yucatán Peninsula through Belize into northern Guatemala
- A. a. pacificus, the Caribbean slope of Honduras and Nicaragua
- A. a. plumbeicollis, northeastern Costa Rica

The russet-naped wood rail inhabits a wide variety of landscapes, both wet and dry. Marshes both fresh and salt, swamp forest, river and stream corridors, thorn forest, semi-evergreen forest, and mangrove forest are all represented as long as they provide dense cover.

== Behavior ==
=== Movement ===
The russet-naped wood rail is a year-round resident throughout its range.

=== Feeding ===
The russet-naped wood rail is usually secretive and mostly forages in dense vegetation. It does feed in the open at times, especially along stream banks, and has also been observed feeding in grassy areas near the forest. Its diet is not known in detail but it has been documented feeding on vegetable matter, snails, crabs, and a snake.

=== Breeding ===
The russet-naped wood rail's nesting season is not well known, but adults in breeding condition have been noted in January, April through June, and August. Its nest is a shallow bowl loosely constructed of sticks and plant fibers placed a few meters up in a bush, vines, or a tree. Often the nest is above water. The clutch size is three to seven eggs. The average dimensions of eight eggs was found to be 47.5–51.8 mm (1.87–2.04 in) in length 34.5–38.6 mm (1.36–1.52 in). The egg mass was calculated to be 35.6 g (1.26 oz). The incubation period and time to independence are not known.

=== Vocalization ===
The russet-naped wood rail's song has been described as "a varied, rapid, crazed-sounding, rollicking, popping, and clucking series". Three transcriptions are "coo-coocoo-coo' ki-ki-kik' cococo", "pop-tiyi pop-tiyi co-co-co-co-co", and "kook-kook-kook-kway!-kway!-kway!-kway!". The species also makes "a sharp shriek, harsh cackle, or growl when disturbed" and "low grunting clucks, puk, whut, kuk etc.". It is most vocal at twilight and at night.

== Status ==
The IUCN has assessed the russet-naped wood rail as being of Least Concern. It has a very large range and an estimated population of at least 50,000 mature individuals, though the latter is believed to be decreasing. No immediate threats have been identified. "The mangrove and marsh habitats preferred by this species are undoubtedly some of the world's most fragile and threatened habitat types".
