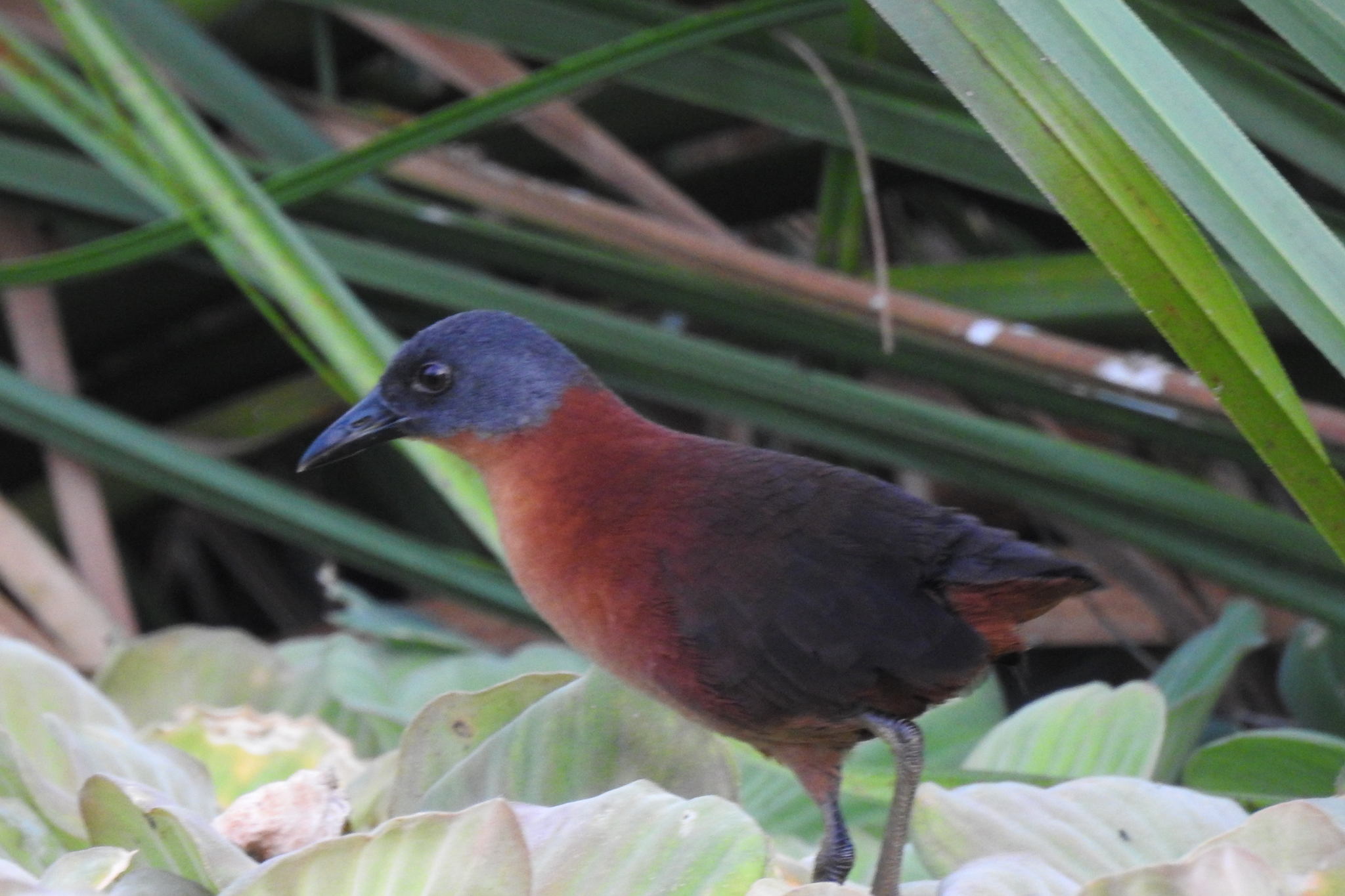

Conservation status
- Least Concern (IUCN 3.1)

Scientific classification
- Kingdom: Animalia
- Phylum: Chordata
- Class: Aves
- Order: Gruiformes
- Family: Rallidae
- Genus: Laterallus
- Species: L. ruber

Binomial name
- Laterallus ruber (Sclater, PL & Salvin, 1860)

= Ruddy crake =

Species of bird

The ruddy crake (Laterallus ruber) is a bird in the rail family, Rallidae. Other names the ruddy crake is known by are "red rail", "ruddy rail" and "red crake".

== Description ==
The ruddy crake can be identified by its ruddy plumage that can vary in shade and gray head with dark brown wings and tail. It is mostly bright chestnut in colour with a paler chin and belly, blackish crown and dark grey ear-coverts. Ruddy crakes are about the size of a sparrow. It is a small crake, 14–16.5 cm in length. Immature ruddy crakes tend to show discoloration on their midline or nape, such as a pale midline or chestnut colored nape. The bill is black, the iris is red and the legs and feet are olive-green. This distinct characteristic of yellow green legs, differentiating it from other small birds. The ruddy crake has a short black conical bill, and it has wide spread feet specifically adapted for wet habitats. Female ruddy crakes are more drab than males, and the males have rusty red plumage on the breast.

== Habitat and distribution ==
The ruddy crake, similar to others in the Rallidae family, prefers wet pastures and marshes, especially the tall grasses. The ruddy crake populates the lowlands of the Caribbean, including areas of the Veracruz east, Yucatan Peninsula, and Honduras. The bird occurs from Mexico south to north-west Costa Rica. It is found in freshwater habitats such as marshes, reedbeds, damp fields and ditches.

In the 1960s and 1970s, the ruddy crake was regarded as the most abundant crake in its range in Mexico, while it is considered rare in Costa Rica. Based on range maps, the breeding distribution is 655,600 kilometers squared. The ruddy crake was listed as possibly extinct by the Asociación Ornitológica de Costa Rica because there were no sightings for two decades. However, in May 2007 a ruddy crake was viewed near the trail by the La Selva Biological Research Station, indicating a widespread range.

== Behavior ==
=== Diet ===
The ruddy crake eats invertebrates and plants near the surface of water, including decaying plants, water snails, water beetles, mosquito larvae, and mayflies in the wetland habitat.

=== Reproduction ===
In crake reproduction, they lay 6–12 eggs in a nest near the water made from plants. The male and female take turns sitting on the eggs for three weeks, and the eggs will hatch over a week-long period. The male will care for the chicks while the female sits on the younger eggs. Once all eggs hatch, both parents feed and guard the chicks. Often, the chicks will be split up between the two parents.

== Conservation ==
=== Population ===
Deforestation and habitat degradation has caused decreases in the population of ruddy crakes, but land preservation by governments and other conservation groups have benefited the species. The Partners in Flight organization estimated the population of the ruddy crakes to be made up of less than 50,000 individuals. The overall population trend, however, is unable to be determined, as the volume of threats and level of threats that the species faces is uncertain.

=== Conservation status ===
The conservation status of the ruddy crake is currently at the level of "Least Concern".

== Taxonomy ==
The old Latin name for the ruddy crake was "Corethrura rubra".
