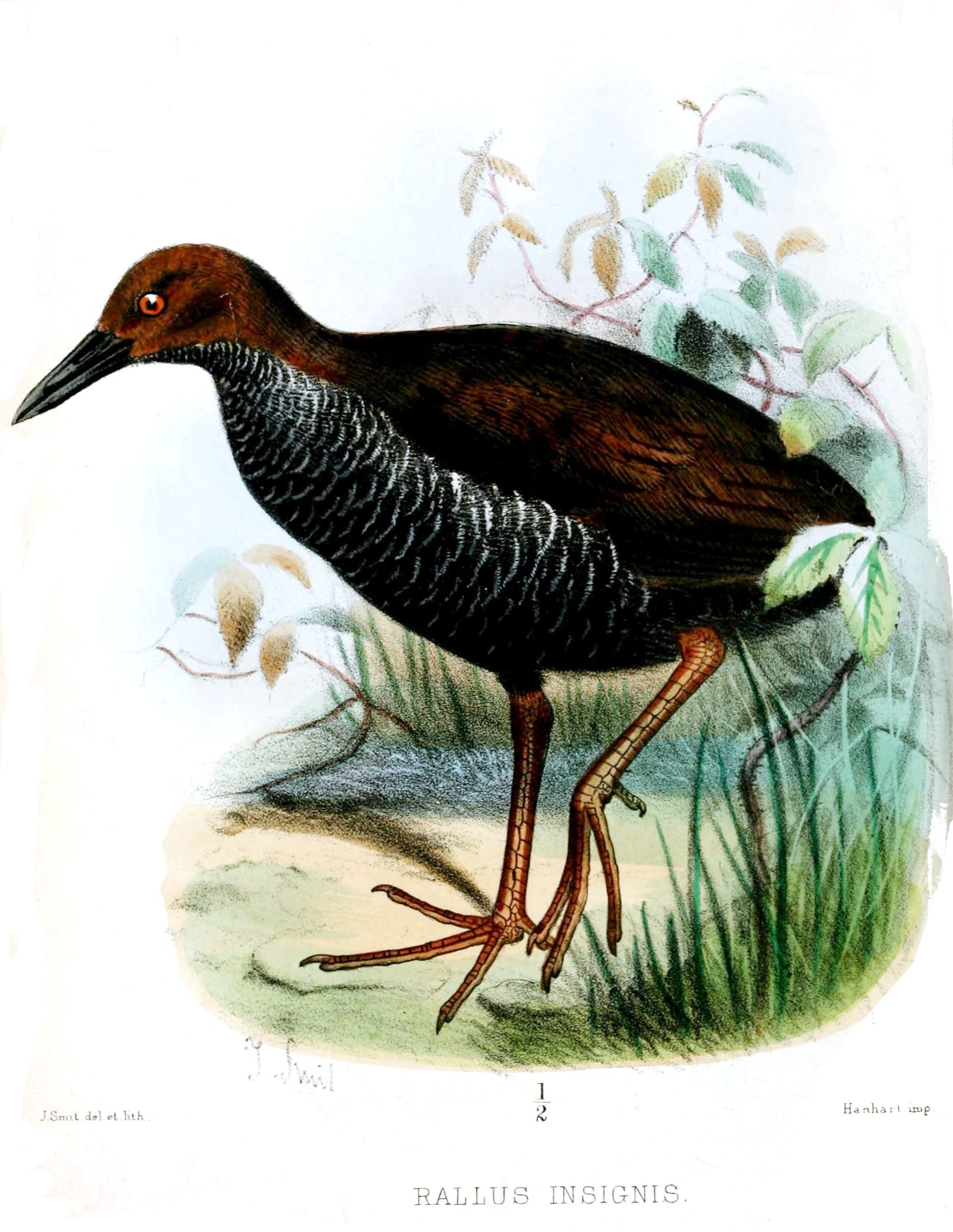

- Adult and a juvenile in West New Britain, Papua New Guinea

Conservation status
- Near Threatened (IUCN 3.1)

Scientific classification
- Kingdom: Animalia
- Phylum: Chordata
- Class: Aves
- Order: Gruiformes
- Family: Rallidae
- Genus: Gallirallus
- Species: G. insignis

Binomial name
- Gallirallus insignis (P.L. Sclater, 1880)

Synonyms
- Hypotaenidia insignis

= Pink-legged rail =

Species of bird

The pink-legged rail (Gallirallus insignis), also known as the New Britain rail, is a species of bird in the family Rallidae.

== Taxonomy ==
The species was formerly placed in the genus Hypotaenidia.

It is sometime placed in the genus Rallus. It is monotypic.

== Description ==
The pink-legged rail is 33 cm (13 in) in length. It has a very short tail and is probably nearly flightless, but there are some reports it can fly well.

== Distribution and habitat ==
It is endemic to the island of New Britain. Its natural habitats are subtropical or tropical moist lowland forest and subtropical or tropical moist montane forest. It is threatened by habitat loss.
