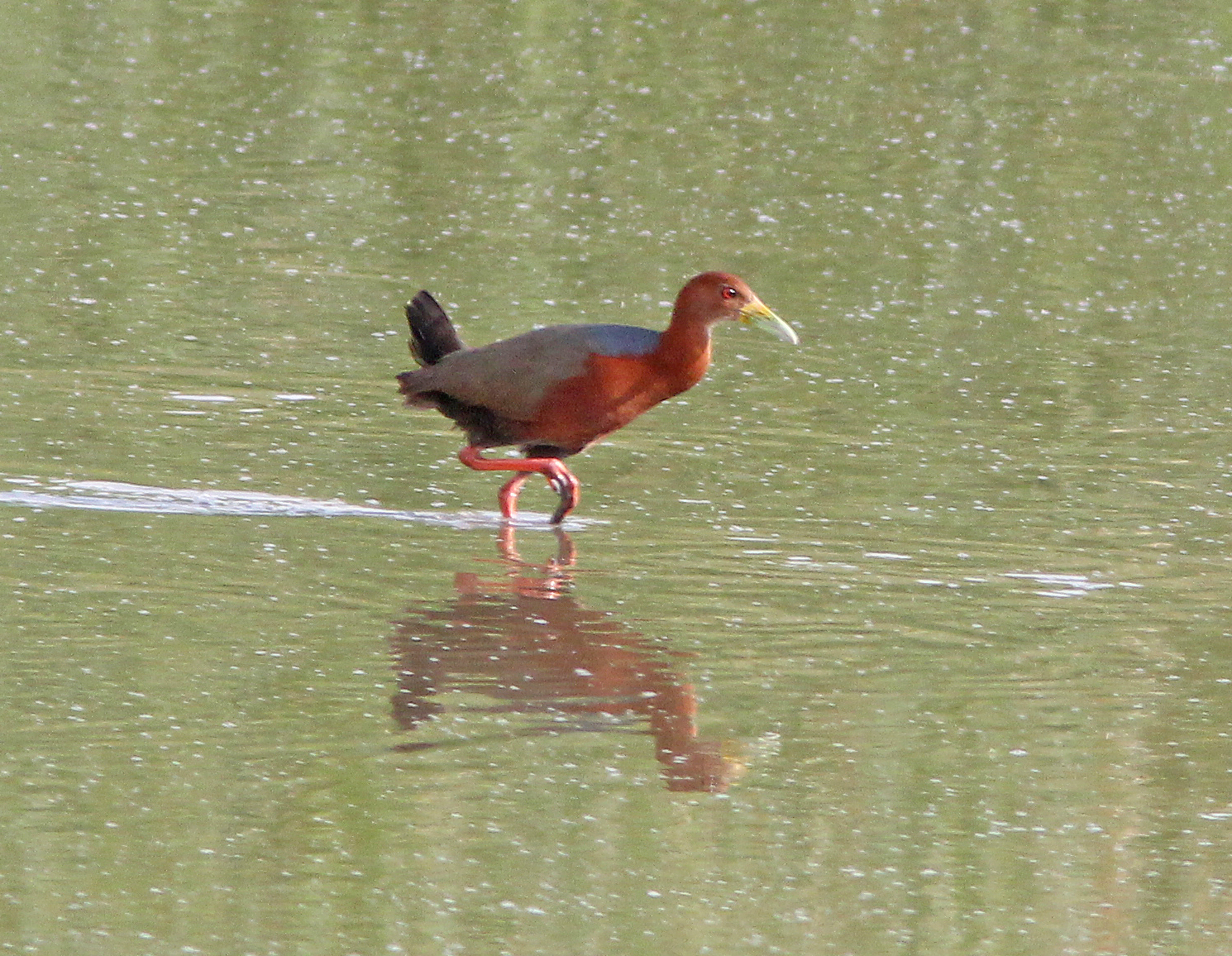

Conservation status
- Least Concern (IUCN 3.1)

Scientific classification
- Kingdom: Animalia
- Phylum: Chordata
- Class: Aves
- Order: Gruiformes
- Family: Rallidae
- Genus: Aramides
- Species: A. axillaris

Binomial name
- Aramides axillaris Lawrence, 1863

Audio

= Rufous-necked wood rail =

Species of bird

The rufous-necked wood rail (Aramides axillaris) is a species of bird in the subfamily Rallinae of the rail, crake, and coot family Rallidae. It is found in Mexico, Central America, seven mainland South American countries, and Trinidad.

== Taxonomy and systematics ==
The rufous-necked wood rail is monotypic.

== Description ==
The rufous-necked wood rail is 29 to 33 cm (11 to 13 in) long and males weigh on average 292 g (0.644 lb). The sexes are alike. They have long, stout, yellow-green bills and red legs and feet. Adults' head, neck, and breast are rufous brown. Their nape and upper back are gray and the rest of the back olive brown to greenish olive. Their wings are greenish olive and chestnut. Their rump, tail, flanks, and undertail coverts are black. Their throat is white and their belly grayish brown. Juveniles are much duller overall. Their upperparts are like the adults' but duller. Their face, chin, and upper neck are buffy brown to dirty white with a cinnamon wash. Their lower flanks and undertail coverts are deep brownish olive and the rest of their underparts buffy brown with an ochre cinnamon wash.

Standard Measurements
	Male	Female
Wing length	16.3–17.4 cm (6.4–6.9 in)	14.55–17 cm (5.73–6.69 in)
tail length	5.3–6.3 cm (2.1–2.5 in)	4.7–6.25 cm (1.85–2.46 in)
exposed culmen	3.95–4.6 cm (1.56–1.81 in)	3.75–4.6 cm (1.48–1.81 in)
tarsus length	5.25–6.3 cm (2.07–2.48 in)	5.0–6.05 cm (1.97–2.38 in)
mass	262–327 g (9.2–11.5 oz)	–

== Distribution and habitat ==
The rufous-necked wood rail is found in Mexico on the Pacific coast and the coast of the Yucatán Peninsula and generally (though discontinuously) along both the Pacific and Caribbean coasts of Central America. In South America it is found along the Pacific coast discontinuously from Colombia through Ecuador to northern Peru, along the Caribbean coast from Colombia through Venezuela and the Guianas, and on Trinidad. In addition, a vagrant spent much of July 2013 at Bosque del Apache National Wildlife Refuge in New Mexico. Many bird enthusiasts and watchers traveled to the state to view it.

The rufous-necked wood rail was long thought to be primarily a coastal species, and in parts of its range is known only from mangrove forest. However, a growing number of inland sightings in deciduous, humid, and montane forest as high as 1,400 m (4,600 ft) are suggestive of elevational migration, with mangroves being only winter habitat.

== Behavior ==
=== Movement ===
The rufous-necked wood rail has generally been considered a year-round resident throughout its range. However, there is strong evidence of seasonal elevational movements at least in Central America and perhaps western South America.

=== Feeding ===
The rufous-necked wood rail generally forages at morning and evening twilight. Though it is generally a secretive bird, when foraging it will often move several meters from cover onto open mudflats and stream banks. Its primary prey is crabs and it also takes other aquatic invertebrates.

=== Breeding ===
The rufous-necked wood rail's breeding biology is not well known. Its breeding season appears to vary geographically. Breeding records are few, and some of them are from inland forests. Two nests were described by one author as an open bowl made of twigs and lined with weed stems and both dead and green leaves. They were placed in a small tree and on a stump and both contained five eggs. The mean egg dimensions from one clutch is known, being 47 mm × 33 mm (1.9 in × 1.3 in).

=== Vocalization ===
The rufous-necked wood rail's song has been described as "loud, irregularly paced kip and kow notes, e.g., kip-kow-kip, kow-kip-kow, kip-kowkip-kow, kow, kow, kow-kip". Pairs sing in duet "a strident series of musical notes...CHI burr... CHI burr... CHI burr....". They mostly sing at dusk and dawn but also at night. The species also makes "a cluck and kik in alarm".

== Status ==
The IUCN has assessed the rufous-necked wood rail as being of Least Concern. It has a very large range and an estimated population of at least 50,000 mature individuals, though the latter is believed to be decreasing. No immediate threats have been identified. Mexico and Costa Rica consider it to be endangered in those countries. "Mangroves are imperiled by development, pollution, mariculture, and changes in sea level and salinity, all of which are anthropogenically driven."
