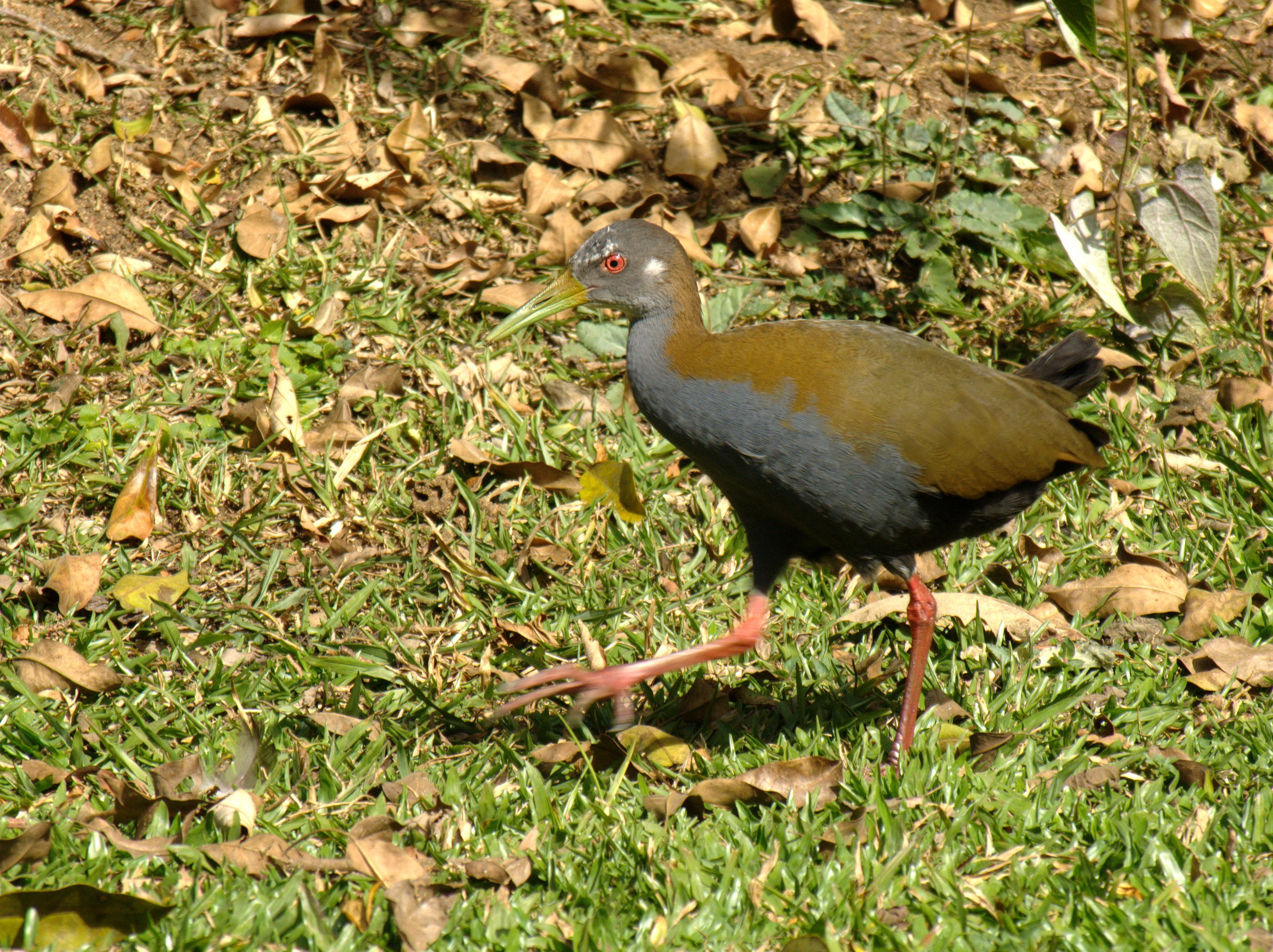

Conservation status
- Least Concern (IUCN 3.1)

Scientific classification
- Kingdom: Animalia
- Phylum: Chordata
- Class: Aves
- Order: Gruiformes
- Family: Rallidae
- Genus: Aramides
- Species: A. saracura

Binomial name
- Aramides saracura (Spix, 1825)

= Slaty-breasted wood rail =

Species of bird

The slaty-breasted wood rail (Aramides saracura) is a species of bird in the subfamily Rallinae of the rail, crake, and coot family Rallidae. It is found in Argentina, Brazil, and Paraguay.

== Taxonomy and systematics ==
The slaty-breasted wood rail is monotypic.

== Description ==
The slaty-breasted wood rail is 34 to 37 cm (13 to 15 in) long; one male weighed 540 g (19 oz). The sexes are alike. Adults have a green bill with a bluish base, a red eye, and reddish- to yellowish brown legs and feet. Most of their head and their throat, breast, and belly are slate gray. Their nape and shoulders are chestnut, their back olive, and their tail black. Immatures and juveniles have not been described.

== Distribution and habitat ==
The slaty-breasted wood rail is found in southeastern Brazil from southern Minas Gerais and Espírito Santo south and west into eastern Paraguay and northeastern Argentina. It generally inhabits somewhat wet forest and woodland, often in swampy areas or along streams, but usually avoids open marshes.

== Behavior ==
=== Movement ===
The slaty-breasted wood rail appears to be a year-round resident throughout its range.

=== Feeding ===
Usually feeds earthworms, beetle larvae and other small insects.

=== Breeding ===
The slaty-breasted wood rail's breeding season has not been fully defined but appears to include at least November to February. One nest is known; it was in a thick bush and held four or five eggs. Nothing else is known about the species' breeding biology.

=== Vocalization ===
The slaty-breasted rail mostly calls during the day. It makes a "[v]ariety of loud, resounding, noisy cries, including 'po-quit kwaa kwaa kwaa', 'po-peek' and 'po-pereek'", often for many minutes and usually in a duet. Another vocalization is "an irritated, rapidly repeated series of 'quir' notes".

== Status ==
The IUCN has assessed the slaty-breasted wood rail as being of Least Concern. It has a large range, but its population size is not known and is believed to be decreasing. No immediate threats have been identified. Its status in most of its range is uncertain. "Because of this, and because nothing is known of its natural history, [the] species should probably be classified as a Data Deficient species."
