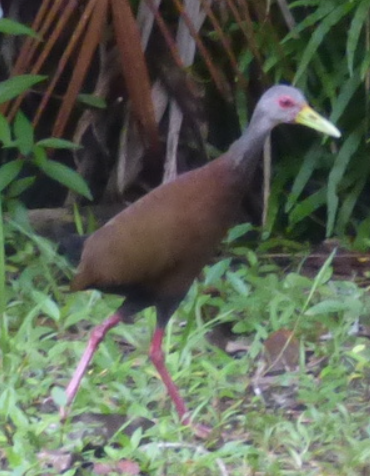

Conservation status
- Least Concern (IUCN 3.1)

Scientific classification
- Kingdom: Animalia
- Phylum: Chordata
- Class: Aves
- Order: Gruiformes
- Family: Rallidae
- Genus: Aramides
- Species: A. wolfi

Binomial name
- Aramides wolfi Berlepsch & Taczanowski, 1884

= Brown wood rail =

Species of bird

The brown wood rail (Aramides wolfi) is a species of bird in the subfamily Rallinae of the rail, crake, and coot family Rallidae. It is found in Colombia and Ecuador.

== Taxonomy and systematics ==
The brown wood rail is monotypic.

== Description ==
The brown wood rail is 33 to 36 cm (13 to 14 in) long, one male was found to weigh 454 g (16.0 oz). The sexes are alike. Adults have a yellow-green bill, a red eye, and pink legs and feet. Their head is ashy gray with a yellow spot on the forehead and a pale throat. Their tail, flanks, and belly are black and the rest of their body is chestnut to warm brown. Immatures and juveniles have not been described.

The brown wood rail's specific epithet commemorates the German naturalist Theodor Wolf.

== Distribution and habitat ==
The brown wood rail is patchily distributed in western Colombia and western Ecuador. A single 1977 report from Peru was retracted in 2011 and the South American Classification Committee of the American Ornithological Society does not recognize it. It inhabits a variety of wet and dry landscapes including mangroves, freshwater marsh, swampy woodland, river bottoms, and mature and secondary forest. In elevation it ranges from sea level to 900 m (3,000 ft).

== Behavior ==
=== Movement ===
The brown wood rail appears to be a year-round resident throughout its range.

=== Feeding ===
Nothing is known about the brown wood rail's foraging methods or diet.

=== Breeding ===
The brown wood rail's breeding season in Ecuador spans at least February to April. Nests there were bulk open cups made of large dead leaves and bits of vine. Their placement varied, being on stumps, on branch or vine tangles, and in understory shrubs between 1.2 and 2.6 m (4 and 9 ft) above the ground. The clutch size was two to four eggs and the incubation period was at least 19 days. In dimensions, the eggs measure about 4–7 cm (1.6–2.8 in) in length and 3–5 cm (1.2–2.0 in) in width.

=== Vocalization ===
One call of the brown wood rail is a repeated "kui-co-mui".

== Status ==
The IUCN originally assessed the brown wood rail as Threatened, and from 1994–2025 considered it to be Vulnerable. As of 2025, it has been downlisted to Least Concern due to its very large range. While population size is unknown, it is believed to be decreasing due to destruction of its mangrove habitats for agricultural use.
