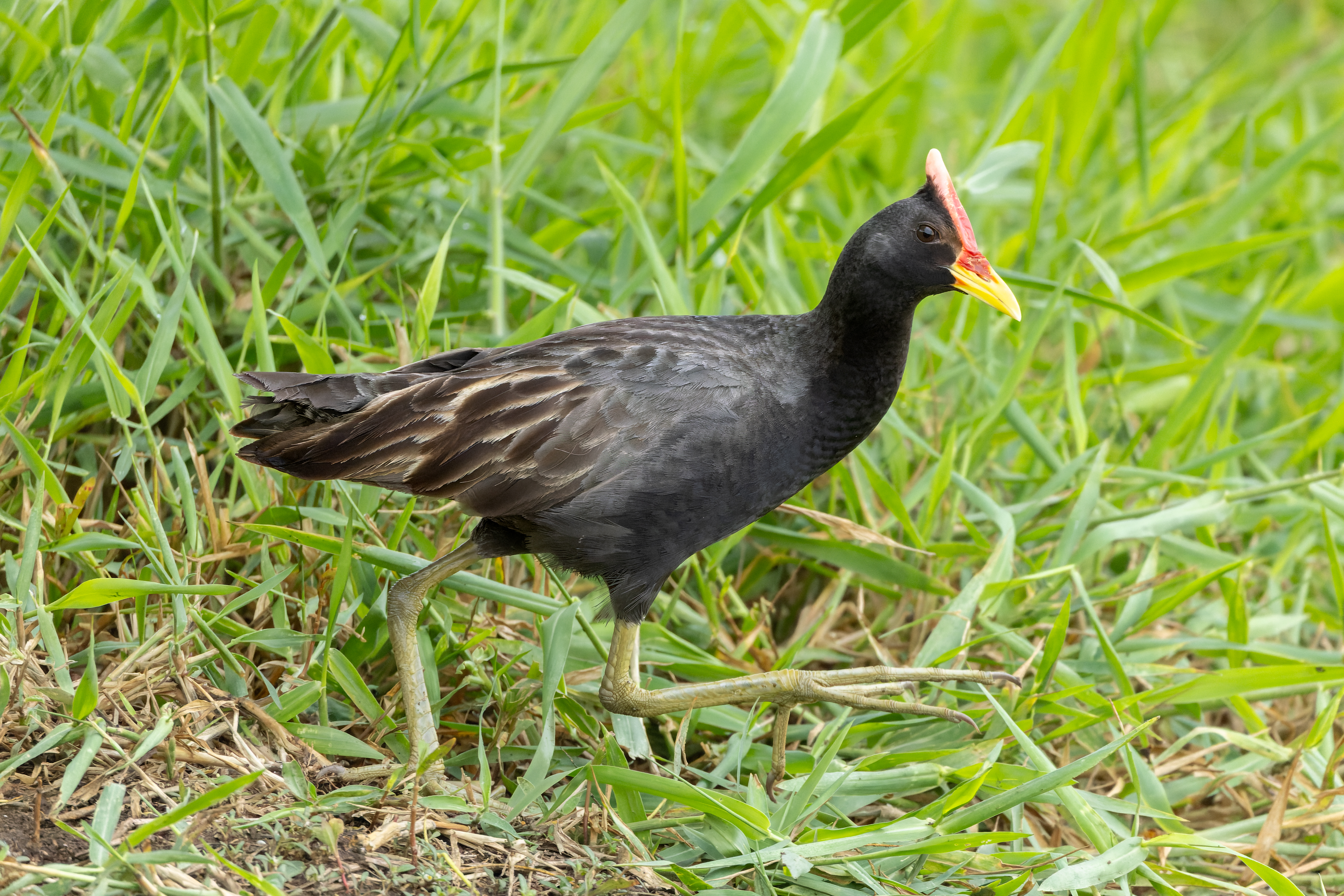
- Watercock (Gallicrex cinerea) male in Bhigwan, Maharashtra, India.

Conservation status
- Least Concern (IUCN 3.1)

Scientific classification
- Kingdom: Animalia
- Phylum: Chordata
- Class: Aves
- Order: Gruiformes
- Family: Rallidae
- Genus: Gallicrex; Blyth, 1852
- Species: G. cinerea

Binomial name
- Gallicrex cinerea (Gmelin, JF, 1789)

= Watercock =

Species of bird

The watercock (Gallicrex cinerea) is a waterbird in the rail and crake family, Rallidae that is widely distributed across Southeast Asia. It is the only member of the genus Gallicrex.

== Taxonomy ==
The watercock was formally described in 1789 by the German naturalist Johann Friedrich Gmelin in his revised and expanded edition of Carl Linnaeus's Systema Naturae. He placed it with the coots in the genus Fulica and coined the binomial name Fulica cinerea. Gmelin based his description on the "crested gallinule" from China that had been described in 1785 by the English ornithologist John Latham in his A General Synopsis of Birds. The watercock is now the only species placed in the genus Gallicrex that was introduced in 1852 by Edward Blyth. The genus name combines the genus Gallus with the genus Crex. The specific epithet cinerea is from the Latin cinereus meaning "ash-grey". The species is monotypic: no subspecies are recognised.

Traditionally held to be closely related to moorhens (which the adult male visually closely resembles), it is actually a member of a mostly tropical Asian clade containing also Aenigmatolimnas, Amaurornis, Himantornis and Megacrex.

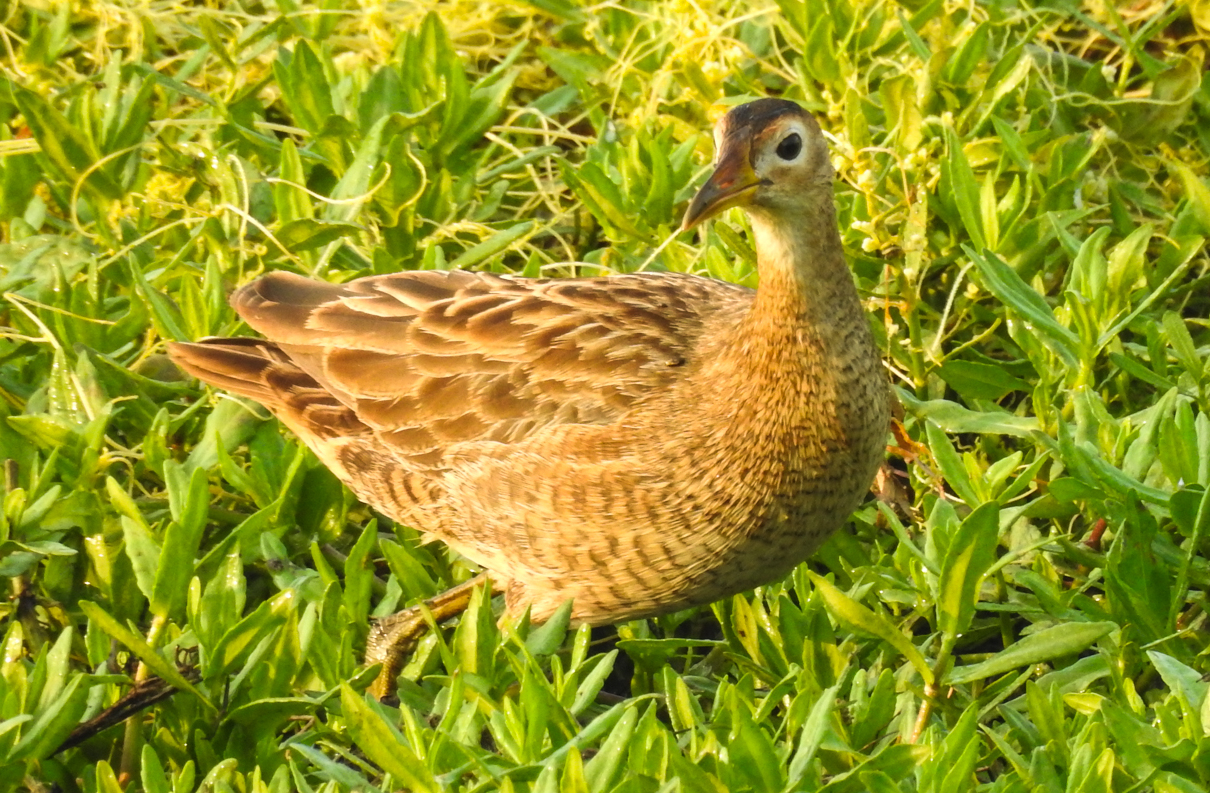
An immature

== Description ==
Adult male watercocks are 43 cm (17 in) long and weigh 476–650 g (1.049–1.433 lb). They have mainly black-grey plumage with red legs, bill, extended frontal shield and horn. Young males are buff in colour, darkening as they mature. Their bill is yellow and their legs are green. Female birds are smaller at 36 cm (14 in) and 298–434 g (10.5–15.3 oz). They are dark brown above and paler below. Their plumage is streaked and barred with darker markings. The bill is yellow and the legs are green. The downy chicks are black, as with all rails. The body of this rail is flattened laterally to allow easier passage through the reeds or undergrowth. It has long toes and a short tail.

Watercock are quite secretive, but are sometimes seen out in the open. They are noisy birds, especially at dawn and dusk, with a loud, gulping call.

== Distribution and habitat ==
Their breeding habitat is swamps across south Asia from India, Pakistan, and Sri Lanka to south China, Korea, Japan, Philippines and Indonesia. These large rails are mainly permanent residents throughout their range.

== Molting ==
About their molting is less known. Probably their feathers are dropped at the same time. By a specimen in Shandong in November, a strongly advanced molt of body feathers was noticed, while the feathers are complete.

== Behaviour and ecology ==
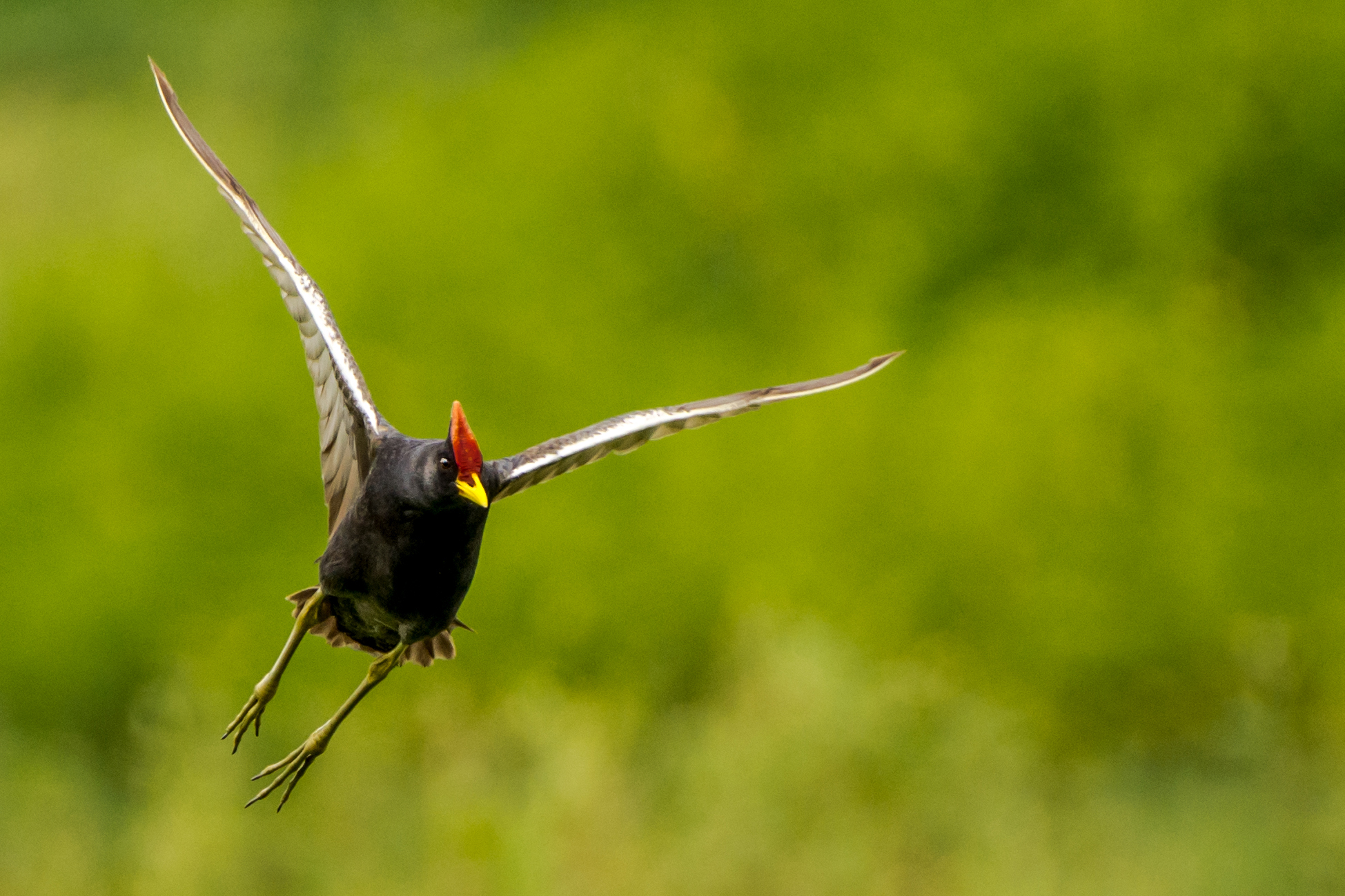
Watercock in flight, Dhaka, Bangladesh

=== Breeding ===
They nest in a dry location on the ground in marsh vegetation, laying 3-6 eggs.

=== Food and feeding ===
These birds probe with their bill in mud or shallow water, also picking up food by sight. They mainly eat insects and small fish and seeds. They forage on the ground.

== Gallery ==
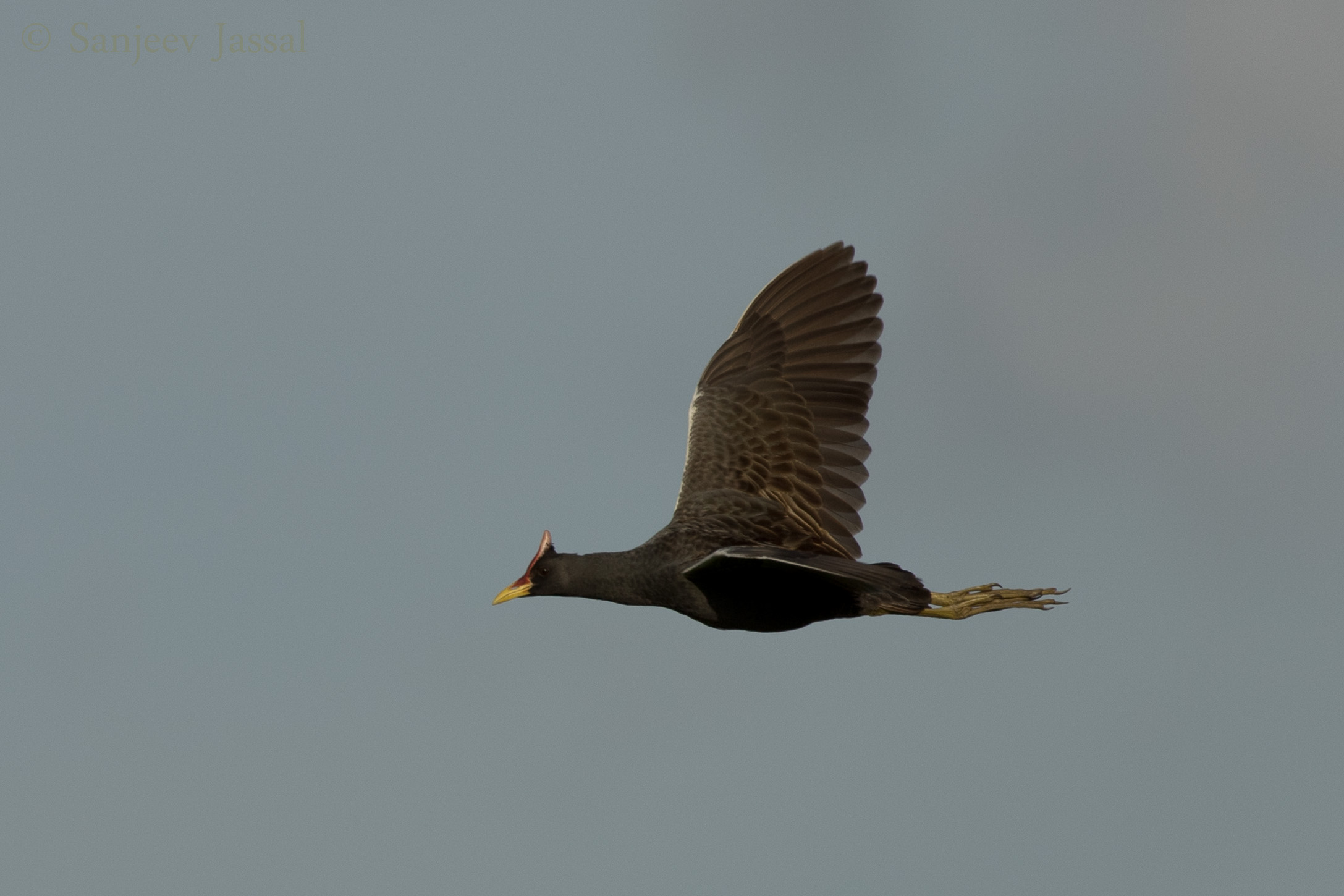
Watercock in flight

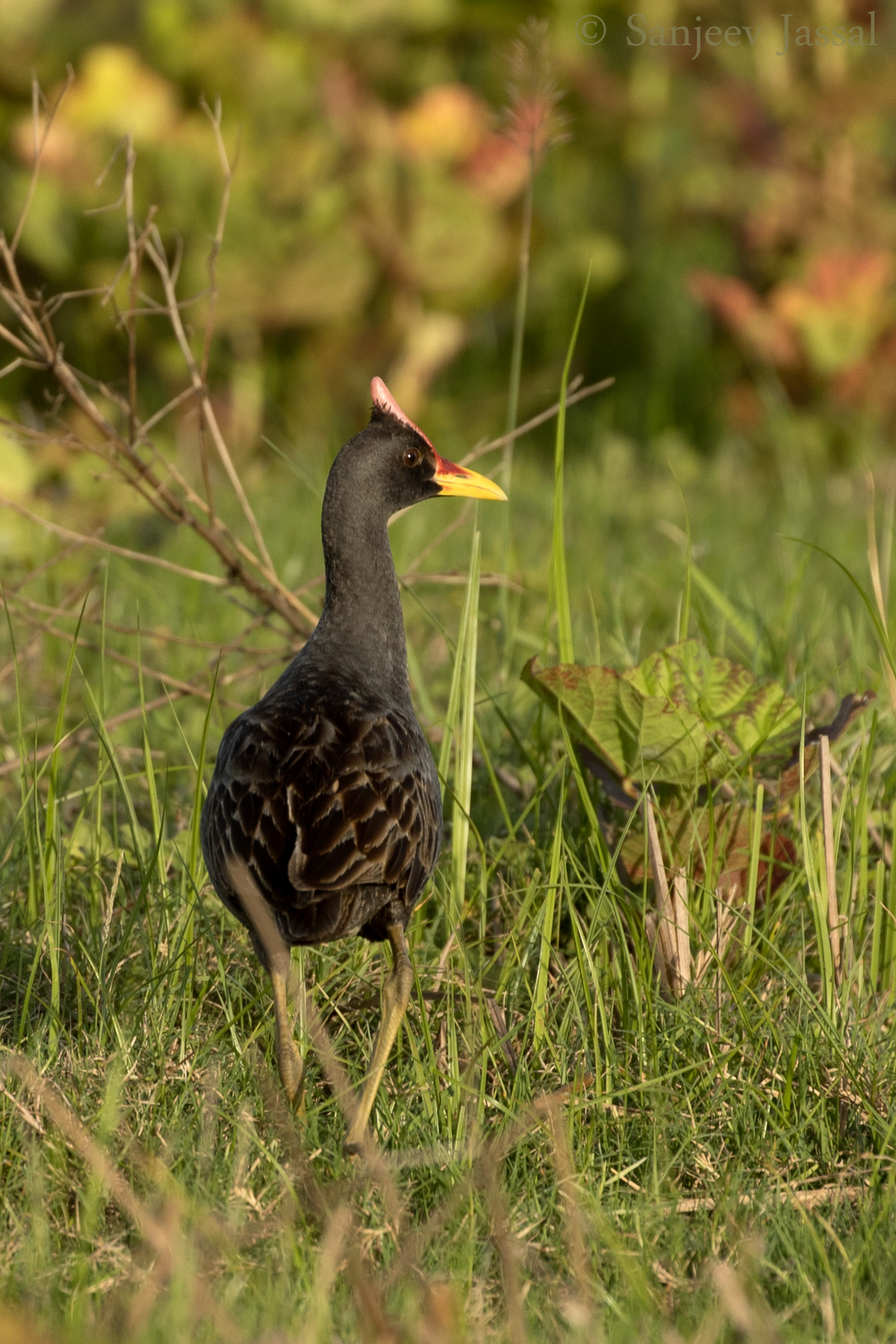
Watercock - rear view
