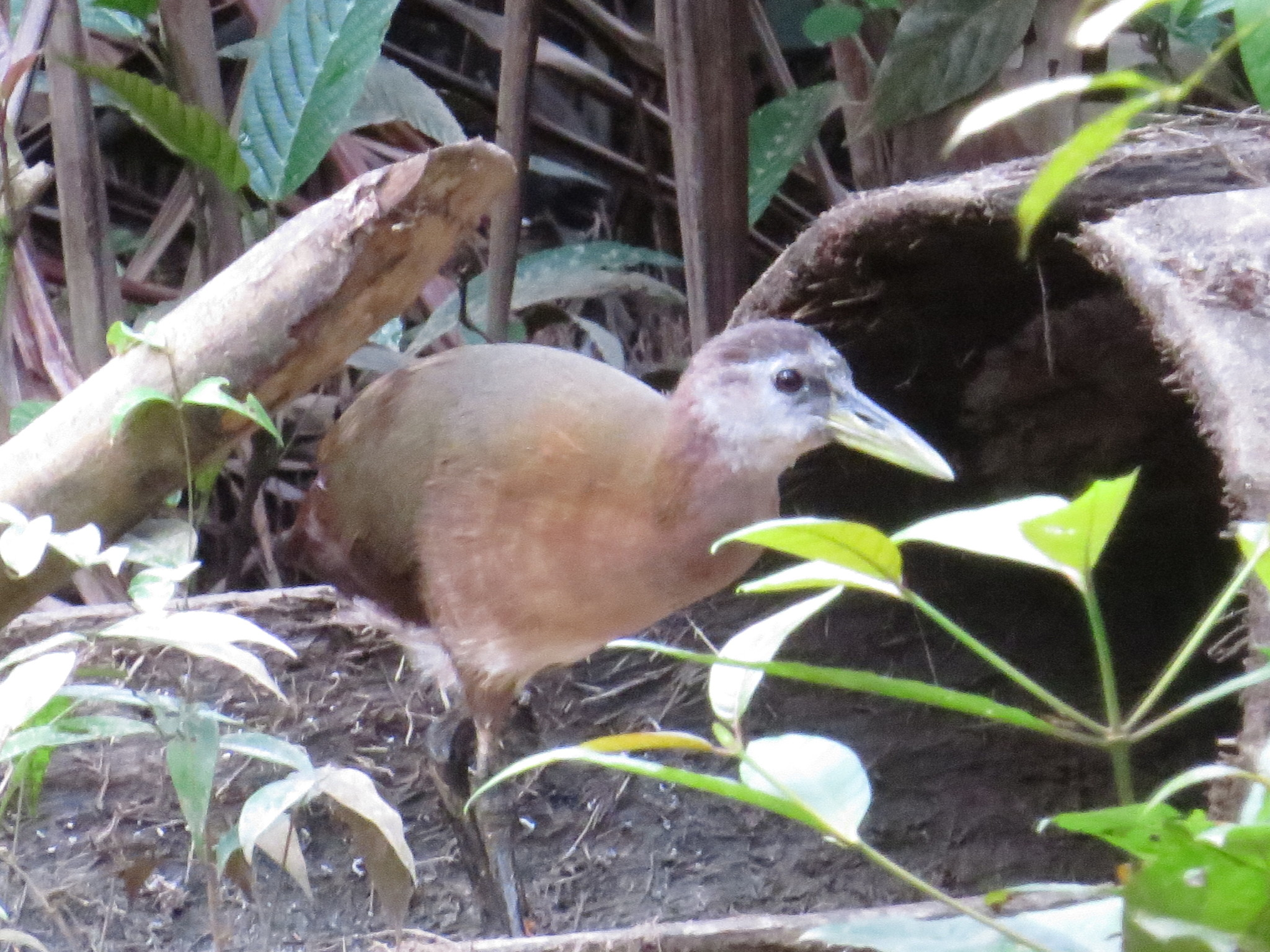

Conservation status
- Least Concern (IUCN 3.1)

Scientific classification
- Kingdom: Animalia
- Phylum: Chordata
- Class: Aves
- Order: Gruiformes
- Family: Rallidae
- Genus: Megacrex; D'Albertis & Salvadori, 1879
- Species: M. inepta

Binomial name
- Megacrex inepta d'Albertis & Salvadori, 1879

Synonyms
- Amaurornis ineptus (D'Albertis & Salvadori, 1879); Habroptila inepta (D'Albertis & Salvadori, 1879)

= New Guinea flightless rail =

Species of bird

The New Guinea flightless rail (Megacrex inepta), also known as the Papuan flightless rail, is a species of bird in the family Rallidae, in the monotypic genus Megacrex. Sometimes however, it was included in Amaurornis or Habroptila, but this is incorrect.

== Distribution and habitat ==
It is sparsely found across New Guinea. Its natural habitats are subtropical or tropical moist lowland forests, subtropical or tropical mangrove forests, and subtropical or tropical swamps. It is threatened by habitat loss.

== Systematics and evolution ==
M. inepta is indeed closely related to Amaurornis, but not as close as to warrant inclusion therein. Rather, it is part of a group including the core group of the polyphyletic Amaurornis, as well as the monotypic genera Aenigmatolimnas (striped crake), Gallicrex (Watercock) and Himantornis (Nkulengu rail). Most of these rails occur in tropical Asia. The Nkulengu rail from the tropical rainforests of Africa is particularly interesting with regard to the New Guinea flightless rail, as its habitat is quite similar but it is so much unlike other rails to have been separated as a distinct subfamily in earlier times. Instead, these two species seem to be ancient divergences that independently expanded westwards and southeastwards from the group's ancestral range, and diverged strongly in some aspects, while otherwise adapting in similar ways.
