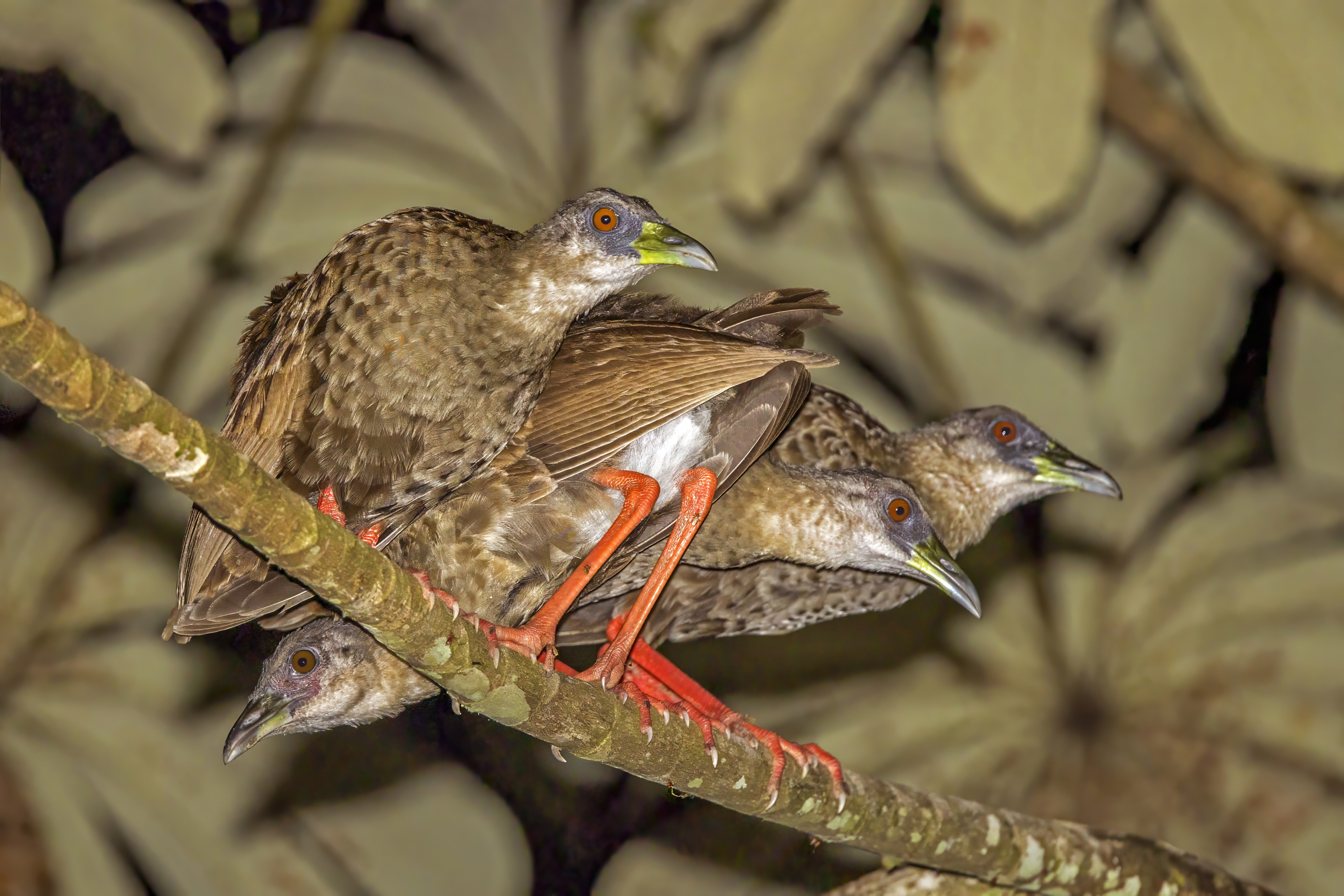
- in Ankasa Forest Reserve, Ghana

Conservation status
- Least Concern (IUCN 3.1)

Scientific classification
- Kingdom: Animalia
- Phylum: Chordata
- Class: Aves
- Order: Gruiformes
- Family: Rallidae
- Genus: Himantornis; Hartlaub, 1855
- Species: H. haematopus

Binomial name
- Himantornis haematopus Hartlaub, 1855

= Nkulengu rail =

Species of bird

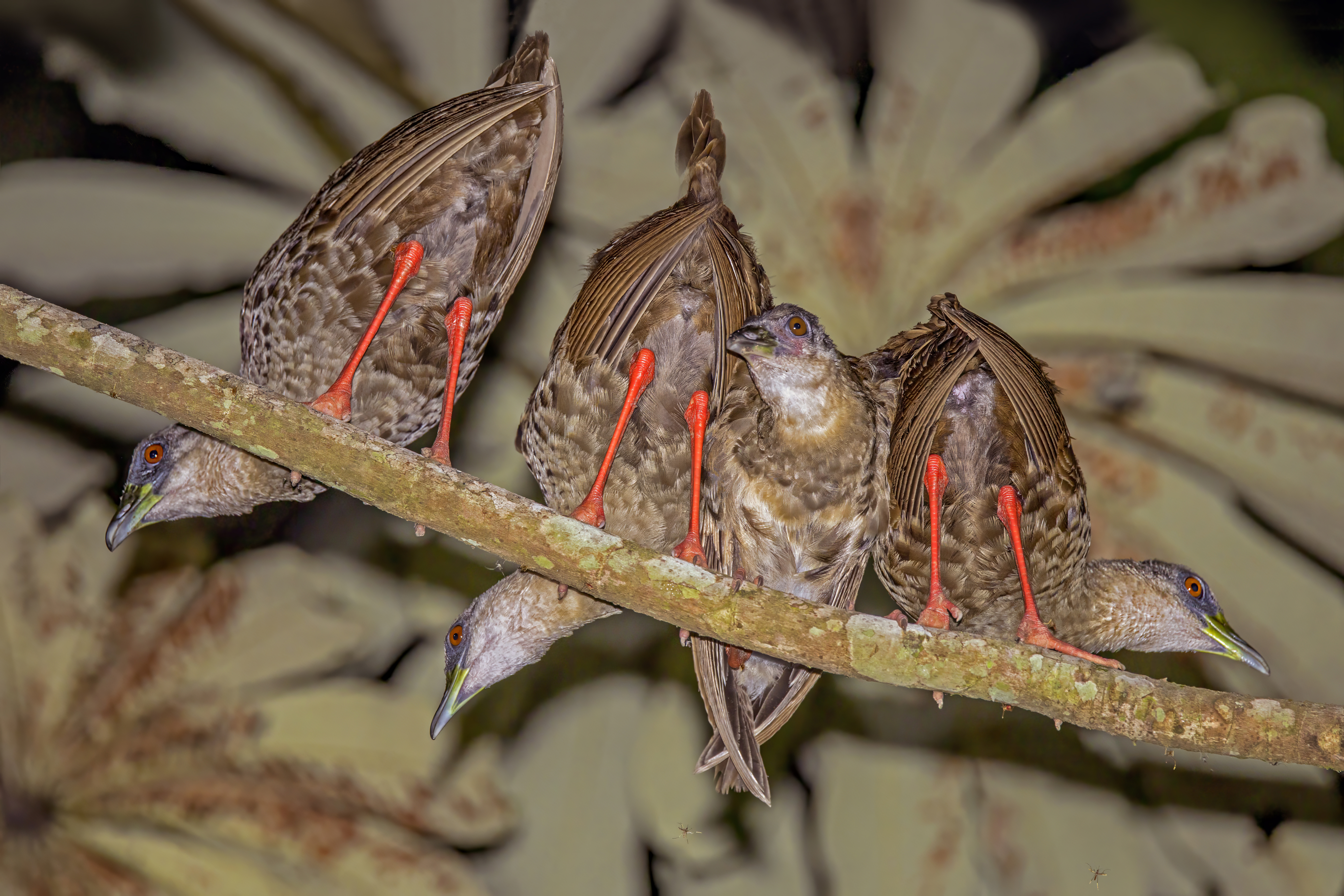
The same four birds

The Nkulengu rail (Himantornis haematopus) is a species of bird in the family Rallidae. It belongs to the monotypic genus Himantornis.

For long, this singular rail was considered a member of a distinct subfamily Himantornithinae. This was based on the assumption that it was a sort of "living fossil", as it resembles other Gruiformes rather than other rails in many traits. But as it seems, the supposed plesiomorphies are actually atavistic or otherwise re-evolved traits in reaction to its African rainforest habitat. Its closest living relatives seem to be the Asian genera Amaurornis, Gallicrex, Megacrex, and the widespread African Aenigmatolimnas, with Megacrex and Himantornis representing ancient and ecologically quite similar lineages at the extreme ends of the group's distribution. However a later genetic study found that it was basal to the radiation containing Porzana, Tribonyx, Gallinula and Fulica.

It is found in Angola, Cameroon, Central African Republic, Republic of the Congo, Democratic Republic of the Congo, Ivory Coast, Equatorial Guinea, Gabon, Ghana, Guinea, Liberia, Nigeria, Sierra Leone, Togo, and Uganda.

It is notoriously difficult to visually observe, preferring to hide, but has a loud and distinctive call often made in pairs.
