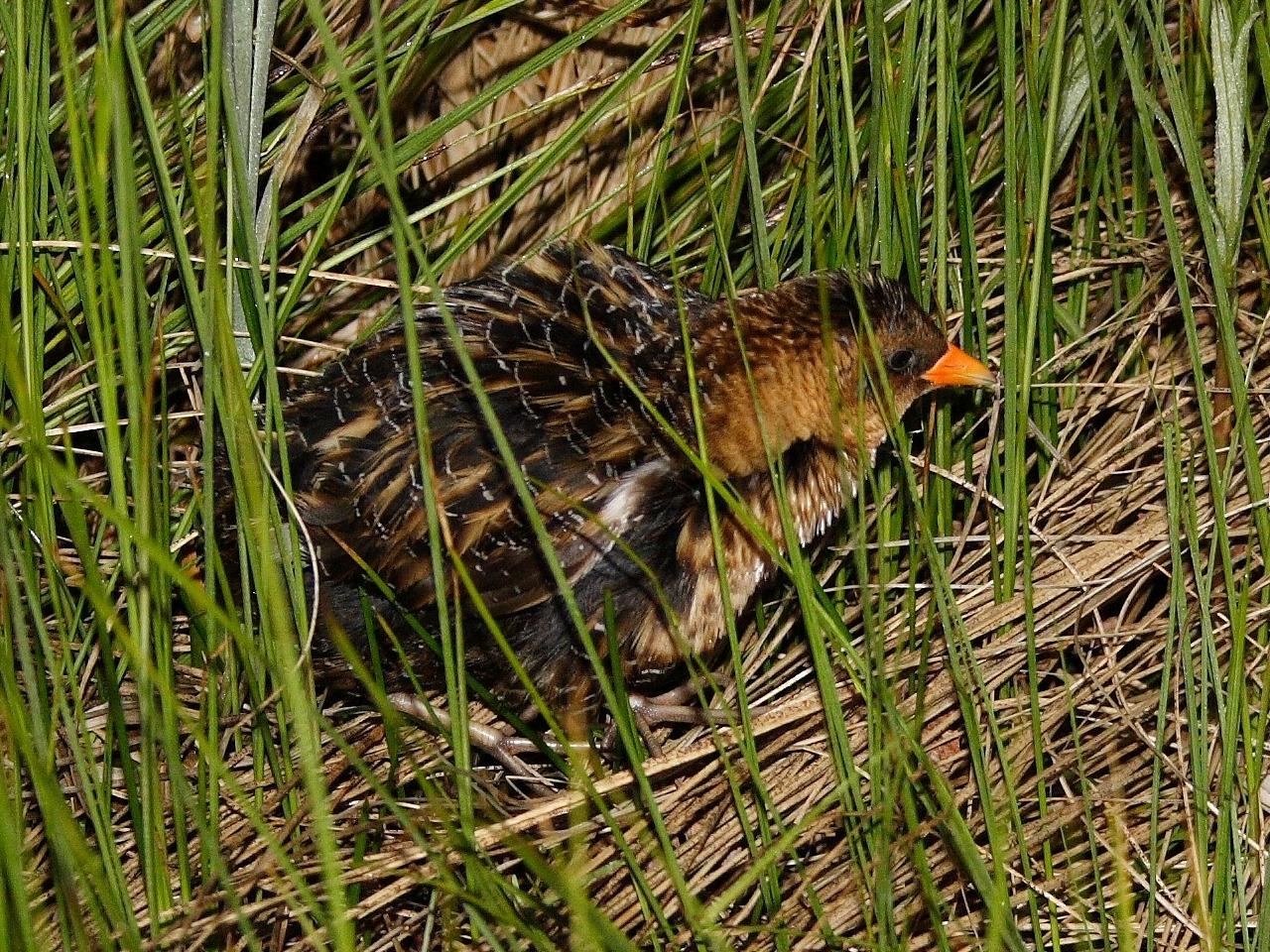

Conservation status
- Least Concern (IUCN 3.1)

Scientific classification
- Kingdom: Animalia
- Phylum: Chordata
- Class: Aves
- Order: Gruiformes
- Family: Rallidae
- Genus: Coturnicops
- Species: C. noveboracensis

Binomial name
- Coturnicops noveboracensis (Gmelin, JF, 1789)

Subspecies
- C. n. noveboracensis (Gmelin, JF, 1789); C. n. goldmani (Nelson, 1904)
- Breeding Migration Nonbreeding

Audio

= Yellow rail =

Species of bird

The yellow rail (Coturnicops noveboracensis) is a small secretive marsh bird of the family Rallidae that is found in North America.

== Taxonomy ==
The yellow rail was formally described in 1789 by the German naturalist Johann Friedrich Gmelin in his revised and expanded edition of Carl Linnaeus's Systema Naturae. He placed it with all the coots in the genus Fulica and coined the binomial name Fulica noveboracensis. Gmelin based his description on the "yellow breasted gallinule" that had been briefly described in 1785 by the Welsh naturalist Thomas Pennant in his book Arctic Zoology. The yellow rail is now placed in the genus Coturnicops that was erected in 1855 by the English zoologist George Robert Gray. The genus name combines coturnix, the Latin word for a "quail", with ōps, an Ancient Greek word meaning "appearance". The specific epithet noveboracensis is Latin for New York (novus means "new" and Eboracum is York, England).

Two subspecies are recognised:

- C. n. noveboracensis (Gmelin, JF, 1789) – Canada and north USA
- † C. n. goldmani (Nelson, 1904) – central Mexico (extinct)

== Description ==
Adults have brown upperparts streaked with black, a yellowish-brown breast, a light belly and barred flanks. The short thick dark bill turns yellow in males during the breeding season. The feathers on the back are edged with white. There is a yellow-brown band over the eye and the legs are greenish-yellow. The birds measure 16–19 cm (6.3–7.5 in) in overall length; males have an average weight of 59 g (2.1 oz), females an average weight of 52 g (1.8 oz).

== Distribution and habitat ==
The nominate subspecies' breeding habitat is wet meadows, fens and shallow marshes across Canada east of the Rockies; also the northeastern United States and the entire northern Canada–US border Great Plains to the Great Lakes. These northern populations of yellow rail migrate to the southeastern coastal United States. Little is known about the yellow rail's winter habits beyond sites along coastal Texas, southeast Oklahoma, and coastal South Carolina. However, researchers have concluded through observational studies that the relative abundance of yellow rails increased in relation to the size of the area surveyed and was higher at sites burned within 3 years. Across sites, each additional hour of survey effort increased the number of birds detected by 0.66 rails/h. Findings indicate yellow rails overwinter in wet pine savanna habitats along the northern Gulf Coast region.

The subspecies Coturnicops noveboracensis goldmani is known only from marshes on the upper Río Lerma (Lerma River) around 2,500 m in elevation in State of Mexico, Mexico, where it was last recorded in 1964.

== Behaviour ==
The yellow rail are very elusive and seldom seen. They generally call at night resembling the sound of two stones being clicked together "tik-tik tik-tik-tik" in repetition. When approached, they are more likely to rely on camouflage and escaping on foot through dense vegetation, rather than flushing.

=== Breeding ===
The nest is a shallow cup built with marsh vegetation on damp ground under a canopy of dead plants. It is made out of woven grasses and leaves.

This rail lays a clutch of five to 10 oval or elongate eggs that usually measure around 29 by 21 millimetres (1.14 by 0.83 in). These eggs are creamy, and spotted with both reddish spots that form a ring at one end, and small black spots that are scattered over the egg. They are incubated by the female for a period of 16 to 18 days. If the first set of eggs are destroyed, the female will generally lay another clutch. After the chicks hatch, the female will either crush the eggshells and hide them from view at the bottom of the nest, or remove the eggshells from the nest, dropping them along the paths leading away from the nest.

=== Food and feeding ===
The yellow rail feeds primarily on small invertebrates and complements its diet with plant seeds. Beetles (Coleoptera) account for the highest proportion of the birds' diet, followed by spiders (Araneae) and snails (Gastropods), whereas plant matter is dominated by sedges (Cyperaceae) and rushes (Juncaceae).

== Status ==
Their numbers have declined in recent years due to loss of habitat. However, in 2021 a survey using autonomous sound recorders in the Edéhzhíe Protected Area in Canada's Northwest Territories, 150 kilometres (93 mi) outside the species' known range, reported an estimated population of 906 breeding pairs, which may suggest that the species is more widespread than previously thought.
