= Lake Kwangpo =

Lake in North Korea

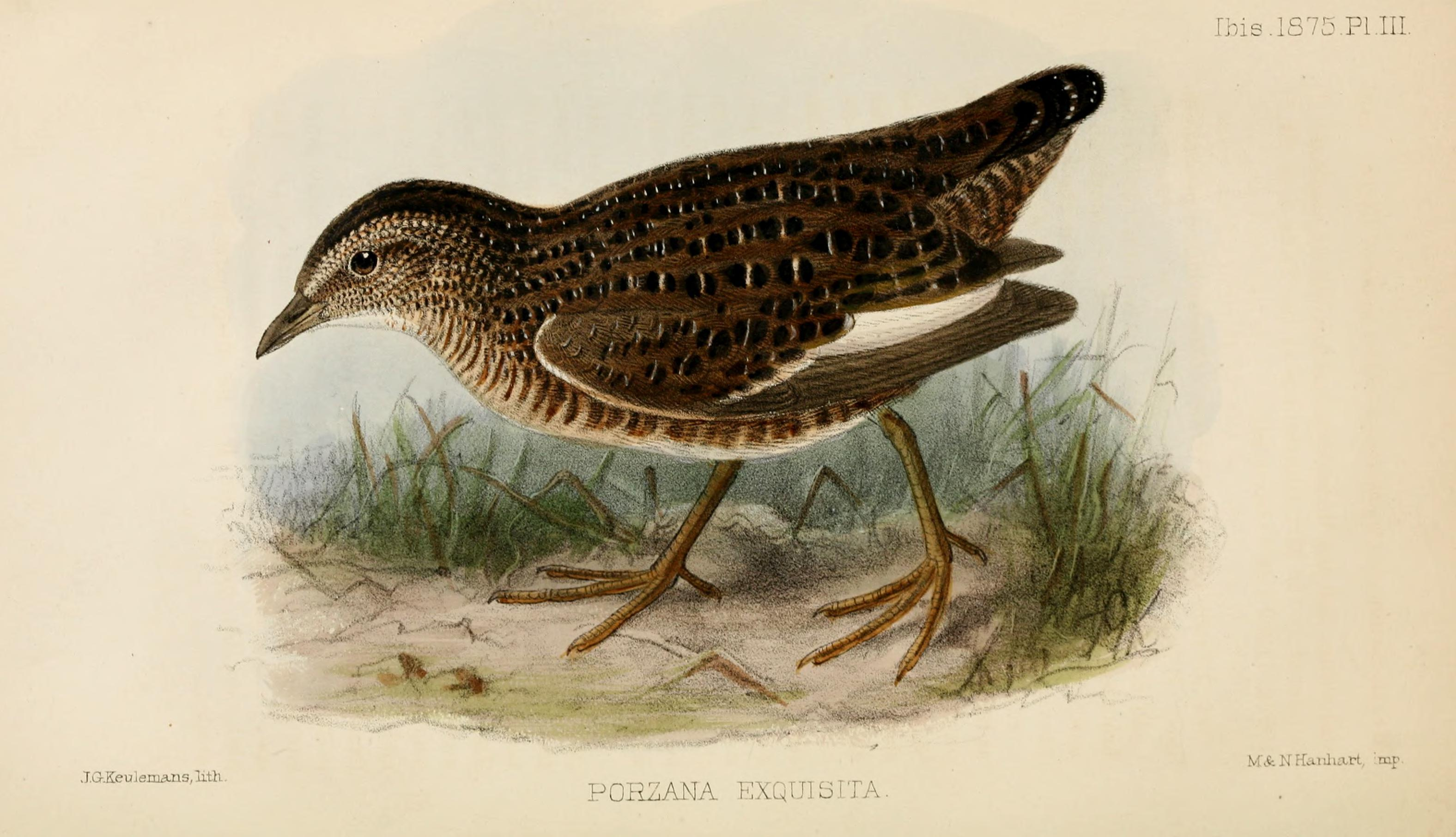
- The lake is an important site for Swinhoe's rails

- Location within North Korea
- Location: South Hamgyong Province, North Korea
- Coordinates: 39°46′00″N 127°28′00″E

Lake Kwangpo lies near the coast of South Hamgyong Province of North Korea. A 4,500 hectares (11,000 acres) site encompassing the lake, including adjacent rice paddies and the 2,000-hectare (4,900-acre) Lake Kwangpo Protected Area, has been identified by BirdLife International as an Important Bird Area (IBA) because it supports populations of various water- and wetland birds. Birds for which the site is of conservation significance include swan geese, greater white-fronted geese, mute swans, whooper swans, grey herons, Swinhoe's rails, white-naped cranes and red-crowned cranes.
