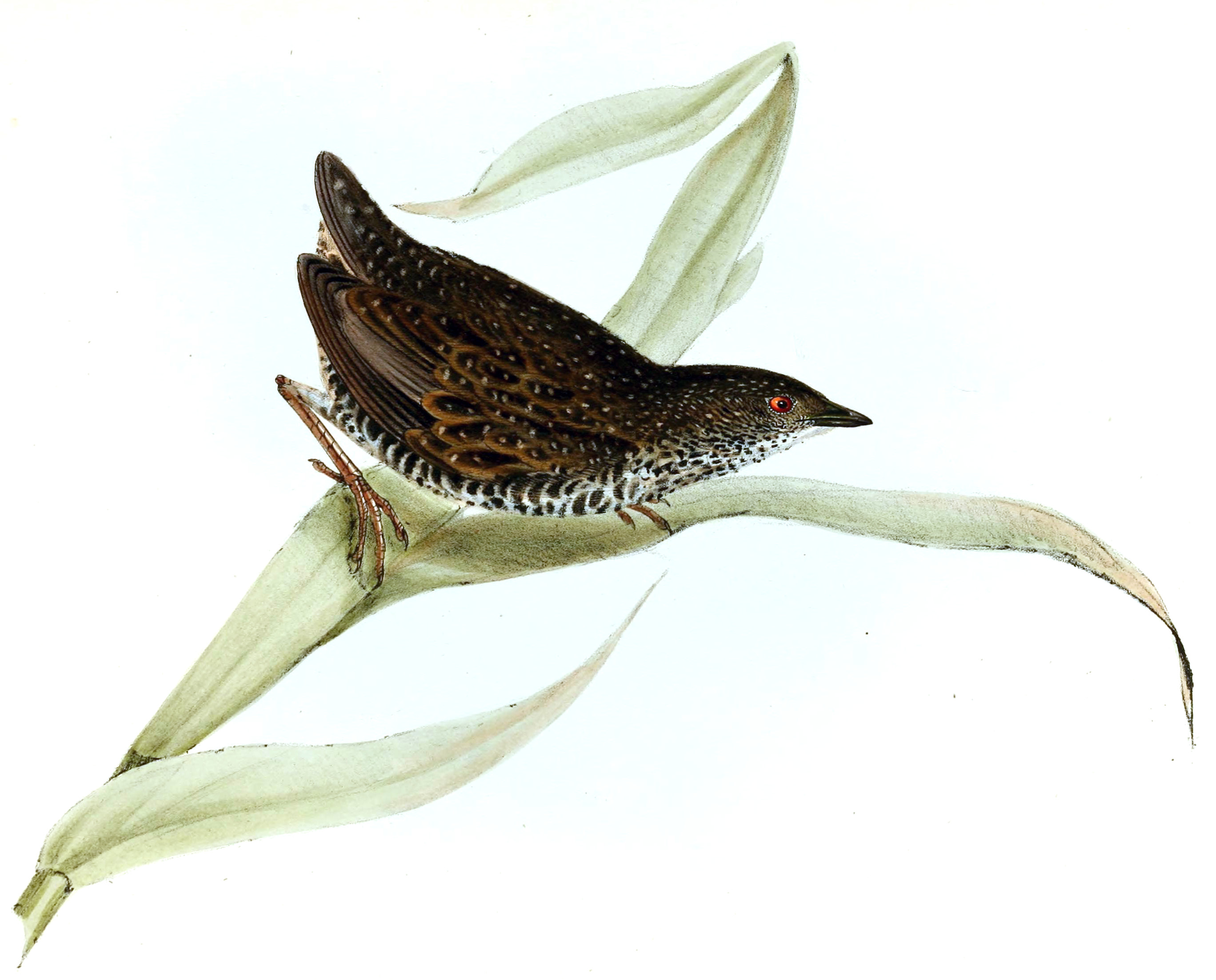
- Illustration by Elizabeth Gould, 1841
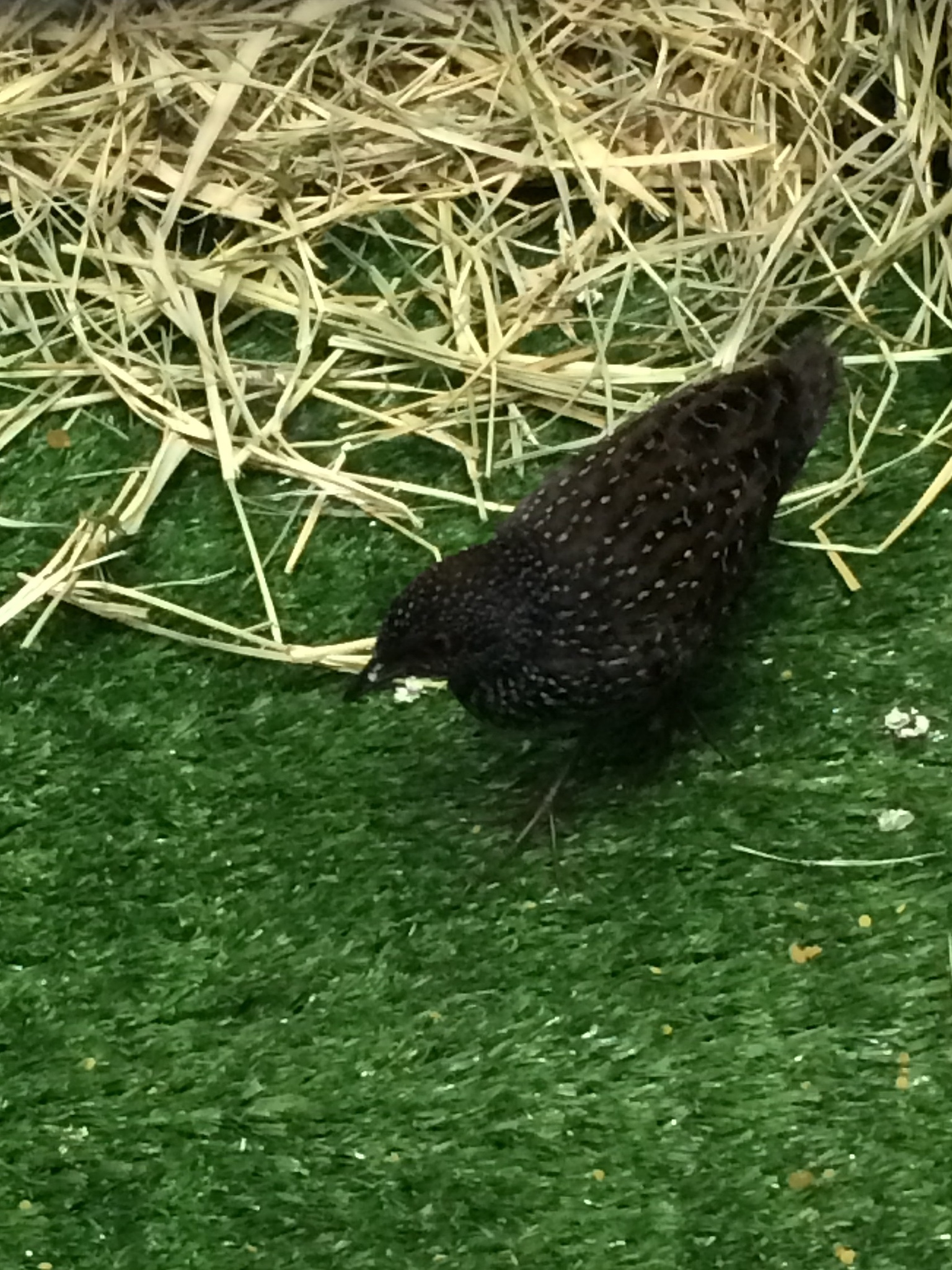

Conservation status
- Least Concern (IUCN 3.1)

Scientific classification
- Kingdom: Animalia
- Phylum: Chordata
- Class: Aves
- Order: Gruiformes
- Family: Rallidae
- Genus: Laterallus
- Species: L. notatus

Binomial name
- Laterallus notatus (Gould, 1841)

Synonyms
- Zapornia notata (protonym); Coturnicops notatus

= Speckled rail =

Species of bird

The speckled rail (Laterallus notatus), also called speckled crake, is a species of bird in subfamily Rallinae of family Rallidae, the rails, gallinules, and coots. It is found in Argentina, Brazil, Guyana, Paraguay, Uruguay, and Venezuela. This species was formerly placed in the genus Coturnicops.

== Taxonomy ==
The speckled rail was formally described in 1841 under the binomial name Zapornia notata by the English ornithologist John Gould in his contribution to Charles Darwin's book, Zoology of the Voyage of H.M.S. Beagle. The book included an illustration by Gould's wife Elizabeth. The specimen had been shot from the deck of the Beagle in the Río de la Plata in Argentina. The speckled rail was formerly placed in the genus Coturnicops but has been moved to Laterallus based on a 2023 a molecular phylogenetic study found that the species is more closely related to members of that genus. The genus name is a portmanteau of Rallus lateralis, a synonym of the binomial name for the rufous-sided crake. The specific epithet notatus is Latin meaning "spotted", "marked" or "marked out". The species is monotypic: no subspecies are recognised.

== Description ==
The speckled rail is 13 to 14 cm (5.1 to 5.5 in) long and weighs about 30 g (1.1 oz). The sexes are alike. Adults have very dark brown plumage with white spots on their upperparts and white bars on their underparts.

As of late 2022 xeno-canto had no recordings of speckled rail vocalizations and the Cornell Lab of Ornithology's Macaulay Library had only two. The species has a "kooweee-cack" call, a whistled "keeee" alarm call, and a high "kyu" whose purpose is unknown.

== Distribution and habitat ==
The speckled rail's core range is southern Paraguay, southern Brazil, eastern Argentina, and Uruguay. It is also found in Guyana and Venezuela and as a vagrant in Colombia. Undocumented sight records in Bolivia and the Falkland Islands lead the South American Classification Committee of the American Ornithological Society (SACC) to class it as hypothetical in those countries. It primarily inhabits dense marshes, swamps, grassy savanna, and rice and alfalfa fields but is also found in the edges of humid woodland. In elevation it ranges from sea level to 1,500 m (4,900 ft).

Some authors propose that the speckled rail is migratory, breeding in the south and wintering in the north. However, there are many records of birds in Brazil, Paraguay, and Uruguay during the austral winter, and birds in breeding condition have been noted in Venezuela. The SACC does not have breeding records from Guyana but notes it as breeding in the four countries of its core range and in Venezuela.

== Behavior ==
=== Food and feeding ===
Almost nothing is known about the speckled rail's foraging technique or diet. The latter is known to include grass seeds and arthropods.

=== Breeding ===
The speckled rail's breeding season is mostly unknown; in the south it appears to include December and in Venezuela August. Nothing else is known about its breeding biology.

== Conservation status ==
The International Union for Conservation of Nature (IUCN) has assessed the speckled rail as being of Least Concern, though its population size is not known and is believed to be decreasing. No immediate threats have been identified. Records are very sparse; the species is assumed to be hard to find but "until further evidence is forthcoming, [it is] best considered genuinely rare."
