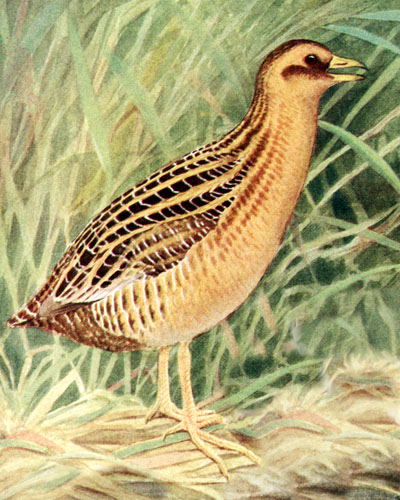
- Yellow rail (Coturnicops noveboracensis)

Scientific classification
- Kingdom: Animalia
- Phylum: Chordata
- Class: Aves
- Order: Gruiformes
- Family: Rallidae
- Genus: Coturnicops; G.R. Gray, 1855

Type species
- Fulica noveboracensis Gmelin, 1789

= Coturnicops =

Genus of birds

Coturnicops is a genus of bird in the rail family.

== Taxonomy ==
The genus was erected by the English zoologist George Robert Gray in 1855 with the yellow rail (Coturnicops noveboracensis) as the type species. The genus name combines coturnix, the Latin word for a "quail", with ōps, an Ancient Greek word meaning "appearance".

== Species ==
The genus contains the following two species:

Image	Common name	Scientific name	Distribution
	Swinhoe's rail	Coturnicops exquisitus	Manchuria and southeastern Siberia.
	Yellow rail	Coturnicops noveboracensis	Canada east of the Rockies; also the northeastern United States

The genus formerly included the speckled rail (Laterallus notatus).
