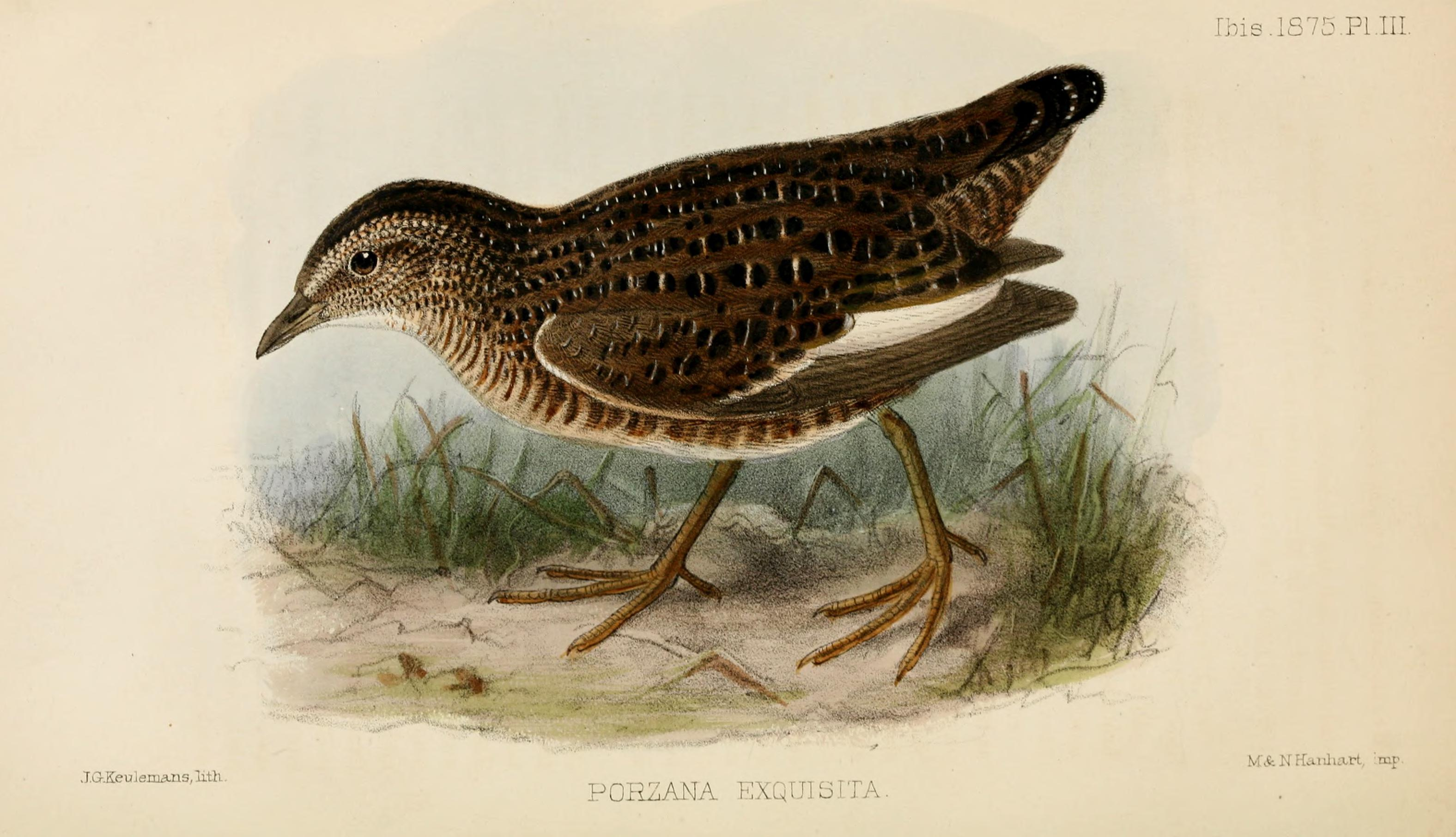

Conservation status
- Least Concern (IUCN 3.1)

Scientific classification
- Kingdom: Animalia
- Phylum: Chordata
- Class: Aves
- Order: Gruiformes
- Family: Rallidae
- Genus: Coturnicops
- Species: C. exquisitus

Binomial name
- Coturnicops exquisitus (R. Swinhoe, 1873)

= Swinhoe's rail =

Species of bird

Swinhoe's rail (Coturnicops exquisitus) is a species of bird in the family Rallidae occurring in northeastern Asia. It was known only in two locations in Manchuria and southeastern Siberia, separated by more than 1000 km; however, in 2018, a new breeding population was found in the Amur region, situated between the two. Its natural habitats are swamps, freshwater lakes, freshwater marshes, and arable land. It is the world's smallest rail at 13 cm (5.2 in) and 24.5 grams. It is threatened by habitat loss, though its population is now considered to be larger than previously believed, and is thus classified as Least Concern on the IUCN Red List.

The common name commemorates the British naturalist Robert Swinhoe who first described the species in 1873.
