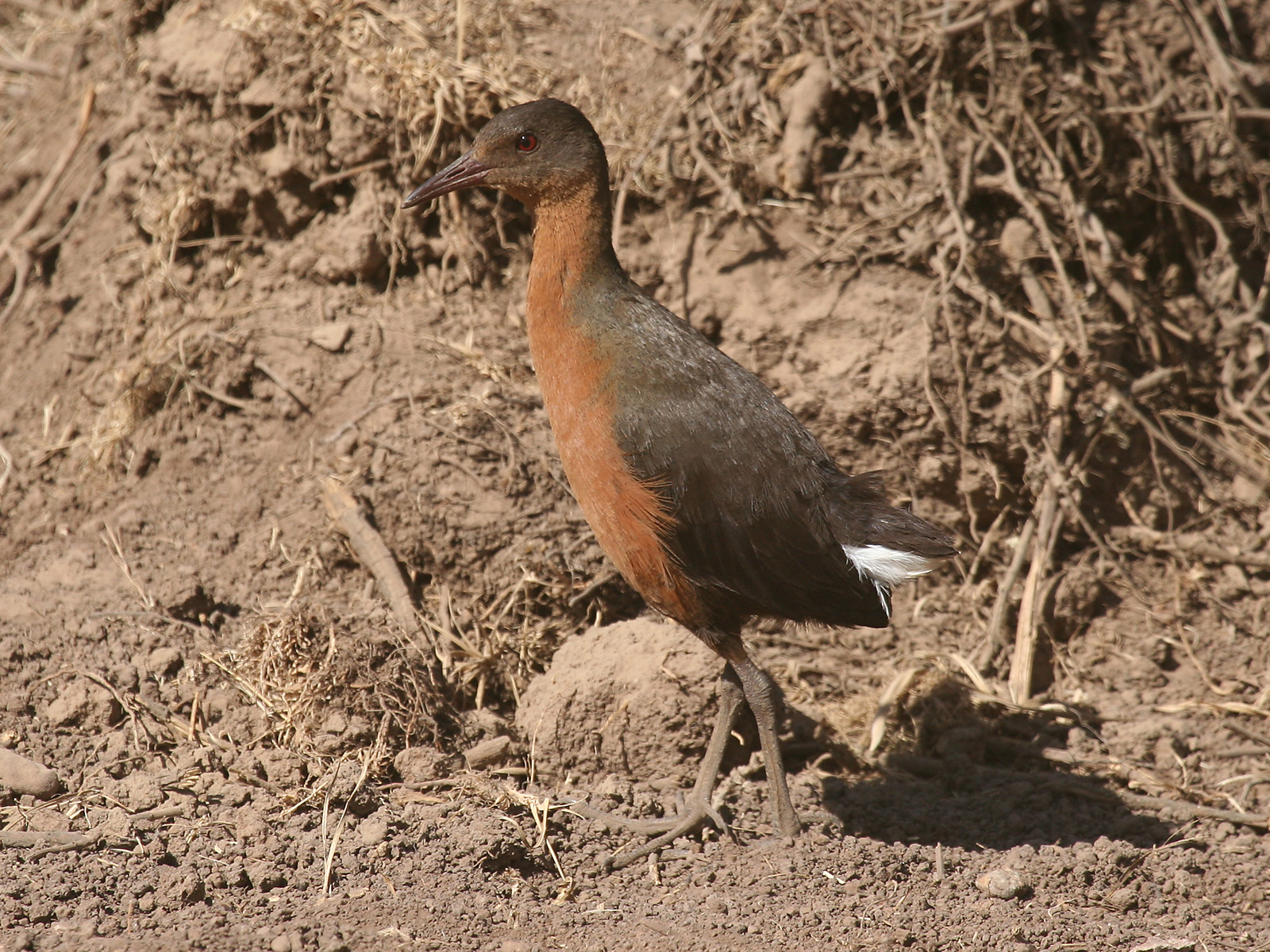

Conservation status
- Near Threatened (IUCN 3.1)

Scientific classification
- Kingdom: Animalia
- Phylum: Chordata
- Class: Aves
- Order: Gruiformes
- Family: Rallidae
- Genus: Rougetius; Bonaparte, 1856
- Species: R. rougetii

Binomial name
- Rougetius rougetii (Guérin-Méneville, 1843)

= Rouget's rail =

Species of bird

Rouget's rail (Rougetius rougetii) is a species of bird in the family Rallidae. It is the only member of the genus Rougetius. It is found in Eritrea and Ethiopia.

== Description ==
Rouget's rail is about 30 cm (12 in) long. In coloration, it has olive brown back, and cinnamon-rufous underside. Sexes are alike. One female and male weighed 170 g (6.0 oz) and 220 g (7.8 oz), respectively.

== Habitat and distribution ==
It inhabits the Ethiopian and Eritrean highlands at 2,000–4,100 m (6,600–13,500 ft) where it frequents moorland, grassland, and marshy areas.

== Behavior ==
The diet of Rouget's rail consists of seeds, aquatic insects (namely water beetles), crustaceans, and small snails.

It lays 4–5 eggs, which are incubated by the female and probably the male. Both parents raise the chicks, which remain with its parents until fully grown.
