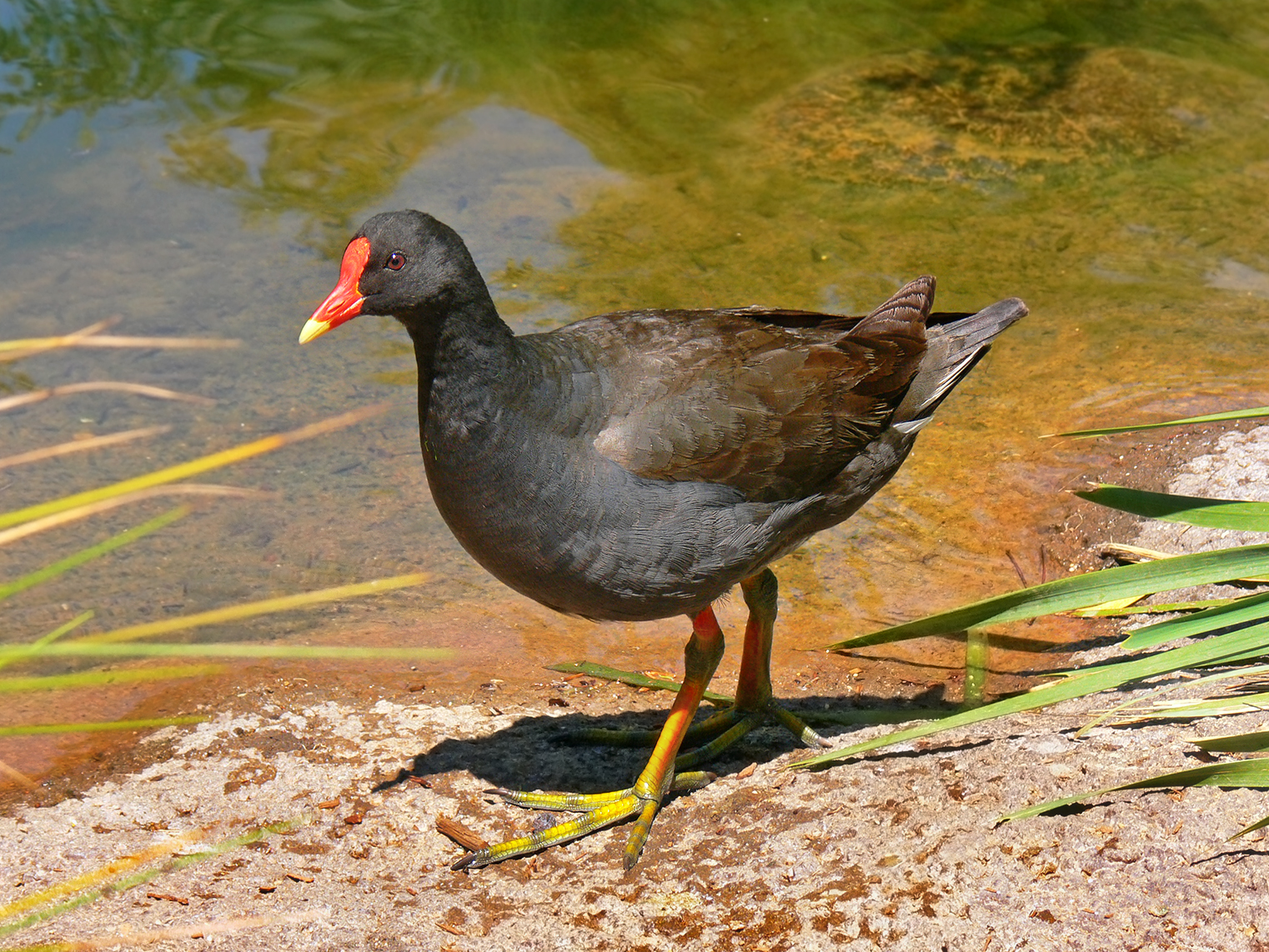
- Dusky moorhen, Gallinula tenebrosa

Scientific classification
- Kingdom: Animalia
- Phylum: Chordata
- Class: Aves
- Order: Gruiformes
- Family: Rallidae; Rafinesque, 1815

Genera
- Some 40 living, and see below.

= Rail (bird) =

Rails Temporal range: Early Eocene – Recent

Family of birds

Rails (avian family Rallidae) are a large, cosmopolitan family of small- to medium-sized terrestrial or semi-amphibious birds. The family exhibits considerable diversity in its forms, and includes such ubiquitous species as the crakes, coots, and gallinules; other rail species are extremely rare or endangered. Many are associated with wetland habitats, some being semi-aquatic like waterfowl (such as the coot), but many more are wading birds or shorebirds. The ideal rail habitats are marsh areas, including rice paddies, and flooded fields or open forest. They are especially fond of dense vegetation for nesting. The rail family is found in every terrestrial habitat with the exception of dry desert, polar or freezing regions, and alpine areas (above the snow line). Members of Rallidae occur on every continent except Antarctica. Numerous unique island species are known. The rails have suffered disproportionally from human changes to the environment, and an estimated several hundred species of island rails have become extinct because of this. Several island species of rails remain endangered, and conservation organisations and governments continue to work to prevent their extinction.

== Name ==
"Rail" is the anglicized respelling of the French râle, from Old French rasle. It is named from its harsh cry, in Vulgar Latin *rascula, from Latin rādere ("to scrape"). In the Old World, long-billed species tend to be called rails and short-billed species crakes. North American species are normally called rails irrespective of bill length. The larger species are also sometimes given other names. The black coots are more adapted to open water than their relatives, and some other large species are called gallinules and swamphens.

== Morphology ==
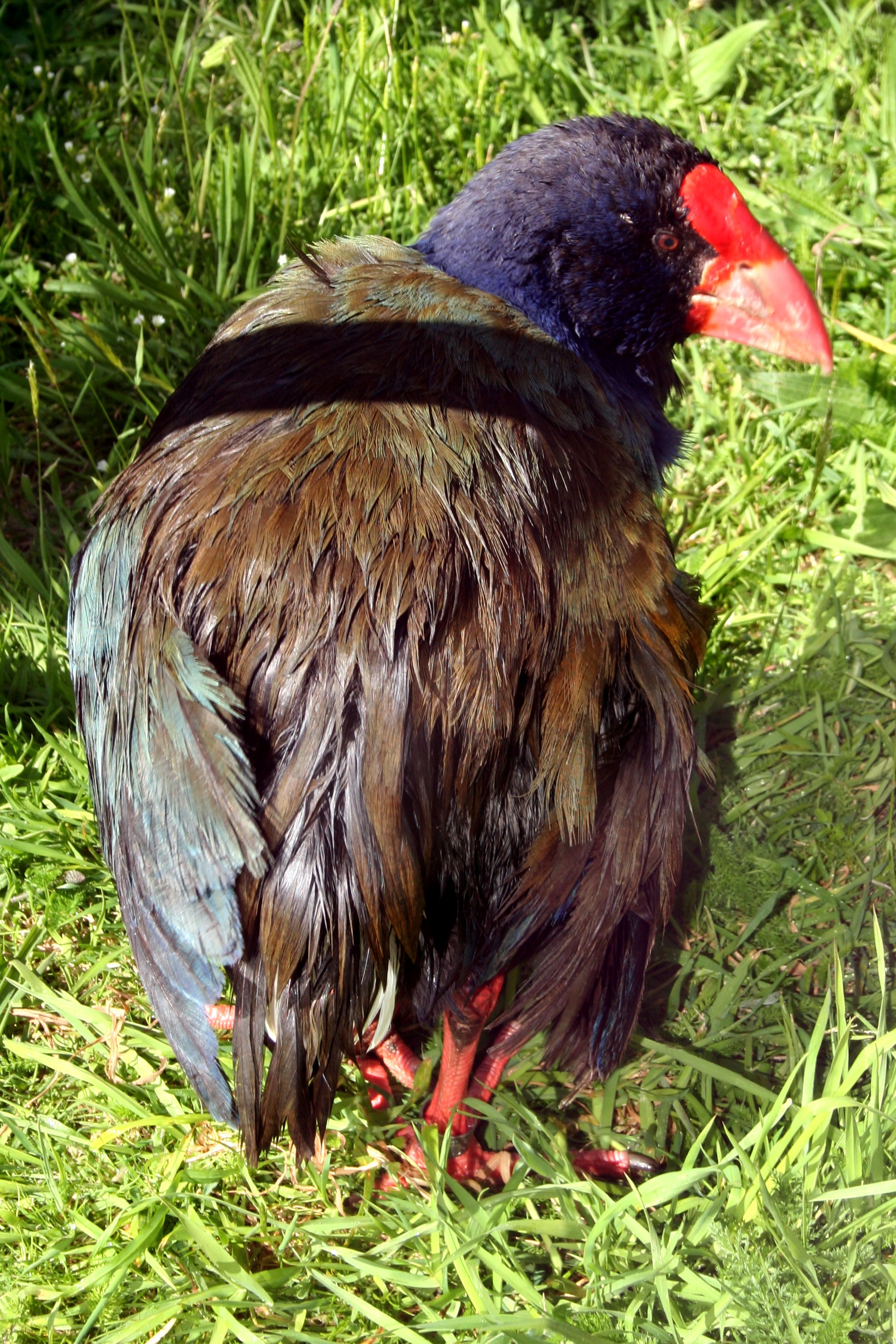
New Zealand South Island takahē (Porphyrio hochstetteri) from behind, showing the short, soft, and fluffy remiges typical of flightless rails

The rails are a family of small to medium-sized, ground-living birds. They vary in length from 12 to 63 cm (5 to 25 in) and in weight from 20 to 3,000 g (0.7 oz to 6 lb 10 oz). Some species have long necks and in many cases are laterally compressed.The smallest of these is Swinhoe's rail in East Asia, at 13 cm (5.1 in) and 25 g. The largest of this group is the takahē, at 65 cm (26 in) and 2.7 kg (6.0 lb).

The bill is the most variable feature within the family. In some species, it is longer than the head (like the clapper rail of the Americas); in others, it may be short and wide (as in the coots), or massive (as in the purple gallinules). A few coots and gallinules have a frontal shield, which is a fleshy, rearward extension of the upper bill. The most complex frontal shield is found in the horned coot.

Rails exhibit very little sexual dimorphism in either plumage or size. Two exceptions are the watercock (Gallicrex cinerea) and the little crake (Zapornia parva).

=== Flight and flightlessness ===
The wings of all rails are short and rounded. The flight of those Rallidae able to fly, while not powerful, can be sustained for long periods of time, and many species migrate annually. The weakness of their flight, however, means they are easily blown off course, thus making them common vagrants, a characteristic that has led them to colonize many isolated oceanic islands. Furthermore, these birds often prefer to run rather than fly, especially in dense habitat. Some are also flightless at some time during their moult periods.

Flightlessness in rails is one of the best examples of parallel evolution in the animal kingdom. Of the roughly 150 historically known rail species, 31 extant or recently extinct species evolved flightlessness from volant (flying) ancestors. This process created the endemic populations of flightless rails seen on Pacific islands today.

Many island rails are flightless because small island habitats without mammalian predators eliminate the need to fly or move long distances. Flight makes intense demands, with the keel and flight muscles taking up to 40% of a bird's weight. Reducing the flight muscles, with a corresponding lowering of metabolic demands, reduces the flightless rail's energy expenditures. For this reason, flightlessness makes it easier to survive and colonize an island where resources may be limited. This also allows for the evolution of multiple sizes of flightless rails on the same island as the birds diversify to fill niches.

In addition to energy conservation, certain morphological traits also affect rail evolution. Rails have relatively small flight muscles and wings to begin with. In rails, the flight muscles make up only 12–17% of their overall body mass. This, in combination with their terrestrial habits and behavioral flightlessness, is a significant contributor to the rail's remarkably fast loss of flight; as few as 125,000 years were needed for the Laysan rail to lose the power of flight and evolve the reduced, stubby wings only useful to keep balance when running quickly. Indeed, some argue that measuring the evolution of flightlessness in rails in generations rather than millennia might be possible.

Another factor that contributes to the occurrence of the flightless state is a climate that does not necessitate seasonal long-distance migration; this is evidenced by the tendency to evolve flightlessness at a much greater occurrence in tropical islands than in temperate or polar islands.

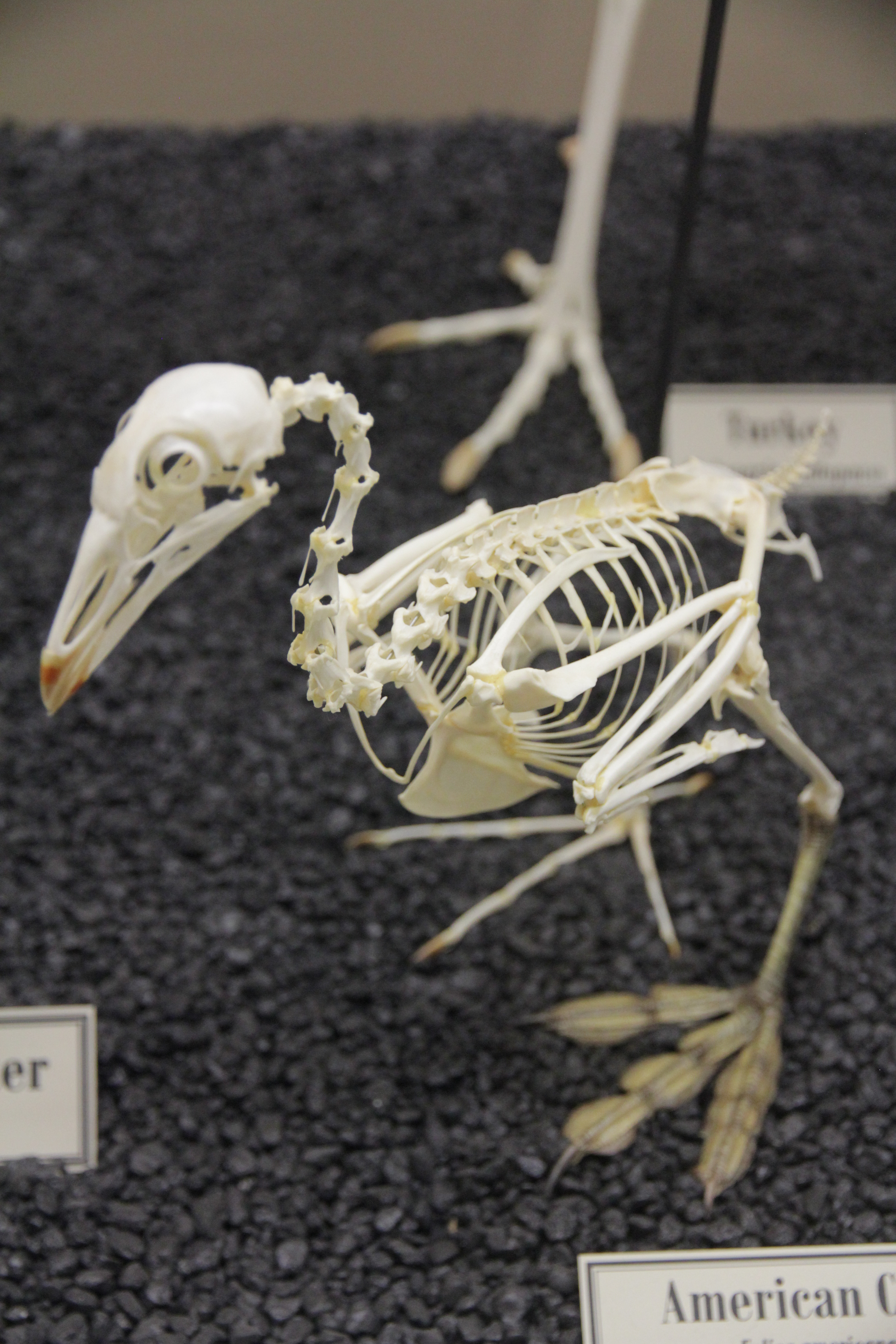
American coot (Fulica americana) skeleton on display at the Museum of Osteology.

It is paradoxical, since rails appear loath to fly, that the evolution of flightless rails would necessitate high dispersal to isolated islands. Nonetheless, three species of small-massed rails, Gallirallus philippensis, Porphyrio porphyrio, and Porzana tabuensis, exhibit a persistently high ability to disperse long distances among tropic Pacific islands, though only the latter two gave rise to flightless endemic species throughout the Pacific Basin. In examining the phylogeny of G. philippensis, although the species is clearly polyphyletic (it has more than one ancestral species), it is not the ancestor of most of its flightless descendants, revealing that the flightless condition evolved in rails before speciation was complete.

A consequence of lowered energy expenditure in flightless island rails has also been associated with evolution of their "tolerance" and "approachability". For example, the (non-Rallidae) Corsican blue tits exhibit lower aggression and reduced territorial defense behaviors than do their mainland European counterparts, but this tolerance may be limited to close relatives. The resulting kin-selecting altruistic phenomena reallocate resources to produce fewer young that are more competitive and would benefit the population as an entirety, rather than many young that would exhibit less fitness. Unfortunately, with the human occupation of most islands in the past 5,000 to 35,000 years, selection has undoubtedly reversed the tolerance into a wariness of humans and predators, causing species unequipped for the change to become susceptible to extinction.

== Behaviour and ecology ==
In general, rails are shy, secretive, and difficult to observe. Most species walk and run vigorously on strong legs, and have long toes that are well adapted to soft, uneven surfaces.

The most typical family members occupy dense vegetation in damp environments near lakes, swamps, or rivers. Reed beds are a particularly favoured habitat. Those that migrate do so at night.

=== Diet and feeding ===
In general, members of the Rallidae are omnivorous generalists. Many species eat invertebrates, as well as fruit or seedlings. A few species are primarily herbivorous.

=== Calls ===
The calls of Rallidae species vary and are often quite loud. Some are whistle-like or squeak-like, while others seem unbirdlike. Loud calls are useful in dense vegetation, or at night where seeing another member of the species is difficult. Some calls are territorial.

=== Reproduction ===
The breeding behaviors of many Rallidae species are poorly understood or unknown. Most nest in dense vegetation, and are thought to be monogamous, although polygyny and polyandry have been reported. Most often, they lay five to 10 eggs. Clutches as small as one or as large as 15 eggs are known. Egg clutches may not always hatch at the same time. Chicks become mobile after a few days. They often depend on their parents until fledging, which happens around 1 month old.

== Rallidae and humans ==
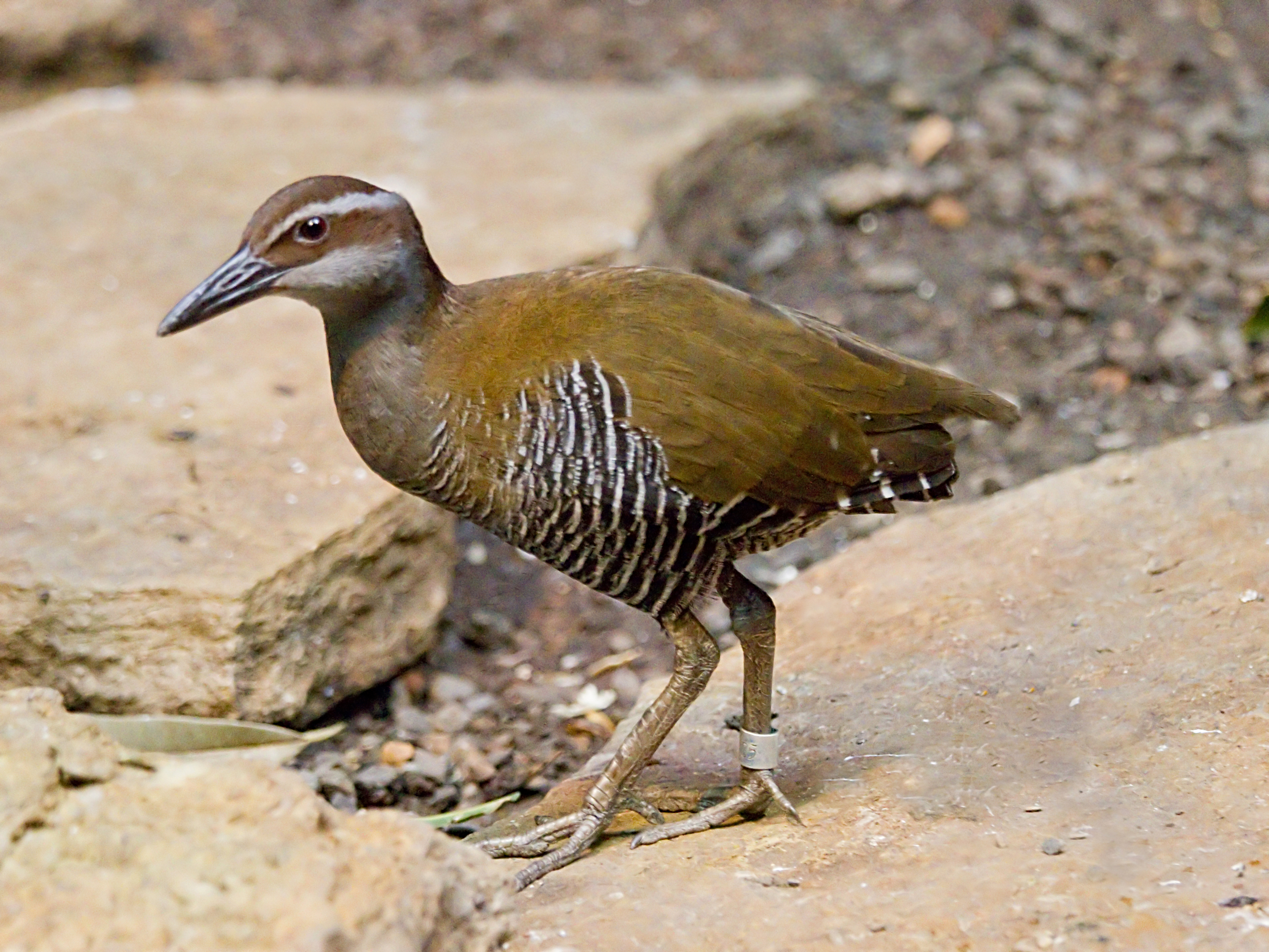
The Guam rail is an example of an island species that has been badly affected by introduced species.

Some larger, more abundant rails are hunted and their eggs collected for food. The Wake Island rail was hunted to extinction by the starving Japanese garrison after the island was cut off from supply during World War II. At least two species, the common moorhen and the American purple gallinule, have been considered pests.

=== Threats and conservation ===
Due to their tendencies towards flightlessness, many island species have been unable to cope with introduced species. The most dramatic human-caused extinctions occurred in the Pacific Ocean as people colonised the islands of Melanesia, Polynesia, and Micronesia, during which an estimated 750–1800 species of birds became extinct, half of which were rails. Some species that came close to extinction, such as the Lord Howe woodhen, and the takahē, have made modest recoveries due to the efforts of conservation organisations. The Guam rail came perilously close to extinction when brown tree snakes were introduced to Guam, but some of the last remaining individuals were taken into captivity and are breeding well, though attempts at reintroduction have met with mixed results.

== Systematics and evolution ==
The family Rallidae was introduced (as Rallia) by the French polymath Constantine Samuel Rafinesque in 1815. The family has traditionally been grouped with two families of larger birds, the cranes and bustards, as well as several smaller families of usually "primitive" midsized amphibious birds, to make up the order Gruiformes. The alternative Sibley-Ahlquist taxonomy, which has been widely accepted in America, raises the family to ordinal level as the Ralliformes. Given uncertainty about gruiform monophyly, this may or may not be correct. However, such a group would probably also include the Heliornithidae (finfoots and sungrebes), an exclusively tropical group that is somewhat convergent with grebes, and usually united with the rails in the Ralli.

The cladogram below showing the phylogeny of the living and recently extinct Rallidae is mostly based on a study by Juan Garcia-R and collaborators published in 2020. The position of the chestnut-headed crake (Anurolimnas castaneiceps) and the arrangement in the tribe Laterallini is based on the study by Emiliano Depino and collaborators that was published in 2023. The genera and number of species are taken from the taxonomy published by Avilist. The names of the subfamilies and tribes are those proposed by Jeremy Kirchman and collaborators in 2021.

- Rallidae
  - Rallinae
    - Pardirallini
      - Anurolimnas – chestnut-headed crake
      - - - Mustelirallus – crakes (4 species)
          - Pardirallus – rails (3 species)
        - - Amaurolimnas – uniform crake
          - Aramides – rails (8 species)
    - Rallini
      - Rallus – rails (14 species)
      - - - Crecopsis – African crake
          - Rougetius – Rouget's rail
        - - - Dryolimnas – rails (3 species, of which 2 are extinct)
            - - Crex – corn crake
              - Lewinia – rails (4 species)
          - Gallirallus rails (18 species, of which 6 are extinct)
  - Himantornithinae
    - - Himantornithini
        Himantornis – Nkulengu rail
      - Fulicini
        - Porzana – crakes and sora (3 species)
        - - Tribonyx – nativehens (2 species)
          - - Paragallinula – lesser moorhen
            - - Gallinula – moorhens (7 species, of which 2 are extinct)
              - Fulica – coots (11 species, of which 1 is extinct)
    - - Porphyrionini
        Porphyrio – swamphens, gallinules and takahē (8 species, of which 3 are extinct)
      - - Laterallini
          - Rufirallus – crakes (5 species)
          - - Coturnicops – rails (2 species)
            - Laterallus – crakes and rails (11 species)
        - - Zapornini
            - Zapornia – rails and crakes (15 species, of which 5 are extinct)
            - Rallina – crakes (4 species)
          - Amaurornithini
            - - Megacrex – New Guinea flightless rail
              - Poliolimnas – white-browed crake
            - - Aenigmatolimnas – striped crake
              - - Gallicrex – watercock
                - Amaurornis – waterhen and bush-hens (5 species)

=== Extant genera ===
The list maintained by the AviList team contains 148 species divided into 38 genera. For more detail, see List of rail species.

- Canirallus – grey-throated rail
- Anurolimnas – chestnut-headed crake
- Mustelirallus – (4 species)
- Pardirallus (3 species)
- Amaurolimnas – uniform crake
- Aramides – wood rails (8 species)
- Rallus – typical rails (14 species)
- Crecopsis – African crake
- Rougetius – Rouget's rail
- Dryolimnas – (1 living species, 1 recently extinct)
- Crex – corn crake
- Aramidopsis – snoring rail
- Lewinia – (4 species)
- Gallirallus – (18 species, 6 recently extinct. Includes Aptenorallus, Habroptila, Eulabeornis, Cabalus and Hypotaenidia)
- Porphyriops – spot-flanked gallinule
- Porzana – (3 species)
- Tribonyx – nativehens (2 species)
- Paragallinula – lesser moorhen
- Gallinula – moorhens (5 living species, 2 recently extinct)
- Fulica – coots (10 living species, one recently extinct)
- Porphyrio – swamphens and purple gallinules (8 living species, 3 recently extinct)
- Rufirallus – (5 species)
- Coturnicops – (2 species)
- Laterallus – (11 species)
- Zapornia – (10 living species, 5 recently extinct)
- Rallina – (4 species)
- Gymnocrex – (3 species)
- Himantornis – Nkulengu rail
- Megacrex – New Guinea flightless rail
- Poliolimnas – white-browed crake
- Aenigmatolimnas – striped crake
- Gallicrex – watercock
- Amaurornis – bush-hens (5 species)

Additionally, many prehistoric rails of extant genera are known only from fossil or subfossil remains, such as the Ibiza rail (Rallus eivissensis). These have not been listed here; see the genus accounts and the articles on fossil and Late Quaternary prehistoric birds for these species.

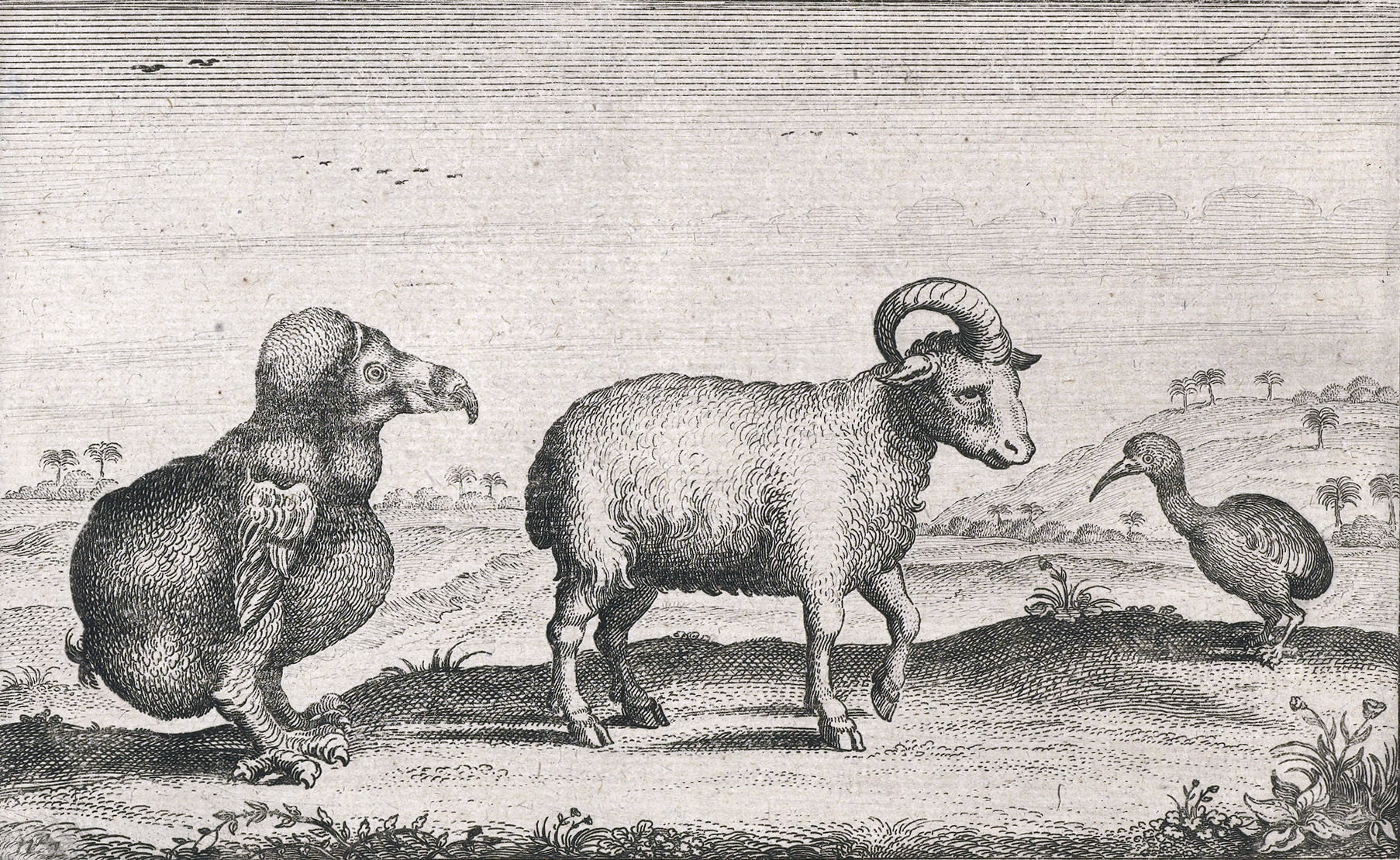
Pieter van den Broecke's 1617 drawing of the red rail of Mauritius, Aphanapteryx bonasia

=== Recently extinct genera ===
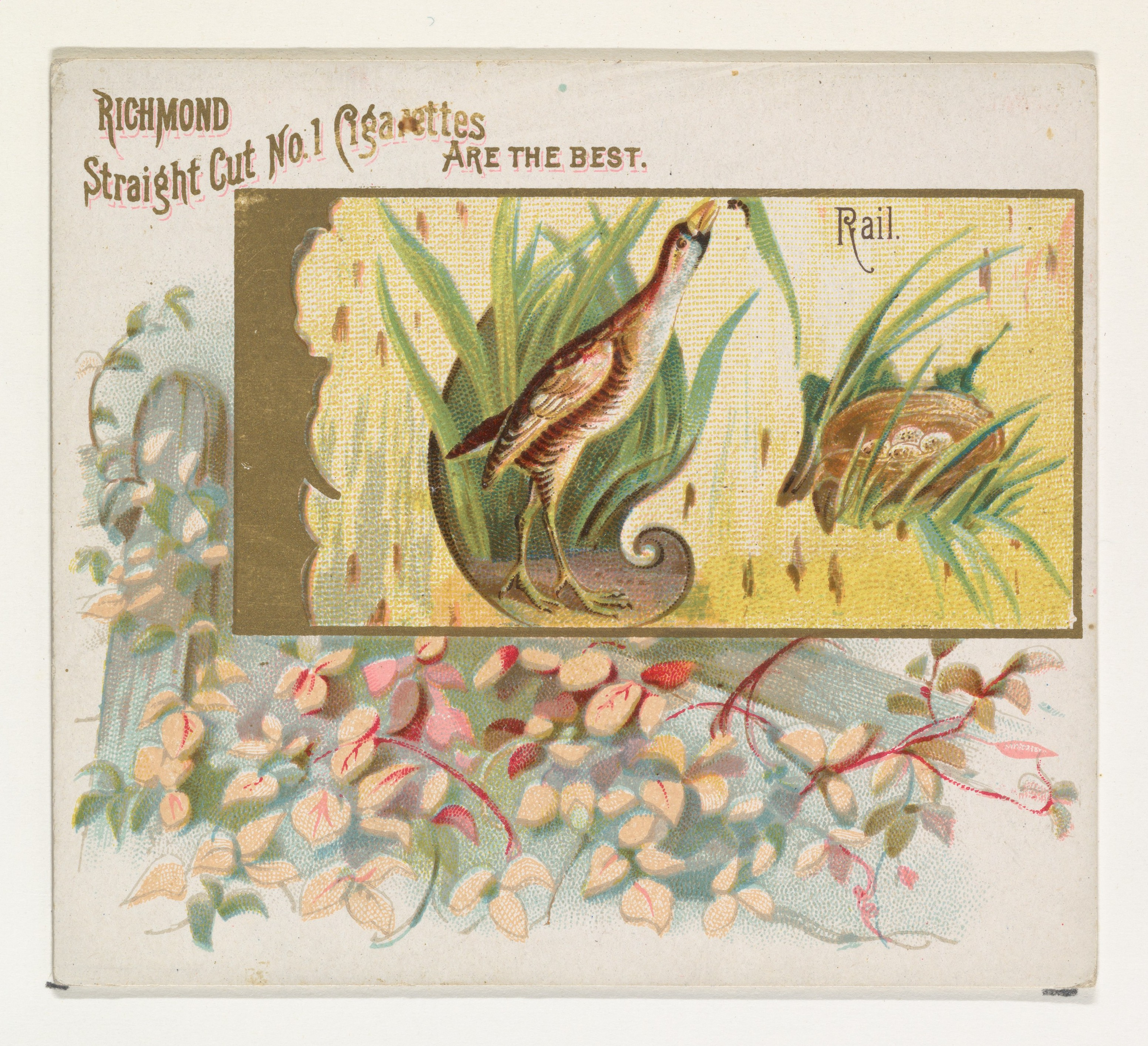
1888 color lithograph of a rail

- Mundia – Ascension crake (recently extinct; flightless, single island, lost by early 1800s to introduced cats and rats)
- Aphanocrex – Saint Helena rail (recently extinct; flightless, single island, lost by 1500s to introduced cats and rats)
- Diaphorapteryx – Hawkins's rail (recently extinct; flightless, two islands, lost between 1500 and 1700 to overhunting)
- Aphanapteryx – Red rail (recently extinct; flightless, single island, lost by 1700 to overhunting and introduced pigs, cats and rats)
- Erythromachus – Rodrigues rail (recently extinct; flightless, single island, lost by 1760 to overhunting, destruction of habitat by tortoise hunters, and introduced cats)
- Genus Cabalus – Chatham Islands rail and New Caledonian rail (sometimes included in Gallirallus; extinct around 1900)
- Genus Capellirallus – Snipe-rail (recently extinct; flightless, single island, lost by no later than the 1400s to introduced rats)
- Genus Vitirallus – Viti Levu rail (recently extinct; flightless, single island, lost by no later than the early Holocene)
- Genus Hovacrex – Hova gallinule (recently extinct; flight ability uncertain, single island, lost by no later than the Late Pleistocene)

The undescribed Fernando de Noronha rail, genus and species undetermined, survived to historic times. The extinct genus Nesotrochis from the Greater Antilles was formerly considered to be a rail, but based on DNA evidence is now known to be an independent lineage of gruiform more closely related to Sarothruridae and the adzebills.

=== Fossil record ===
Fossil species of long-extinct prehistoric rails are richly documented from the well-researched formations of Europe and North America, as well from the less comprehensively studied strata elsewhere:

- Genus Eocrex (Wasatch Early Eocene of Steamboat Springs, USA; Late Eocene – ?Oligocene of Isfara, Tadzhikistan)
- Genus Palaeorallus (Wasatch Early Eocene of Wyoming, USA)
- Genus Parvirallus (Early – Middle Eocene of England)
- Genus Aletornis (Bridger Middle Eocene of Uinta County, USA) – includes Protogrus
- Genus Fulicaletornis (Bridger Middle Eocene of Henry's Fork, USA)
- Genus Latipons (Middle Eocene of Lee-on-Solent, England)
- Genus Ibidopsis (Hordwell Late Eocene of Hordwell, UK)
- Genus Quercyrallus (Late Eocene -? Late Oligocene of France)
- Genus Belgirallus (Early Oligocene of WC Europe)
- Genus Rallicrex (Corbula Middle/Late Oligocene of Kolzsvár, Romania)
- Rallidae gen. et sp. indet. (Late Oligocene of Billy-Créchy, France)
- Genus Palaeoaramides (Late Oligocene/Early Miocene – Late Miocene of France)
- Genus Rhenanorallus (Late Oligocene/Early Miocene of Mainz Basin, Germany)
- Genus Paraortygometra (Late Oligocene/?Early Miocene -? Middle Miocene of France) – includes Microrallus
- Genus Australlus (Late Oligocene – Middle Miocene of NW Queensland, Australia)
- Genus Pararallus (Late Oligocene? – Late Miocene of C Europe) – possibly belongs in Palaeoaramides
- Genus Litorallus (Early Miocene of New Zealand)
- Rallidae gen. et sp. indet. (Bathans Early/Middle Miocene of Otago, New Zealand)
- Rallidae gen. et sp. indet. (Bathans Early/Middle Miocene of Otago, New Zealand)
- Genus Miofulica (Anversian Black Sand Middle Miocene of Antwerp, Belgium)
- Genus Miorallus (Middle Miocene of Sansan, France -? Late Miocene of Rudabánya, Hungary)
- Genus Youngornis (Shanwang Middle Miocene of Linqu, China)
- Rallidae gen. et sp. indet. (Sajóvölgyi Middle Miocene of Mátraszõlõs, Hungary)
- Rallidae gen. et sp. indet. (Middle Miocene of Grive-Saint-Alban, France)
- Rallidae gen. et sp. indet. (Late Miocene of Lemoyne Quarry, USA)
- Rallidae gen. et sp. indet. UMMP V55013-55014; UMMP V55012/V45750/V45746 (Rexroad Late Pliocene of Saw Rock Canyon, USA)
- Rallidae gen. et sp. indet. UMMP V29080 (Rexroad Late Pliocene of Fox Canyon, USA)
- Genus Creccoides (Blanco Late Pliocene/Early Pleistocene of Crosby County, USA)
- Rallidae gen. et sp. indet. (Bermuda, West Atlantic)
- Rallidae gen. et sp. indet. (formerly Fulica podagrica) (Late Pleistocene of Barbados)
- Genus Pleistorallus (mid-Pleistocene New Zealand). The holotype of Pleistorallus flemingi is in the collection of the Museum of New Zealand Te Papa Tongarewa.

=== Doubtfully placed here ===
These taxa may or may not have been rails:

- Genus Ludiortyx (Late Eocene) – includes "Tringa" hoffmanni, "Palaeortyx" blanchardi, "P." hoffmanni
- Genus Telecrex (Irdin Manha Late Eocene of Chimney Butte, China)
- Genus Amitabha (Bridger middle Eocene of Forbidden City, USA) – phasianid?
- Genus Palaeocrex (Early Oligocene of Trigonias Quarry, USA)
- Genus Rupelrallus (Early Oligocene of Germany)
- Neornithes incerta sedis (Late Oligocene of Riversleigh, Australia)
- Genus Euryonotus (Pleistocene of Argentina)

The presumed scolopacid wader Limosa gypsorum (Montmartre Late Eocene of France) is sometimes considered a rail and then placed in the genus Montirallus.

== See also ==
- List of Gruiformes by population
