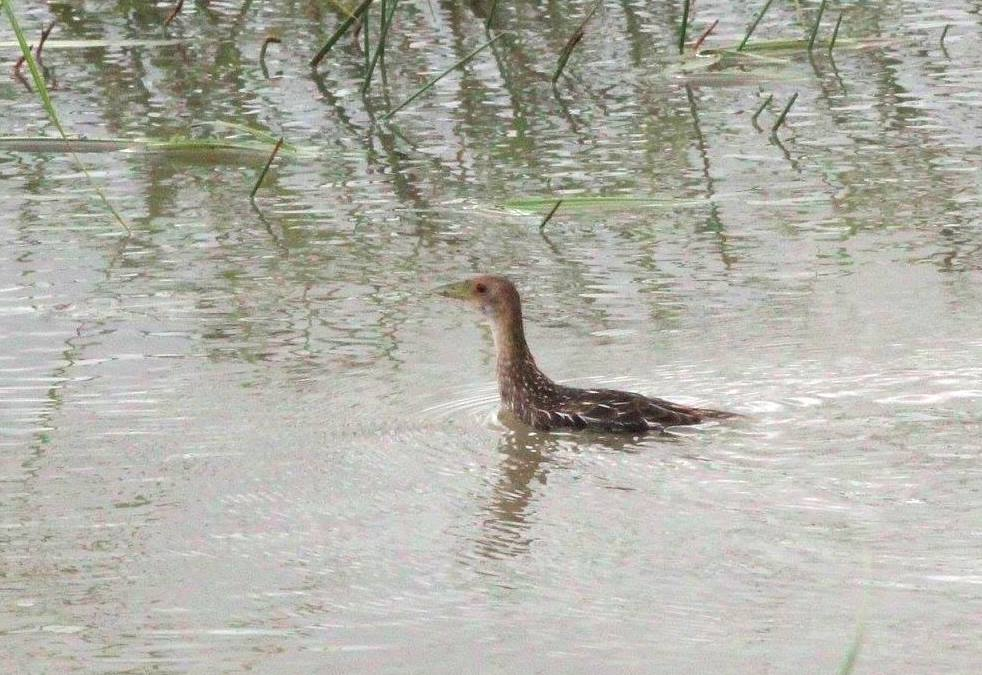
- male

Conservation status
- Least Concern (IUCN 3.1)

Scientific classification
- Kingdom: Animalia
- Phylum: Chordata
- Class: Aves
- Order: Gruiformes
- Family: Rallidae
- Genus: Aenigmatolimnas; J.L. Peters, 1932
- Species: A. marginalis

Binomial name
- Aenigmatolimnas marginalis (Hartlaub, 1857)

Synonyms
- Porzana marginalis Amaurornis marginalis Poliolimnas marginalis (Hartlaub, 1857)

= Striped crake =

Species of bird

The striped crake (Aenigmatolimnas marginalis) is a species of bird in the family Rallidae. It is the only species in the genus Aenigmatolimnas, having formerly been included in Porzana or in Poliolimnas. Its precise relationships, however, are still enigmatic.

== Range ==
It is found in Cameroon, Comoros, Republic of the Congo, DRC, Ivory Coast, Gabon, Ghana, Kenya, Malawi, Namibia, Nigeria, Rwanda, Seychelles, South Africa, Tanzania, Uganda, Zambia, and Zimbabwe.

Vagrants have been recorded in Kuwait, Italy, Algeria, Morocco and Libya.

== Gallery ==
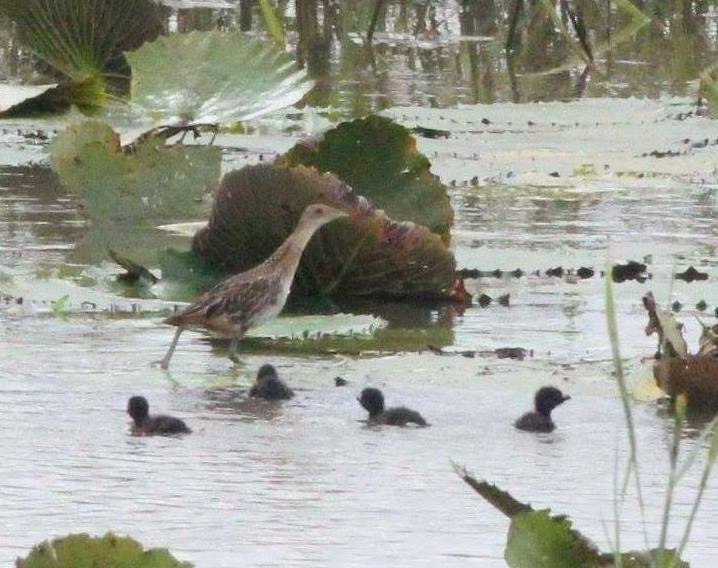
male and chicks

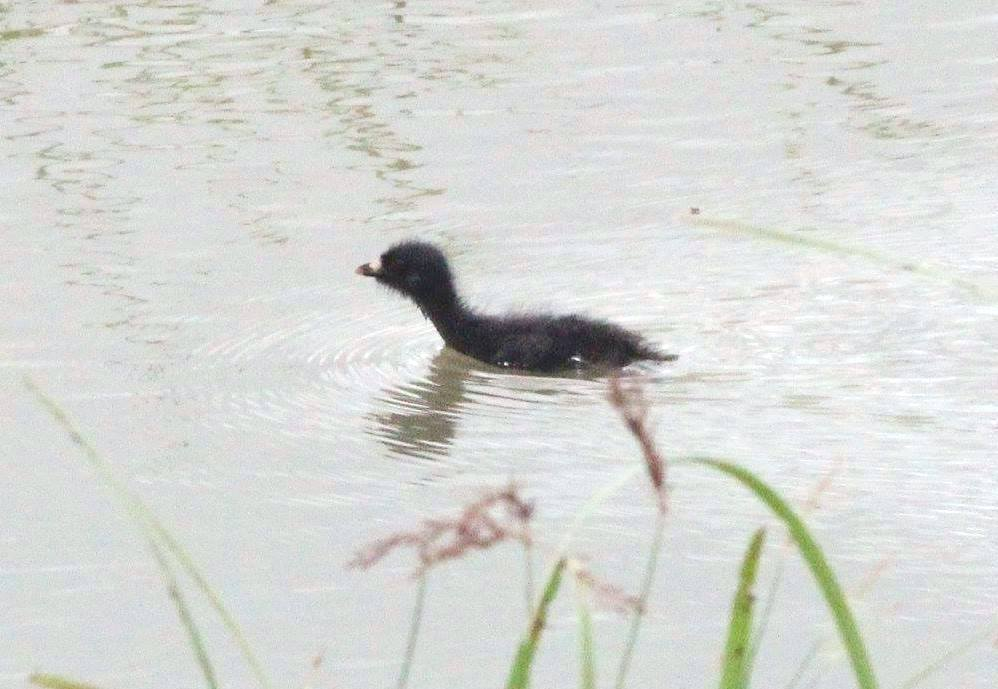
chick
