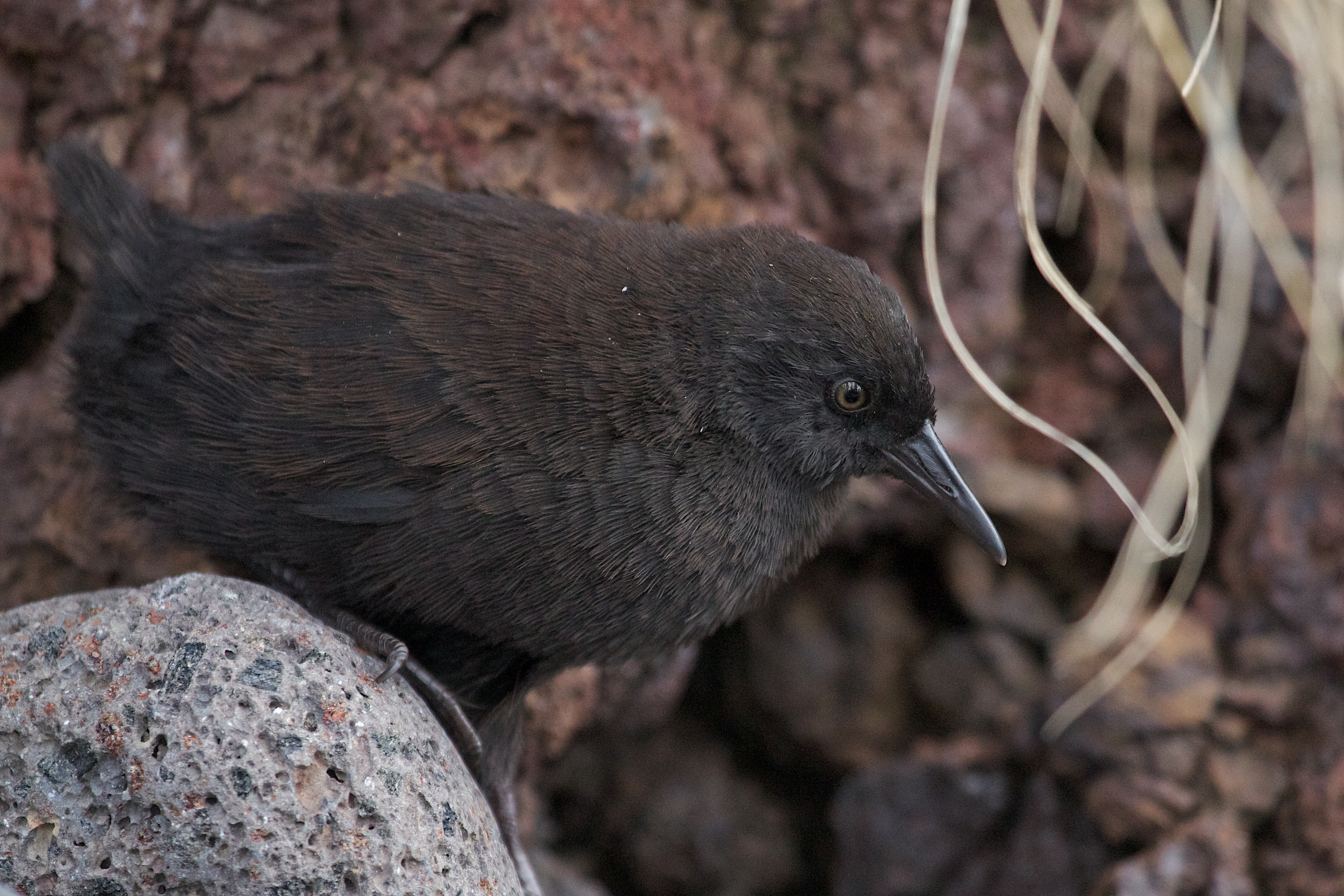

Conservation status
- Vulnerable (IUCN 3.1)

Scientific classification
- Kingdom: Animalia
- Phylum: Chordata
- Class: Aves
- Order: Gruiformes
- Family: Rallidae
- Genus: Laterallus
- Species: L. rogersi

Binomial name
- Laterallus rogersi (Lowe, 1923)
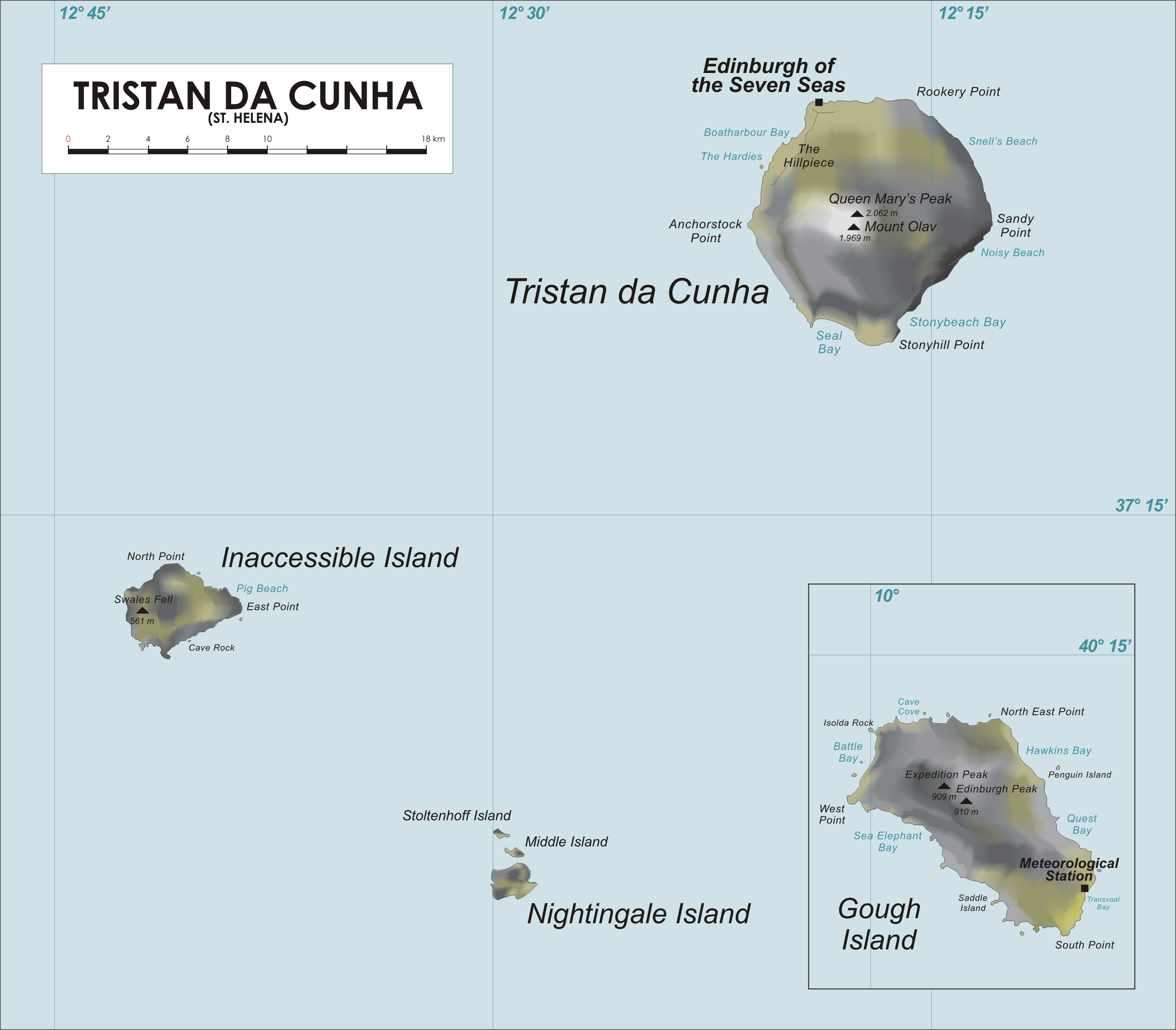
- Inaccessible Island in the Tristan Archipelago

Synonyms
- Atlantisia rogersi Lowe, 1923

= Inaccessible Island rail =

Bird species endemic to the south Atlantic

The Inaccessible Island rail, or Inaccessible rail (Laterallus rogersi), is a small bird species of the rail family, Rallidae. Endemic to Inaccessible Island in the Tristan Archipelago in the isolated south Atlantic, it is the smallest extant flightless bird in the world. The species was formally described by physician Percy Lowe in 1923 but had first come to the attention of scientists 50 years earlier. The Inaccessible Island rail's taxonomic affinities and origin were a long-standing mystery; in 2018 its closest relative was identified as the South American dot-winged crake, and it was decided that both species are best classified in the genus Laterallus.

The Inaccessible Island rail has brown plumage, black bill and feet, and adults have a red eye. It occupies most habitats on Inaccessible Island, from the beaches to the central plateau, feeding on a variety of small invertebrates and also some plant matter. Pairs are territorial and monogamous, with both parents being responsible for incubating the eggs and raising the chicks. Its adaptations to living on a tiny island at high densities include low base metabolic rates, small clutch sizes, and flightlessness.

Unlike many other oceanic islands, Inaccessible Island has remained free from introduced predators, allowing this species to flourish while many other flightless birds, particularly flightless rails, have gone extinct. The species is nevertheless considered vulnerable by the International Union for Conservation of Nature (IUCN), due to its single small population, which would be threatened by the accidental introduction of mammalian predators such as rats or cats.

== Discovery ==
Although the Inaccessible Island rail may have been known to the Tristan Islanders who visited the island annually to hunt seals, the species first came to the attention of scientists during the Challenger expedition of 1872–1876. When the expedition visited the island in October 1873, Sir Charles Wyville Thomson learned of the species and recorded observations made by two German brothers, the Stoltenhoffs, who had been living on the island for the last two years. Thomson was unable to collect a specimen.

Another attempt was made to collect a specimen by Lord Crawford on his yacht Valhalla in 1905. A final attempt was made during the Shackleton–Rowett Expedition, which passed by in April 1922 on its way back to Britain. This visit also failed, but members of the expedition left collecting material with a Rev. H. M. C. Rogers, then chaplain on Tristan da Cunha. The following year two study skins arrived in the Natural History Museum, London, followed soon after by another skin and a specimen in spirits. Physician Percy Lowe was then able to use the skins to describe the species. He did so, briefly, at a meeting of the British Ornithologists' Club, in 1923.

== Evolution and taxonomy ==
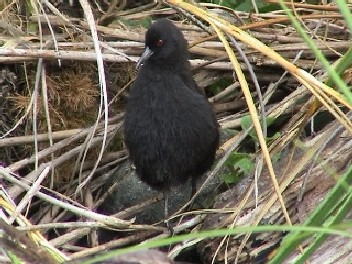
Inaccessible Island rail

Prior to its collection it had been assumed by Thomson that the species was close to the other "island hens" known in the Atlantic, possibly a gallinule, but on examination Lowe felt "compelled to refer it to a new genus". The generic name Atlantisia was named for the mythical island of Atlantis, destroyed by a volcano. The specific name rogersi honours the Rev. Rogers, who collected and sent the first specimens of the species to Lowe.

In his 1928 paper on the species, Lowe thought the Inaccessible Island rail was the descendant of flightless ancestors which had reached Inaccessible Island via a land bridge or sunken continent such as Lemuria. Land bridges were commonly invoked to explain biogeographical distribution patterns before the development and acceptance of plate tectonics. By 1955 it was understood that the rail was the descendant of ancestors that had flown to Inaccessible Island. It was also presumed that, like most other land birds of the Tristan Archipelago (except the Tristan moorhen Gallinula nesiotis and the Gough moorhen G. comeri), it had probably reached the island from ancestors in South America.

The position of the Inaccessible Island rail in the larger rail family (Rallidae) has long been a source of uncertainty. Lowe thought that its closest relatives may have been black crake of Africa, or perhaps an early offshoot of the genus Porphyrio (swamphens), a conclusion based mostly on similarities of plumage. He did concede that it was difficult to assign the rail to any relatives. American paleontologist Storrs Olson suggested in 1973 that it was related to the "Rallus assemblage", which included the genera Rallus and Hypotaenidia (now lumped with Gallirallus), based on the structure of the skeleton. In particular he suggested it was part of a pro-Rallus group that included the Indian Ocean genus Dryolimnas, and the Australasian Lewinia. Olson suggested the pro-Rallus rails have a relict distribution and would have been present in Africa and South America, where the ancestors of the Inaccessible Island rail came from. The most recent comparative morphological study to include the genus, in 1998, placed it in a subtribe Crecina of the crakes. Its exact position could not be determined, but it was suggested to perhaps be the sister taxon to the genus Laterallus, a genus of small crakes found mostly in South America.

Two extinct flightless species of rail were at one time placed in the genus Atlantisia with the Inaccessible Island rail. The Ascension crake (Mundia elpenor) and the Saint Helena swamphen (Aphanocrex podarces) were once considered congeners of A. rogersi. The Ascension crake disappeared some time before 1700 but was briefly mentioned and described by traveller and hobby naturalist Peter Mundy in 1656. The Saint Helena swamphen disappeared before 1600 and has never been encountered alive by scientists. In 1973 Olson synonymised the genus Aphanocrex with the genus Atlantisia, and described the Ascension crake as being congeneric. Today they are considered to have evolved independently (with A. podarces probably not even being closely related), and in 2003 the genus Mundia was erected and the Saint Helena swamphen moved back to Aphanocrex, leaving the Inaccessible Island rail the only species in the genus Atlantisia. Both the Ascension crake and the Saint Helena swamphen became extinct due to predation by introduced species, mainly cats and rats.

Stervander et al. (2019) resolved the taxonomic affinity and evolutionary history of the Inaccessible Island rail by phylogenetic analyses of the DNA sequence of its full mitochondrial genome and a handful mitochondrial and nuclear genetic markers. According to this study, the Inaccessible Island rail belongs to a clade comprising its sister species, the dot-winged crake, the black rail (Laterallus jamaicensis) in America, and most likely the Galápagos crake (Laterallus spilonota), therefore suggested referring the Inaccessible Island rail to the genus Laterallus. It colonized Inaccessible Island from South America c. 1.5 million years ago.

== Morphology ==
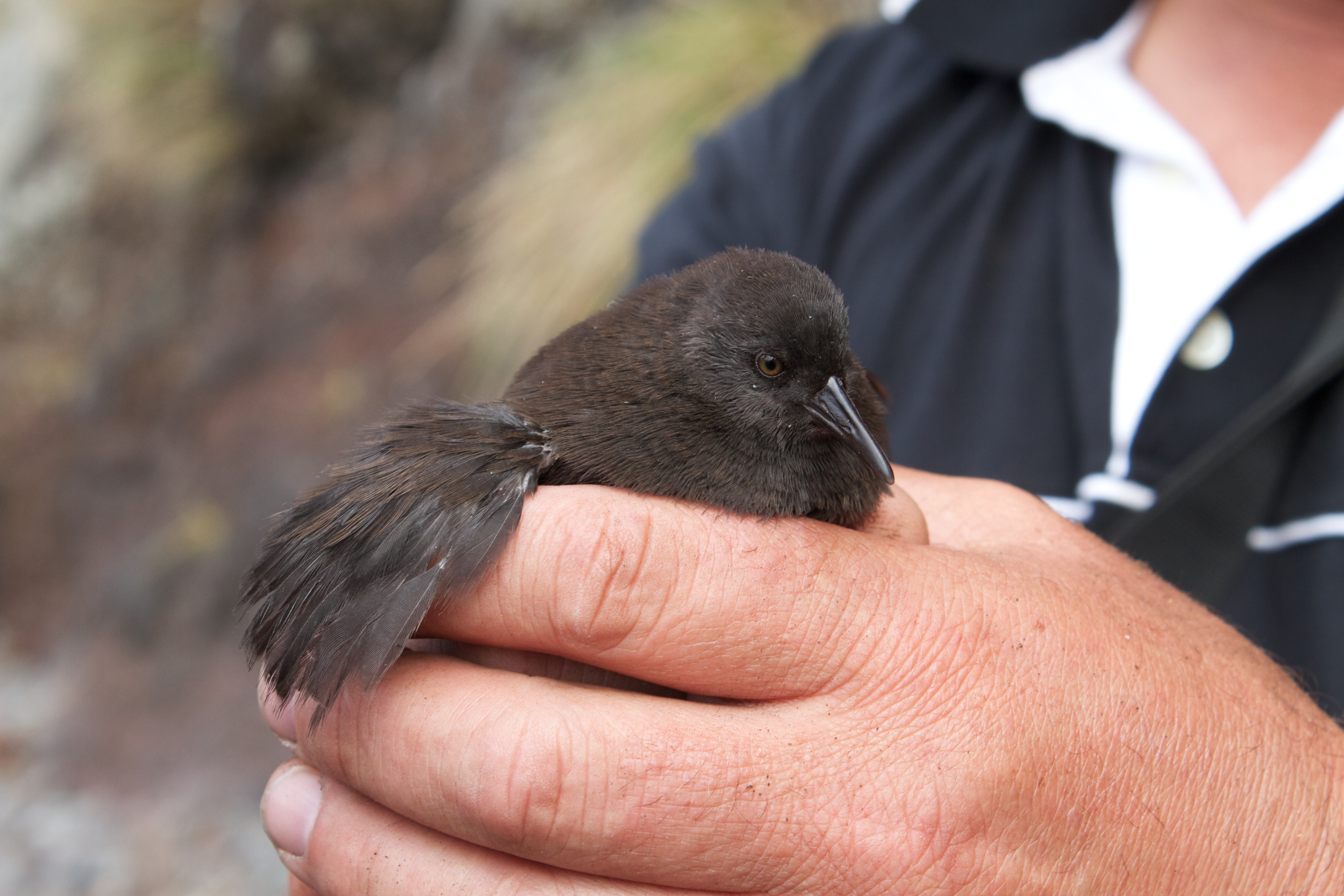
Inaccessible Island rail, showing the small flightless wings

The Inaccessible Island rail is the smallest living flightless bird in the world, measuring 13 to 15.5 cm (5.1–6.1 in). Males are larger and heavier than females, weighing 35–49 g (1.2–1.7 oz), average 40.5 g (1.43 oz), compared to 34–42 g (1.2–1.5 oz), average 37 g (1.3 oz), in females. It is dark chestnut-brown above and dark grey on the head and below, with degraded white barring on the flanks and belly, and adults have red eyes. The female is similar to the male but with paler grey and a faint brown wash on the underparts. It has a black bill, which is shorter than the head. The feathers of the Inaccessible Island rail are almost hair-like, and in particular the flight feathers are degenerate, as the barbules on many of the feathers (but not all, as has sometimes been reported) fail to interlock, giving the feathers a ragged appearance. The wings are reduced and weak, and smaller than same-sized flying relatives, as is the sternum. The tail is short, 3.5 cm (1.4 in) in length, and the uppertail coverts and undertail coverts are nearly as long as the tail rectrices.

The Inaccessible Island rail has a low basal metabolic rate (BMR), measured in 1989 at around 60–68% the rate expected for a bird of its weight. The scientists responsible for the study speculated that the low BMR was not as a result of flightlessness, which does not have this effect in other bird species, but was instead the result of the rail's island lifestyle. The island lacks predators and other competitors, and as such can be expected to be at full carrying capacity for rails. This in turn would favour energy conservation by the rails, resulting in small body size, low BMR and flightlessness. A comparison of flighted and flightless rails, including the Inaccessible Island rail, found that rails that lose the ability to fly also have low BMRs.

== Distribution and habitat ==
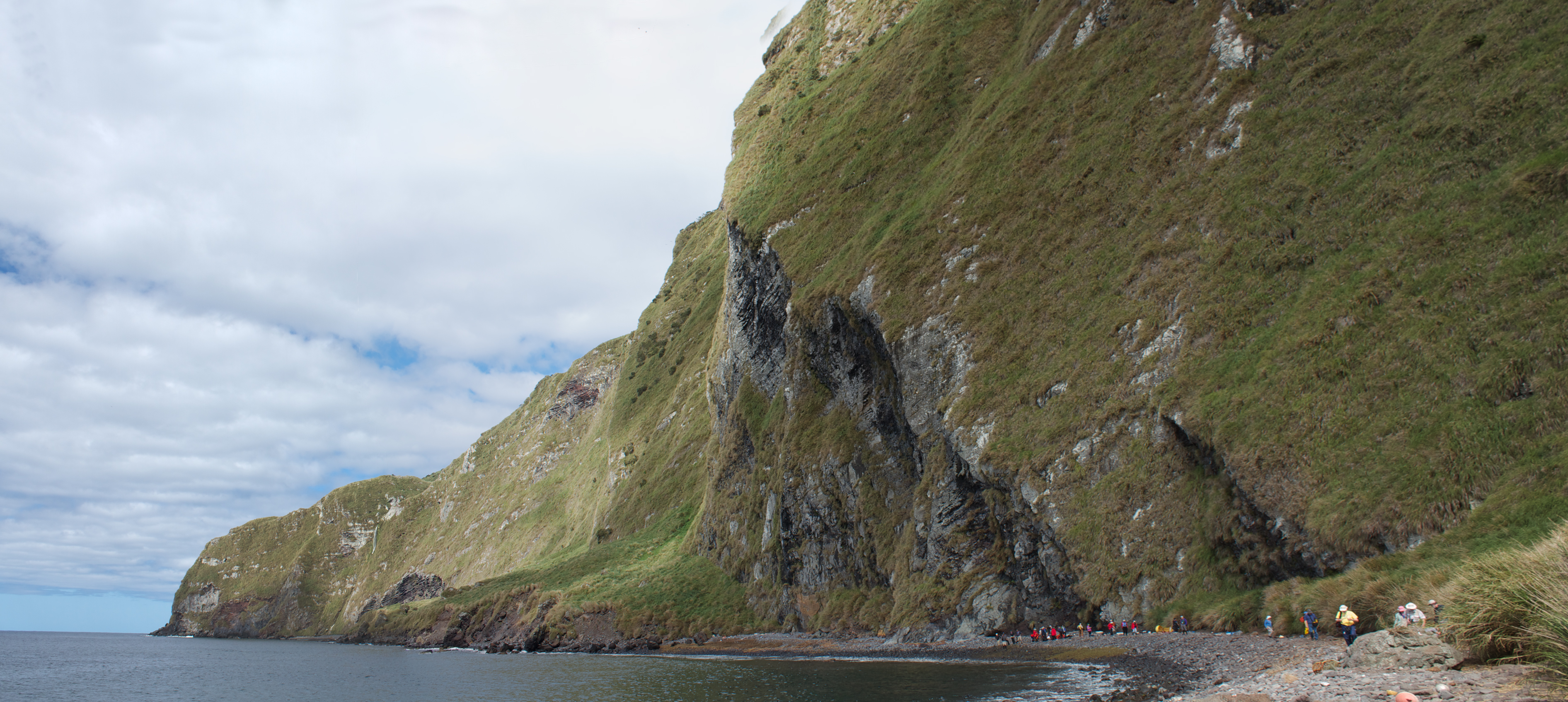
Tussock grass lowlands and steep cliffs from the shore of Inaccessible Island

The Inaccessible Island rail is endemic to the uninhabited Inaccessible Island in the Tristan da Cunha group in the mid-Atlantic Ocean. The island is 14 km^{2} (5.4 sq mi) in area and has a temperate wet oceanic climate with high rainfall, limited sunshine and persistent westerly winds. The rail is found in almost all habitats on the island and at all altitudes, from sea-level to 449 m (1,473 ft). It reaches its highest densities in fields of tussock grass (Spartina arundinacea), with 10 birds per hectare, and in tussock grass mixed with ferns (Blechnum penna-marina) and sedges, with 15 birds per hectare. This habitat is found close to the shore and surrounds most of the island on the steep cliffs. The Inaccessible Island rail can also be found in upland fern-bush heath, dominated by wind-stunted tree-ferns (Blechnum palmiforme) and in the island forest in the central plateau which is dominated by Island Cape myrtle (Phylica arborea)—which can reach 5 m (16 ft) where sheltered—and Blechnum palmiforme. In both these habitats the population is estimated to be two birds per hectare. It will also forage among boulders on the beaches, but has not been found in the short dry grasses on the cinder cones (the scientists making the observations cautioned that this does not mean that they never use the habitat). It frequently uses natural cavities among boulders or tunnels through grasses created by frequent use to move around while concealed.

== Behaviour ==
The Inaccessible Island rail is territorial, and the territories they defend are tiny. The territories in the tussock grass habitats around Blenden Hall, where the population densities are highest, extend to 100–400 m^{2} (1,100–4,300 sq ft). The small size of the territories makes encounters between families and individuals frequent, and confrontations and territorial calling are common. On meeting, confrontations start with loud trills or twittering, then birds may face off, standing very close to each other and displaying ritually with their heads lowered and their bills pointed towards the ground. They may circle, and continue displaying until one bird slowly retreats or a quick skirmish ensues and one bird is driven off.

=== Diet and feeding ===
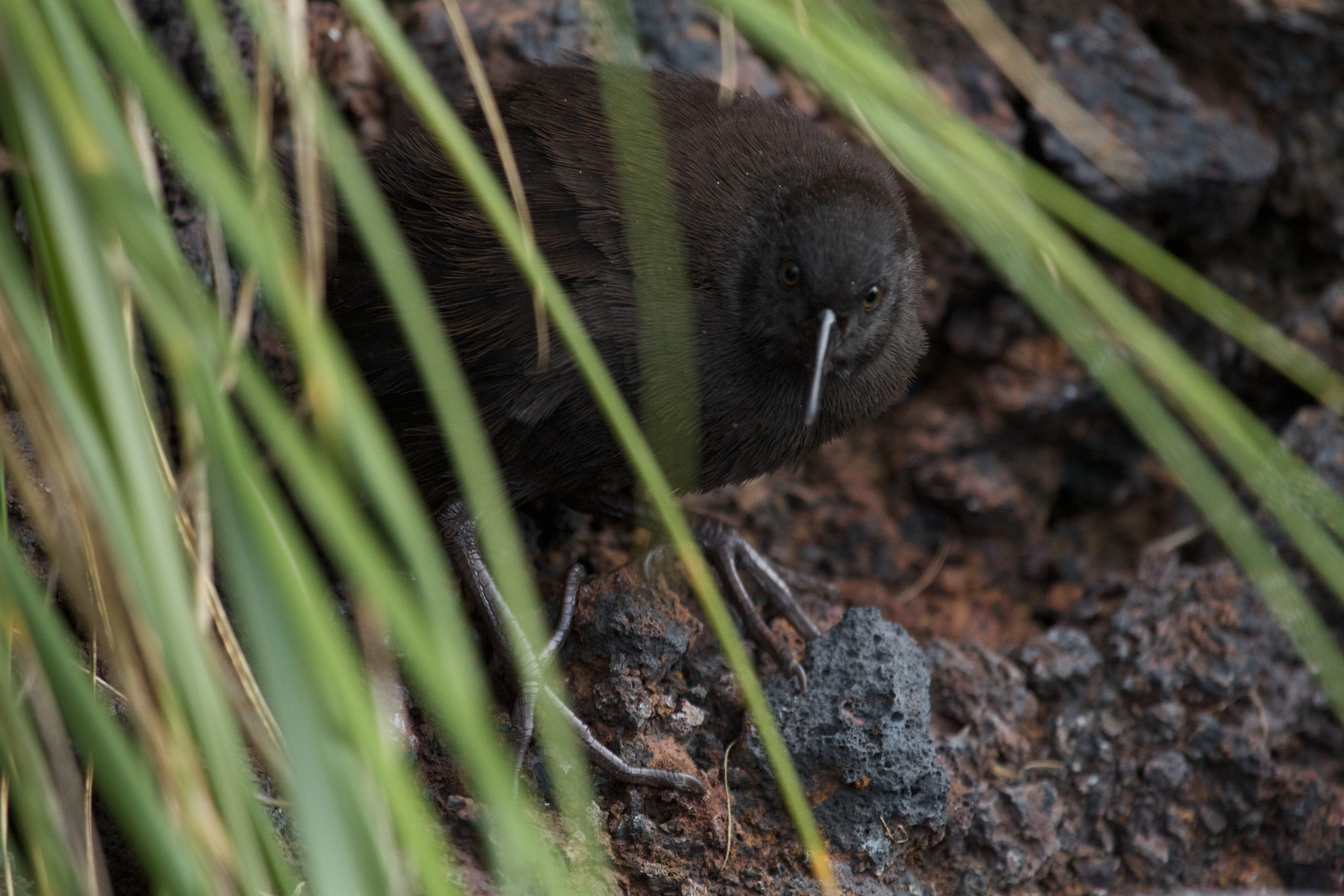
Inaccessible Island rails forage under tussock grass.

The foraging method used by the Inaccessible Island rail is slow and deliberate and has been compared to that of a mouse, and the bird occupies a similar ecological niche. They feed on a range of invertebrates, including earthworms, amphipods, isopods, mites and a range of insects such as beetles, flies, moths and caterpillars. Centipedes are taken as well, and an introduced species of centipede forms an important part of their diet. Along with animal prey they will take the berries of Empetrum and Nertera as well as the seeds of the dock Rumex. Unlike the Tristan thrush they do not feed on carrion or dead fish.

=== Calls ===
The Inaccessible Island rail is a highly vocal species, calling frequently. This may be because of the dense vegetation in which the species lives, making calls the best way to communicate, and pairs and families contact call frequently while feeding. Calls used include a long trill used when pairs meet and when confronting a rival. Rivals also make a long twitter "keekeekeekeekee" which can be long and short and end in a "keekeechitrrrr". After skirmishes between rivals the victorious bird may make a "weechup weechup" call. Birds may make a monotonous "tchik tchik tchok tchik" while hunting for prey, and the alarm call when predators are around is a short and hard "chip". They also make a variety of trilling calls while incubating, particularly when pairs swap places during incubation. Before changing places the incubating bird may make a "chip chip chip", but they fall silent when Tristan thrushes approach the nest.

=== Breeding ===
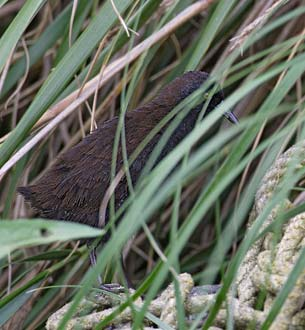
Inaccessible Island rails often nest in tussock grass.

The Inaccessible Island rail is a seasonal breeder, laying between October and January. They are monogamous, forming permanent pair-bonds. The nests are situated at the base of ferns with tussock grass, tussock grass clumps, or in tufts of sedges. The nests are domed and oval or pear shaped, with the entrances near the narrow end of the nest and linked by a track or tunnel that can go up to half a metre away. The nests are typically built entirely of the same material the nest is found in; for example, tussock grass or sedges. Where the construction material is tussock grass, larger leaves are used on the outside and finer material lines the nest. There are a few reports of other material being used as lining, such as the leaves of introduced Malus domestica (apple) or Salix babylonica (willow).

The clutch size is two eggs, which is low for such small rails. The eggs are greyish milk white dotted with brown-rufous spots and lavender-mauve spots that are concentrated around the apex of the egg. They are large for the size of the mother compared to other rails, and resemble the eggs of the corn crake.

The incubation period for the species is not known, but both sexes incubate the clutch, although the males incubated for longer in the observations that have been made. Both sexes bring food to their partner that is incubating, which is either consumed on the nest or close to the nest. Changeovers of incubation details are preceded by "chip chip chip" calls, which become louder and more frequent the longer its takes the partner to respond.

The eggs hatch within between 23 and 32 hours of each other and can be preceded by the chick in the egg calling for up to 45 hours before hatching. One hatching was recorded as taking 15 hours to complete. Newly hatched chicks are covered by downy black plumage, the legs, feet and bill are black, and the mouth is silvery.

== Ecology ==
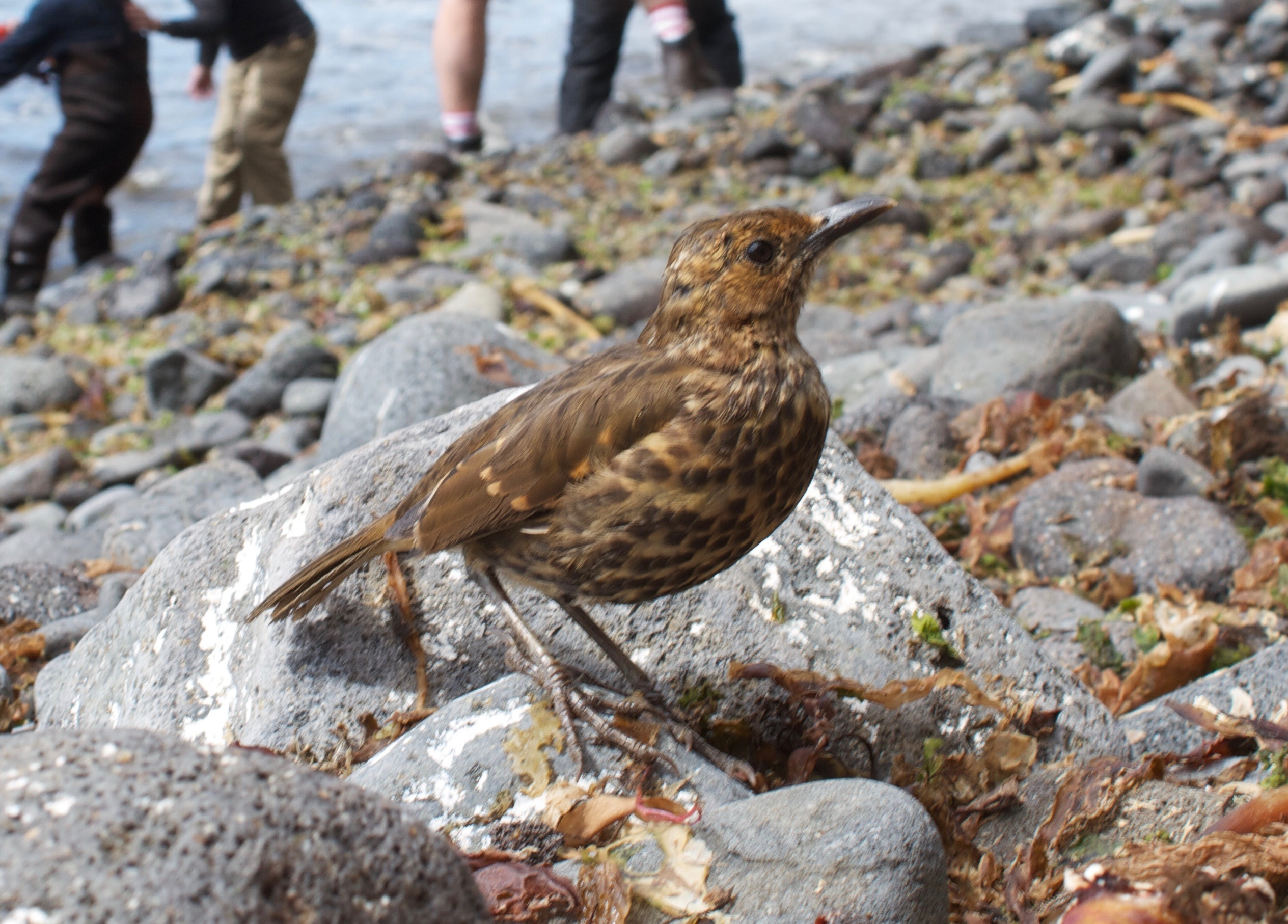
Tristan thrushes prey on rail chicks.

Lowe speculated in his 1927 paper that, in the absence of mammalian predators on the island, the brown skua would be the Inaccessible Island rail's only predator. A study of the diet of brown skuas on Inaccessible Island confirmed this, but found that although skuas do eat adults of this species, the rail and other landbirds formed only a small part of its diet, especially compared to their abundance on the island. They noted that the landbirds alarm-called when brown skuas were seen. After hearing another rail make an alarm call, adult rails become alert, while chicks fall silent. Adults are rarely preyed upon, but the mortality of chicks is high and predation by Tristan thrushes is a major cause of death.

Two species of chewing lice have been found on Inaccessible Island rails, Pscudomenopon scopulacorne and Rallicola (Parricola) zumpti. R. zumpti has not been described on any other species of bird from Inaccessible Island. P. scopulacorne found on the Inaccessible Island rail were originally described as a new species, P. rowani (Keler, 1951), but were later lumped into the widespread species in 1974.

== Threats and conservation ==
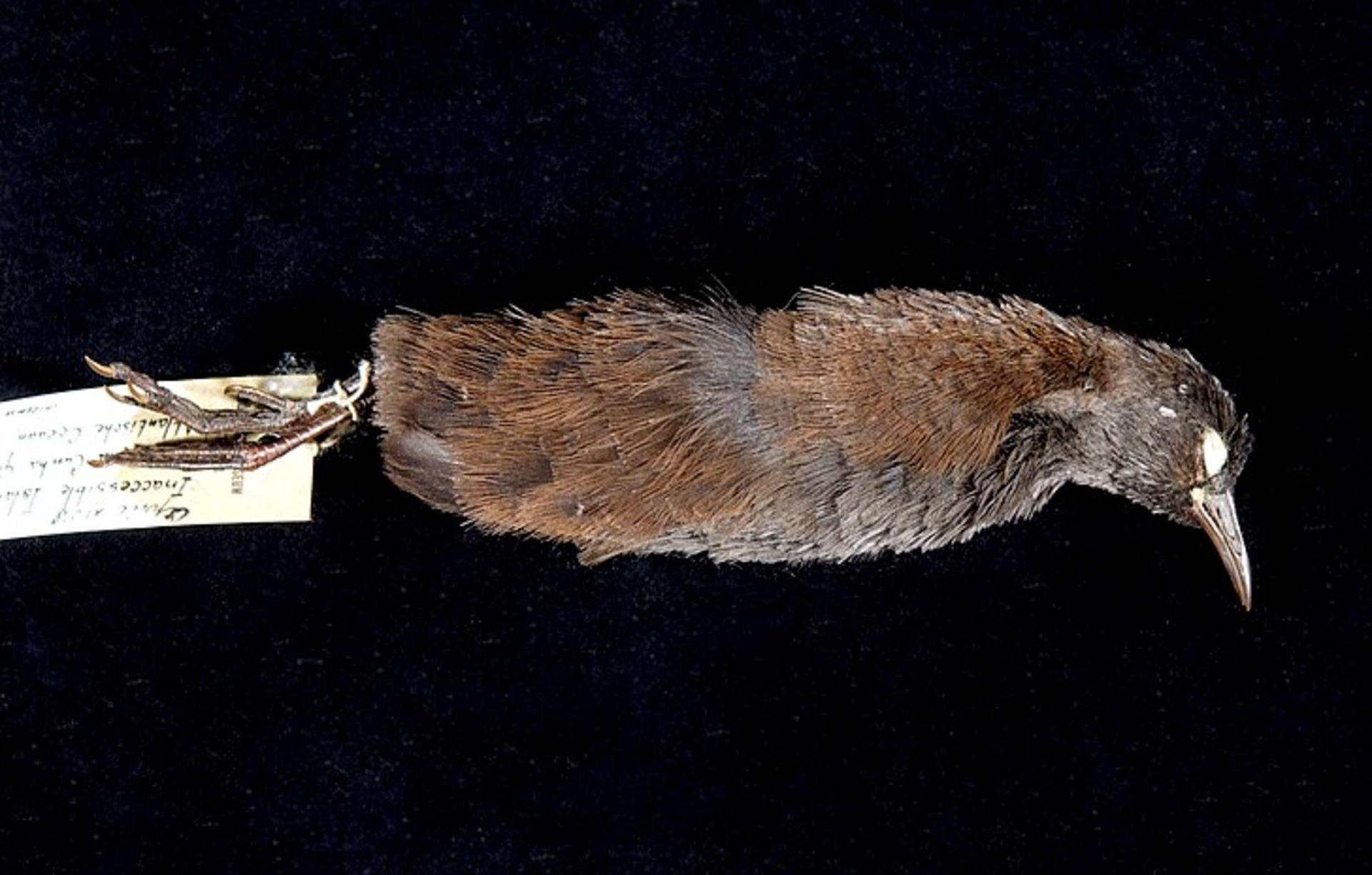
A study skin of the Inaccessible Island rail

The Inaccessible Island rail has a tiny global range with a single population. Though still common within its tiny range, with around 5,600 adult birds in the world, the species is considered to be vulnerable if an invasive species were to reach Inaccessible Island. Insular rails, particularly flightless species, are vulnerable to extinction. House mice, feral cats and brown rats, all of which would be a serious threat to this species, are not present on the island, nor have they ever been, but are present on nearby Tristan da Cunha, and could reach the islands via fishing vessels or other boats visiting the island (mice have been found on boats visiting the neighbouring Nightingale Island). Because of this vulnerability, this species is rated as vulnerable by the IUCN Red List. Fires of tussock grass, which were recorded in 1872 and 1909, are assumed to have killed large numbers of rails, but have not occurred since. In the 1950s, they were highly sought after for scientific collections, but permits to do so were rarely granted.

Several conservation measures have been undertaken or proposed to protect this species. Inaccessible Island was once suggested as a site for agriculture for Tristan Islanders, which would have reduced habitat and risked the introduction of invasive species. However the island was declared a nature reserve by the Tristan da Cunha Island Council in 1994. Access to the island is restricted now, although Tristan Islanders are still permitted to visit the island to collect firewood and guano. Introduced New Zealand flax has been removed from the island, and the island now has a management plan. Other suggestions for securing this species' future include increased education on biosecurity for the local community, and potentially setting up a captive population. It has also been suggested that backup populations be established on other secure islands, for example Nightingale Island, in case predators reached Inaccessible Island, but this may have negative impacts on the endemic invertebrate faunas of these islands.

== See also ==
- Wake Island rail (Extinct flightless rail on remote Pacific island)
