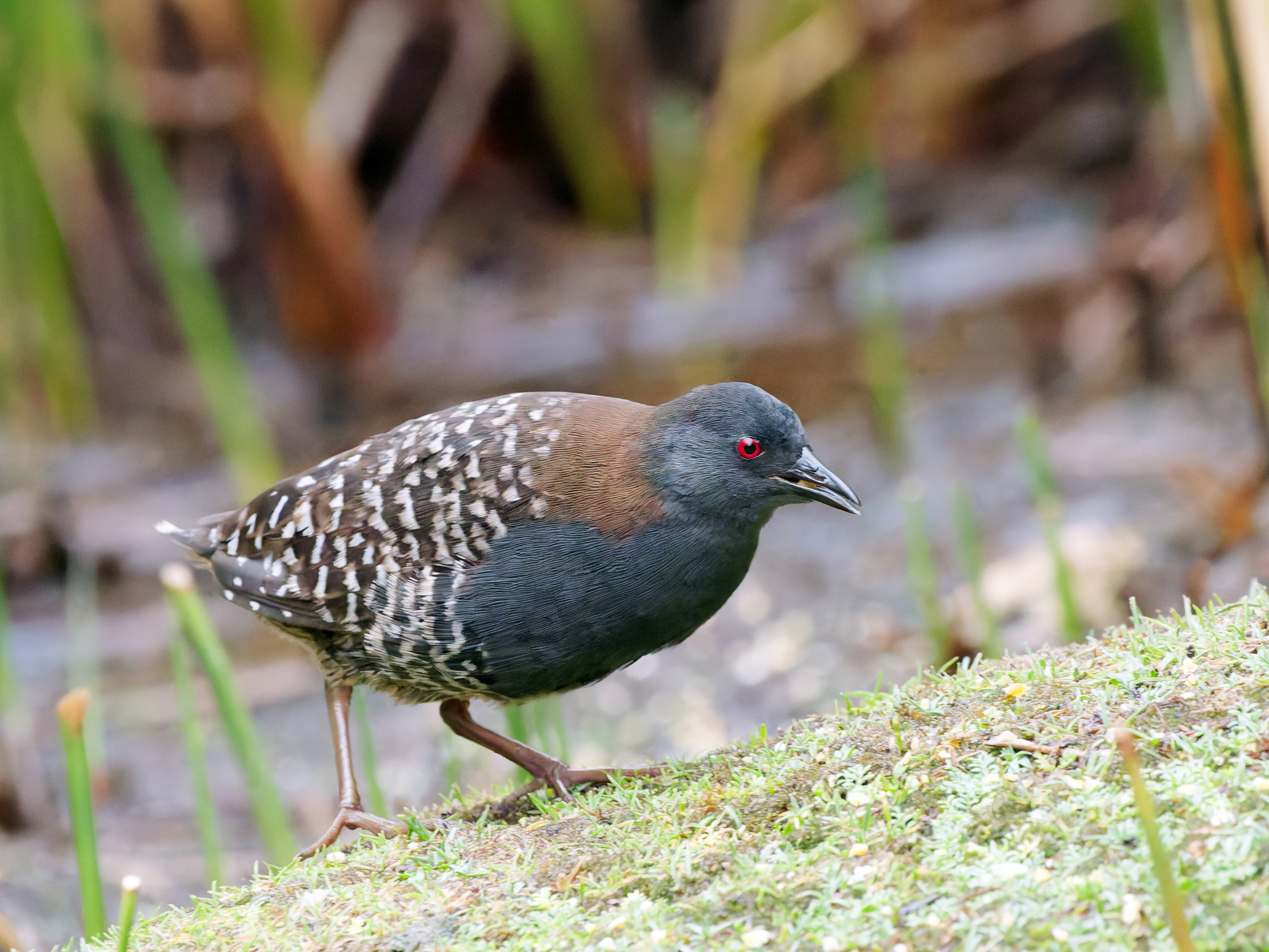

Conservation status
- Endangered (IUCN 3.1)

Scientific classification
- Kingdom: Animalia
- Phylum: Chordata
- Class: Aves
- Order: Gruiformes
- Family: Rallidae
- Genus: Laterallus
- Species: L. jamaicensis
- Subspecies: L. j. tuerosi

Trinomial name
- Laterallus jamaicensis tuerosi Fjeldså, 1983

= Junin crake =

Subspecies of bird

The Junin crake or Junin rail (Laterallus jamaicensis tuerosi) is an elusive and rare bird in the family Rallidae found only in marshy habitats around Lake Junin in the Andean highlands of west-central Peru.

The taxonomic position of the Junin crake is disputed: It was first described as a subspecies of the black rail in 1983 and in later years it has variably been considered a black rail subspecies or its own species. Its plumage is highly distinct compared to other black rail subspecies, but its voice is rather similar to those of the two other South American subspecies (L. j. murivagans of coastal Peru and L. j. salinasi of Chile and Argentina), although it does show some differences. However, their voices are quite distinct from the voices of black rails of North America. Preliminary evidence also suggests that the Galapagos crake, another member of this species complex, has a voice that resembles that of the South American black rails.

Regardless of its taxonomic position, the Junin crake is seriously threatened, mostly due to habitat loss, and it is considered endangered by the IUCN. Several other threatened animals, including two birds, the Junin grebe (Podiceps taczanowskii) and the Junin white-tufted grebe (Rollandia rolland), are restricted to the same lake.
