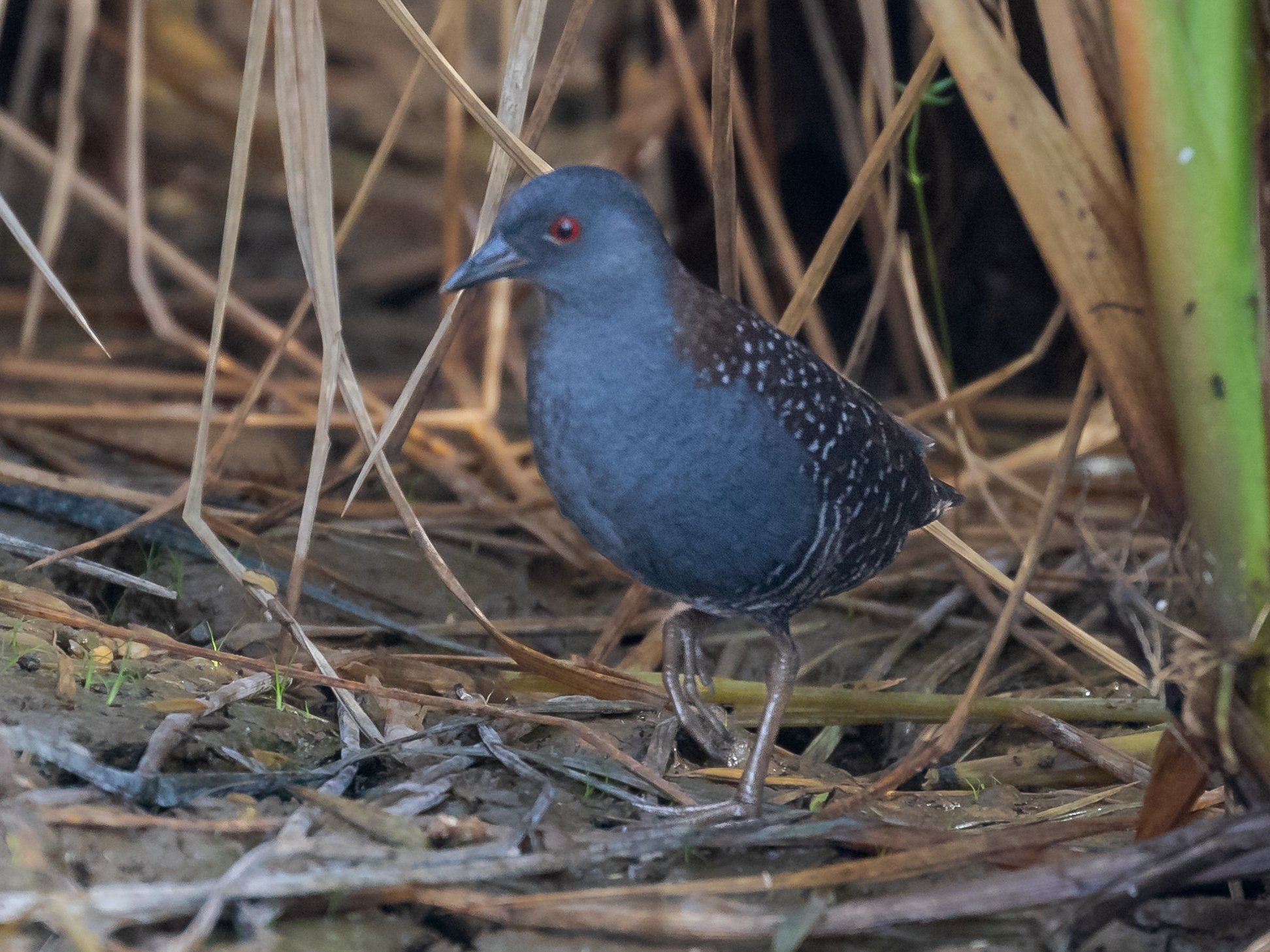
- Black rail in Maranhão, Brazil

Conservation status
- Endangered (IUCN 3.1)

Scientific classification
- Kingdom: Animalia
- Phylum: Chordata
- Class: Aves
- Order: Gruiformes
- Family: Rallidae
- Genus: Laterallus
- Species: L. jamaicensis

Binomial name
- Laterallus jamaicensis (Gmelin, JF, 1789)
- Breeding Year-round Non-breeding

= Black rail =

Species of bird

The Black rail (Laterallus jamaicensis) is a mouse-sized member of the rail family Rallidae, commonly found in marshes and wetlands over both North and South America. They typically range from 4.7-5.9 inches long, with a wingspan of 8.7-10.2 inches. It is estimated that there at roughly 52,000 breeding individuals globally, but getting exact estimates are difficult due to the bird's reserved nature and scattered data. Estimates from fossil and genetic evidence indicate that the Black rail has roots back to roughly 3.3-3.5 million years ago, when their genus (Latterallus) starts to appear.

== Taxonomy ==
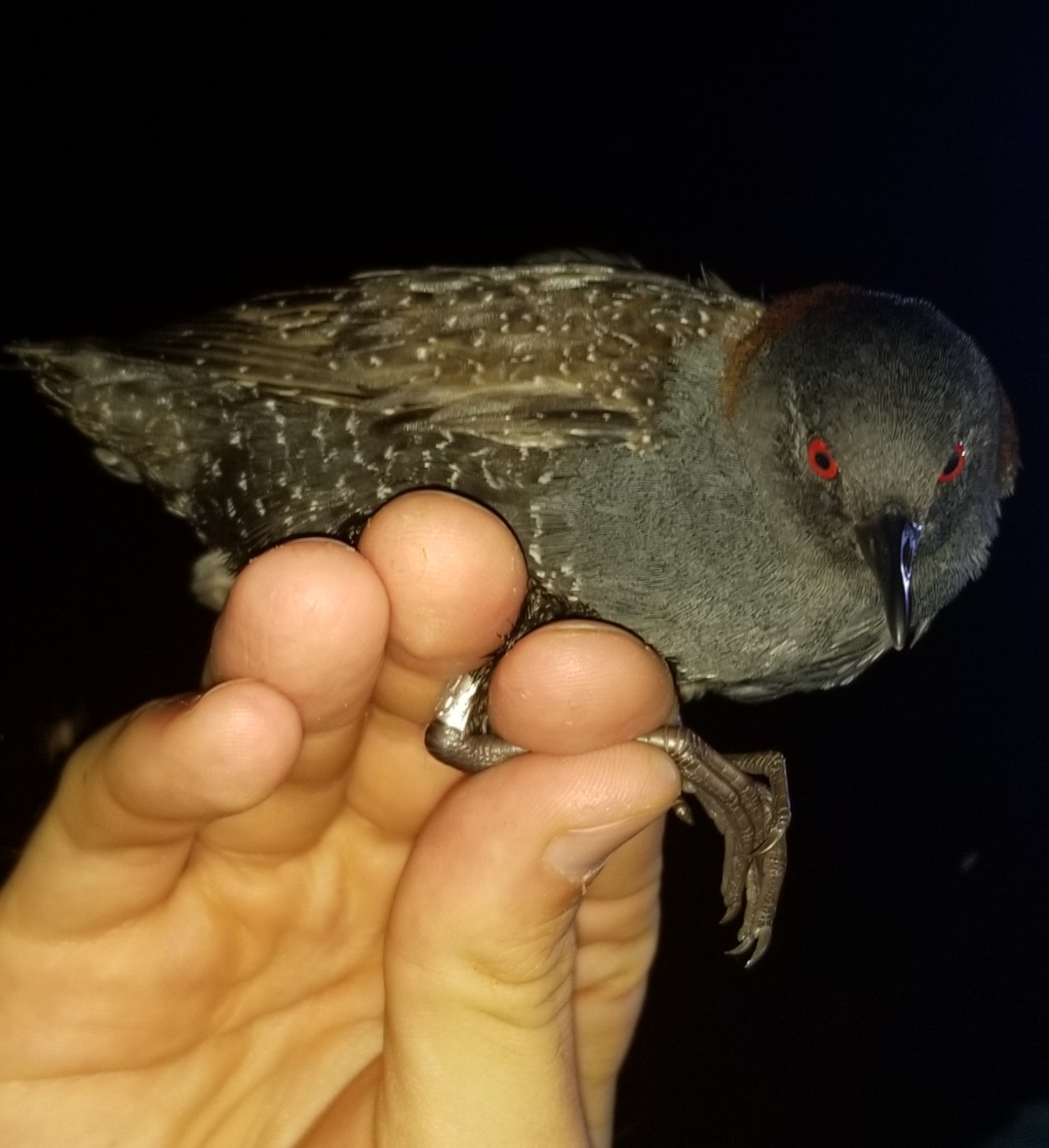
Eastern black rail (L. j. jamaicensis) caught for a scientific banding project in Cameron Parish, Louisiana, United States

The black rail was formally described in 1789 by the German naturalist Johann Friedrich Gmelin in his revised and expanded edition of Carl Linnaeus's Systema Naturae. He placed it with all the rails in the genus Rallus and coined the binomial name Rallus jamaicensis. Gmelin based his description on the "Least water hen" that had been described and illustrated in 1760 by the English naturalist George Edwards in his Gleanings of Natural History. Edwards had obtained a preserved specimen that had been brought to London from Jamaica by Patrick Browne. Browne had briefly mentioned the rail in his book "The Civil and Natural History of Jamaica". The black rail is now placed with 12 other small rails and crakes in the genus Laterallus that was introduced in 1855 by George Robert Gray. The genus name is a portmanteau of Rallus lateralis, a synonym of the binomial name for the rufous-sided crake, the type species of the genus. The specific epithet jamaicensis is from "Jamaica", the type locality.

There are five recognized subspecies:

Image	Subspecies	Description
	L. j. coturniculus (Ridgway, 1874)	Common name: California Black Rail; Found in the fresh and salt water marshes of California and Arizona; Distinguished from other species with its shorter bill, a brown crown and upper back; Was listed as endangered by the California Fish and Game Commission in 1971 due to wetland habitat loss
	L. j. jamaicensis (Gmelin, JF, 1789)	Common name: Eastern Black Rail; Found in the eastern North America, the Caribbean, and Central America; Nicknamed "feathered mouse"; Distinguished by grey crown and light brown nape; Partially migratory with breeding in central United States and eastern north United States for wintering; Declared threatened by The US Fish and Wildlife Service under the Endangered Species Act in 2020
	L. j. murivagans (Riley, 1916)	Commonly known as "Southern South America Black Rail"; Found in the costal marshes in Peru; Distinguished by other species with feathers being paler in color and white stripes on the undertail; Considered very "secretive"; Likely faces the same threats as L. j. coturniculus and L. j. jamaicensis therefore thought that that the population is declining at the same rate
	L. j. salinasi (Philippi, 1857)	Commonly known as "Black Rail salinasi"; Found in Central Chile and some parts of Argentina; Largest in size out of the 5 subspecies; Distinguished by its large size and the large rufus patch on the upper back; Similar to L. j. murivagans, L. j. salinasi likely faces the same threats as L. j. coturniculus and L. j. jamaicensis therefore belived to have declining population at the same rate
	L. j. tuerosi Fjeldså, 1983	Common name: Junín rail or Junín crake; Only found in the marshes of Lake Junín in the Andean highlands of Peru; Distinguished by its plain undertail and pale tarsus; Currently listed as endangered due to the high pollution, increased grazing pressure, and man made changes of the water level within its limited range

Due to the overall secretive nature of this species, their taxonomy is in need of review. The Junín rail is specifically has been thought to be its own species rather than a subspecies. This is due to its distinctive brown plumage, its slight differences in vocalizations and it being isolated to one habitat. While the vocalizations show some differences, generally resembles that of the two other South American subspecies, L. j. murivagans and L. j. salinasi. However, their voices are quite distinct from the voices of black rails of North America. Preliminary evidence also suggests that the Galapagos crake, another member of the black rail species complex, has a voice that resembles that of the South American black rails. Genetic data is lacking for most members of the complex, except the Galapagos crake which diverged from the North American black rail about 1.2 million years ago.

== Description ==
The eastern Black rail is described to be a small, chickenlike bird with a short bill, short wings, and strong lower extremities. Between both sexes, Black rails typically weigh 29–35 g, are 10–15 cm in length, and have a wingspan of 22–28 cm. Adults sport dark grey/black feathers with the lower parts of their wings and tail feathers being speckled white. Both the beak and legs are typically dark in color, although the Junín rail deviates from the rest with pale legs. Juveniles have noticeably less white markings with the eyes being brown which gradually becomes red at around 3 months old. The eastern Black rail is the smallest rail in North America.

Due to its territorial nature the Black rail will often make its presence known by its vocalizations. In North America, males have a distinctive kick-ee-kerr call or an aggressive, presumably territorial, growl (kerrr-kerrr-kerrr). Females may give a coo-coo-coo call. These vocalizations are primarily uttered during the night, when these birds are most vocal. The peak of vocalization is during the first two weeks of May, when breeding and courtship behaviors are also at their peak. The South American subspecies have a noticeably different range of vocalizations.

== Distribution and habitat ==
The Laterallus species is found in scattered parts of North America, the Caribbean, and South America, usually in coastal salt marshes but also in some freshwater marshes. The most suitable habitat for the Black Rail are high marshes. High marsh habitats provide an ideal environment for the Black Rail, as it spends most of its time concealed within the vegetation found in this area. The bird's unique habitat is primarily driven by its foraging habits. They forage by walking through short waters or on the ground. While the Black Rail stays in the drier areas of the marsh, it strategically selects locations adjacent to the low marsh regions that experience occasional inundation during spring tides. These moist parts of the marsh serve as essential foraging grounds where the Black Rail can find mud-dwelling invertebrates. The dry areas provide safe spaces for nesting by protecting their nests from flooding during high tide. The high marsh habitat is characterized by large stretches of grasses interspersed with patches of open salt panne. The salt panne is typically dry for the majority of the year but experiences periodic flooding during extreme spring tides. In the Florida Gulf Coast marshes, one of the most common grass species in the high marsh is the marsh-hay cordgrass, which is favored by the Black Rail. It is extinct or threatened in many locations due to habitat loss. The largest populations in North America reside in Florida and California.

== Behavior and ecology ==
The black rail is rarely seen and therefore very difficult to study. Males are extremely territorial and establish their territories from late winter through spring. To establish dominance in these areas, some males will sing their specific song day and night while others primarily sing at night. Due to their small size, they make easy prey to Great Blue Herons, Great Egrets, Northern Harriers, and owls. Their eggs however have been preyed on by raccoons, foxes, cats, and snakes. Flooding in their habitats make the rails and their nests more vulnerable to predators.

=== Breeding ===
Male Rails become more territorial during the breeding season, low growls are vocalized between males that are competing with each other. Occasionally males will mate with two or more females, but most studies highlight Black Rails being monogamous. A Black Rail pair will stay by their nests and share duties taking care of the babies including incubation duties, and co-parenting once the eggs are hatched.

The nests of this bird are placed on the ground, in dense, swampy vegetation or in patches of flooded grass. The nests are bowl-shaped and built with vegetation loosely woven. The clutch of this bird usually consists of four to thirteen creamy white speckled, with reddish-brown spots, eggs. These eggs are roundish and measure around 23 by 17 millimeters (0.91 by 0.67 in). They are incubated by both parents, taking shifts of approximately one hour each, for 16 to 20 days. The precocial young then hatch. Males heavily defend the nest area with attacking intruders, showing behaviors of rattling, open wings and bill, hissing, and making aggressive calls.

In 2015, a breeding population of black rails in South Carolina was rediscovered using camera traps by state biologists.

In 2023, the first-ever breeding population of black rails in Louisiana was discovered using motion-activated camera traps. Researchers documented adults with at least one chick on two separate occasions.

=== Diet ===
The black rail is generalized as an opportunistic feeder and consumes a wide range of food. They've been recorded to consume different types of insects, commonly aquatic beetles. They have also been recorded to eat a variety of spiders, snails, and small crustaceans. During the winter their diet shifts to a more botanically, notably feeding on the seeds of bulrush and other marsh plants. The black rail typically forages in shallow parts of marshes by walking along the plants to pick off prey from the water, ground, or surrounding vegetation. Considering that these birds usually are vocal during the night, they feed along the water lines after high and low tide during the day.

=== Threats ===
Under the IUCN Red List, the black rail is listed as endangered with decreasing populations with estimates that there are between 10,000 – 50,000 mature individuals remaining. There are 8 main threats that the Eastern black rail faces, those being habitat fragmentation, altered hydrology, land management, climate change, environmental contaminants, disease, altered food webs, and human disturbance. Habitat fragmentation is the leading cause for the increase in speciation, endangerment, and extinction in many species across the world. Over half of the wetland habitats the United States of America have been destroyed since the 1780s. Specifically the wetland habitats face that the Black Rail depends on has been drained for development and conversion to agricultural land. The Black rail heavily depends on this habitat for safe cover and certain aspects of its life that it has coevolved with. The 2025 State of the Birds listed the Black Rail as a Red Alert Tipping Point species. Many of the former populations in the United States have declined or gone extinct as the wetlands continue to face habitat loss/fragmentation. In August 2025, the U.S. Fish and Wildlife Service released a draft recovery plan for the Eastern black rail. This draft plan estimated that it would cost $433 million and 60 years to save the eastern black rail from extinction.

In addition to declining populations and increasing threats, the black rail is also affected by the lack of scientific studies available. Because of the secretive and hard to observe nature of the bird, this species is one of the "most understudied marsh birds in North America".

They are preyed upon by many avian (hawks, egrets, and herons) and mammalian (foxes and cats) predators, and rely on the cover of thick marsh vegetation for protection. High tides are a dangerous time for black rails, as they are quite vulnerable to predation outside the marsh.
