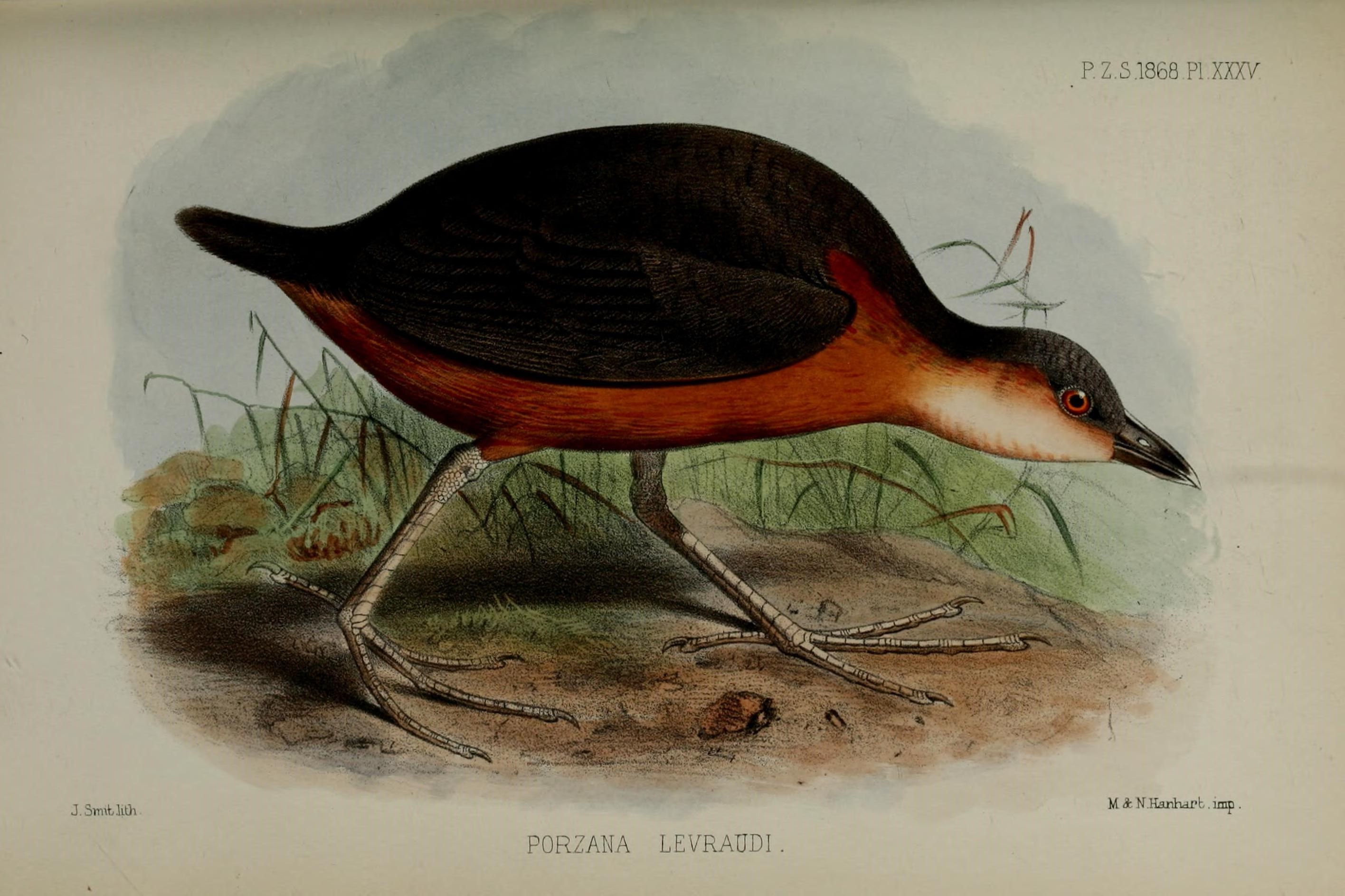

Conservation status
- Vulnerable (IUCN 3.1)

Scientific classification
- Kingdom: Animalia
- Phylum: Chordata
- Class: Aves
- Order: Gruiformes
- Family: Rallidae
- Genus: Laterallus
- Species: L. levraudi

Binomial name
- Laterallus levraudi (Sclater, PL & Salvin, 1869)

= Rusty-flanked crake =

Species of bird

The rusty-flanked crake (Laterallus levraudi) is a Vulnerable species of bird in subfamily Rallinae of family Rallidae, the rails, gallinules, and coots. It is endemic to Venezuela.

== Taxonomy and systematics ==
The rusty-flanked crake is monotypic. Some authors treat it and the rufous-sided crake (Laterallus melanophaius) as a superspecies.

== Description ==
The rusty-flanked crake is 14 to 16.5 cm (5.5 to 6.5 in) long. The sexes are alike. They have dark olive brown upperparts and red flanks. Their underparts are red except for a white throat and center of the breast.

== Distribution and habitat ==
The rusty-flanked crake is found only in Venezuela north of the Orinoco River, mostly coastally and somewhat inland along the western flank of the Andes. It inhabits a variety of wet lowland landscapes including swamps, marshes, lagoons, lakeshores, and flooded pastures. In elevation it ranges from about 20 to 600 m (66 to 2,000 ft).

== Behavior ==
=== Movement ===
The rusty-flanked crake is not known to migrate.

=== Feeding ===
The rusty-flanked crake's foraging technique and diet have not been documented but are assumed to be similar to those of congeners. They usually forage on the ground or in shallow water, mostly for insects but also feeding on seeds.

=== Breeding ===
Nothing is known about the rusty-flanked crake's breeding biology.

=== Vocalization ===
The rusty-flanked crake's song is "an abrupt, loose churring" sometimes preceded by single notes: "ti ... ti .. ti.ti.trrrrrrrrrrrrrr". It is especially vocal during the morning, and in May to July.

== Status ==
The IUCN originally assessed the rusty-flanked crake in 1988 as Threatened, then in 1994 as Vulnerable and in 2000 as Endangered. In 2018 it was again assessed as Vulnerable. It has a limited range which is however larger than thought in the past. Its estimated population of between 1000 and 2500 mature individuals is believed to be decreasing. Degradation and destruction of its habitat by industrial waste, tourist development, agriculture, and dam expansion are the principal threats. It appears to be locally common and "conversion of largely-forested regions to pastureland with water-bodies may favour this crake."
