= Ascension crake =

- Drawing by Peter Mundy, 1656

Conservation status
- Extinct (IUCN 3.1)

Scientific classification
- Kingdom: Animalia
- Phylum: Chordata
- Class: Aves
- Order: Gruiformes
- Family: Rallidae
- Genus: †Mundia; Bourne, Ashmole, & Simmons, 2003
- Species: †M. elpenor

Binomial name
- †Mundia elpenor (Olson, 1973)
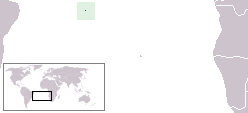
- Location of Ascension Island

Extinct species of bird

The Ascension crake (Mundia elpenor) is an extinct flightless bird that previously lived on Ascension Island in the South Atlantic Ocean. Like many other flightless birds on isolated islands, it was a rail. It was declared extinct by Groombridge in 1994; BirdLife International confirmed this in 2000 and 2004.

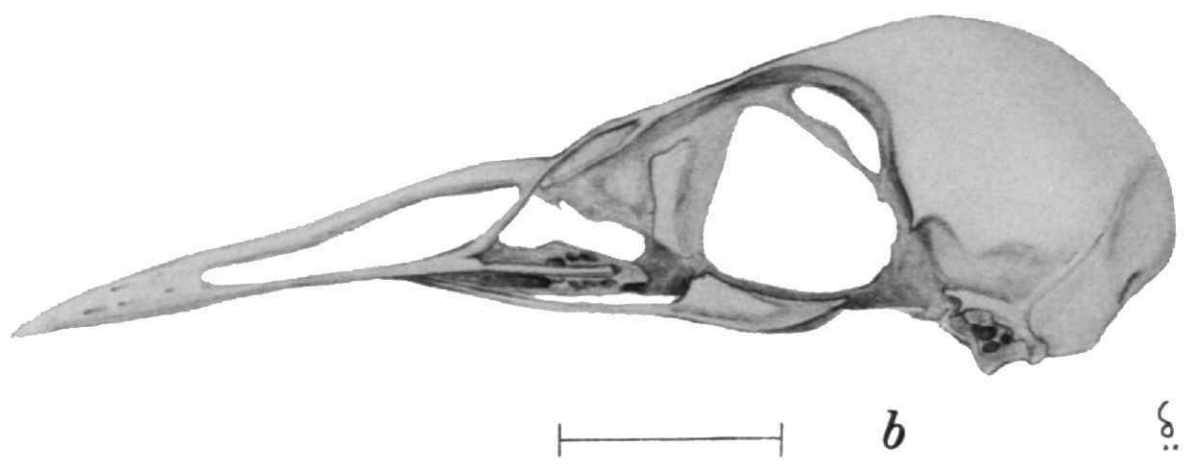
Drawing of the skull

The bird was endemic to Ascension Island. Numerous subfossil bones of the bird have been found in deposits at the base of vertical fumaroles. Peter Mundy, a 17th-century merchant and traveler gave an account of the bird and made a sketch of it when he visited Ascension Island in June 1656. It was described by Mundy as:

a strange kind of fowle, much bigger than our sterlings ore stares: collour gray or dappled, white and blacke feathers intermixed, eies red like rubies, wings very imperfitt, such as wherewith they cannot raise themselves from the ground. They were taken running, in which they are exceeding swift, helping themselves a little with their wings (as it is said of the estridge), shortt billed, cloven footed, that can neither fly nor swymme.

It most likely lived in the near-desert areas of the island and primarily ate sooty tern (Onychoprion fuscatus) eggs. It is probable that it became extinct after rats were introduced to the island in the 18th century, but it may have survived until the introduction of feral cats in 1815.

The bird was regarded by Storrs Olson as a relative of the Inaccessible Island rail (Laterallus rogersi), but recent analysis (Bourne et al., 2003) has shown that the differences between the two are greater than previously appreciated. The new genus Mundia (named after the discoverer Peter Mundy) was created in 2003.
