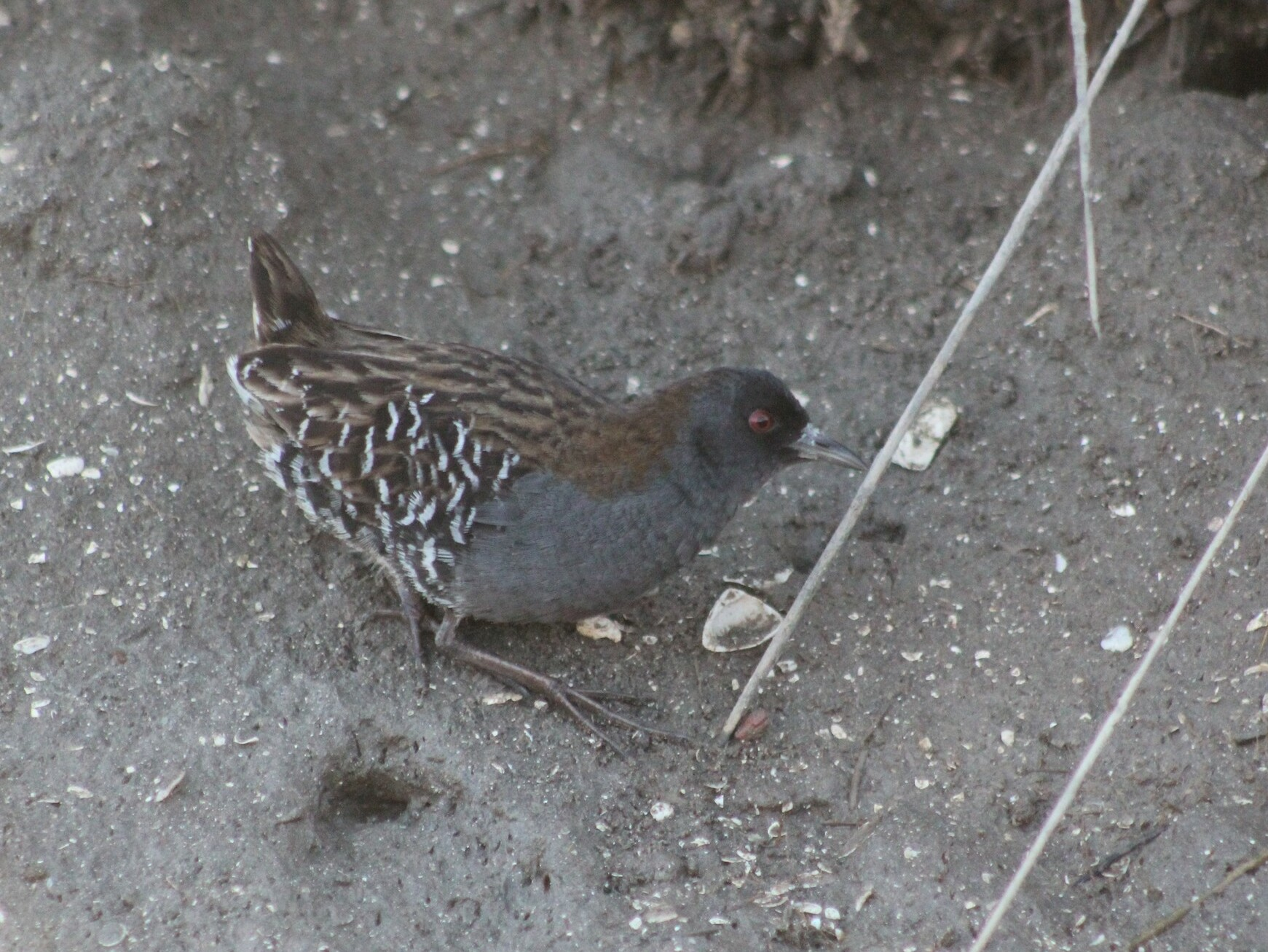

Conservation status
- Near Threatened (IUCN 3.1)

Scientific classification
- Kingdom: Animalia
- Phylum: Chordata
- Class: Aves
- Order: Gruiformes
- Family: Rallidae
- Genus: Laterallus
- Species: L. spiloptera

Binomial name
- Laterallus spiloptera (Durnford, 1877)

Synonyms
- Laterallus spilopterus; Porzana spiloptera

= Dot-winged crake =

Species of bird

The dot-winged crake (Laterallus spiloptera) is a near threatened species of bird in subfamily Rallinae of family Rallidae, the rails, gallinules, and coots. It is found in Argentina, Brazil, Chile, and Uruguay.

== Taxonomy and systematics ==
The dot-winged crake was originally described in genus Porzana. However, phylogenetic analyses of mitochondrial DNA by Garcia et al. (2014) placed it in the predominantly South American clade Laterallus. Stervander et al. (2019) demonstrated that it is the sister species of the world's smallest flightless bird, the Inaccessible Island rail Laterallus rogersi (previously placed in the monotypic genus Atlantisia) and should bear the binomial Laterallus spilopterus, which was supported by Kirchman et al. (2021).

There is a small amount of disagreement regarding the species' binomial name as of 2026, with the International Ornithological Committee (IOC) and eBird/Clements taxonomies using Laterallus spiloptera, and BirdLife International's Handbook of the Birds of the World using Laterallus spilopterus. The South American Classification Committee of the American Ornithological Society (SACC) declined a proposal to move the species to Laterallus, currently maintaining it as Porzana spiloptera.

The worldwide taxonomic systems agree that the species is monotypic.

== Description ==
The dot-winged crake is 14 to 15 cm (5.5 to 5.9 in) long. The sexes are alike. Their upperparts are dark olive brown with blackish streaks and some white markings on the flight feathers. Their face and breast are dark gray and their vent area and undertail coverts are barred black and white.

== Distribution and habitat ==
The dot-winged crake's distribution is unsettled. The IOC and Clements place it in southern Uruguay and northern Argentina. The Cornell Lab of Ornithology's Birds of the World adds Brazil's southernmost state, Rio Grande do Sul, and the SACC adds Chile to those three countries. Cornell's eBird has records in all four countries.

The dot-winged crake inhabits freshwater and brackish waters and some drier landscapes as well. It is found in freshwater and tidal marshes, swamps, wet meadows, grasslands, and riparian scrub.

== Behavior ==
=== Movement ===
No movements are known for the dot-winged crake.

=== Feeding ===
The dot-winged crake feeds on insects, seeds, and marsh vegetation. Its foraging technique has not been documented.

=== Breeding ===
A dot-winged crake nest was discovered near Buenos Aires but no details of it or any other aspects of the species' breeding biology are known.

=== Vocalization ===
The dot-winged crake's song is " a high note followed by a lower-pitched rattle 'kee-krrrrr'" that is repeated several times. Its calls include "a mellow soft 'pwup' and a scolding rattle."

== Status ==
The IUCN originally assessed the dot-winged crake as Threatened. In 1994 the assessment was updated to Vulnerable, and again to Near Threatened in 2025. Its range is small and fragmented, and as of 2025, its estimated population of 8,000-19,999 mature individuals is believed to be decreasing. Conversion of wetlands to agriculture, especially grazing with accompanying burning, appears to be the main threat. Other wetlands have been flooded. It occurs in a few protected areas but "[d]istributional surveys [are] urgently needed within [the] species' limited range".
