= Henry Martyn Rogers =

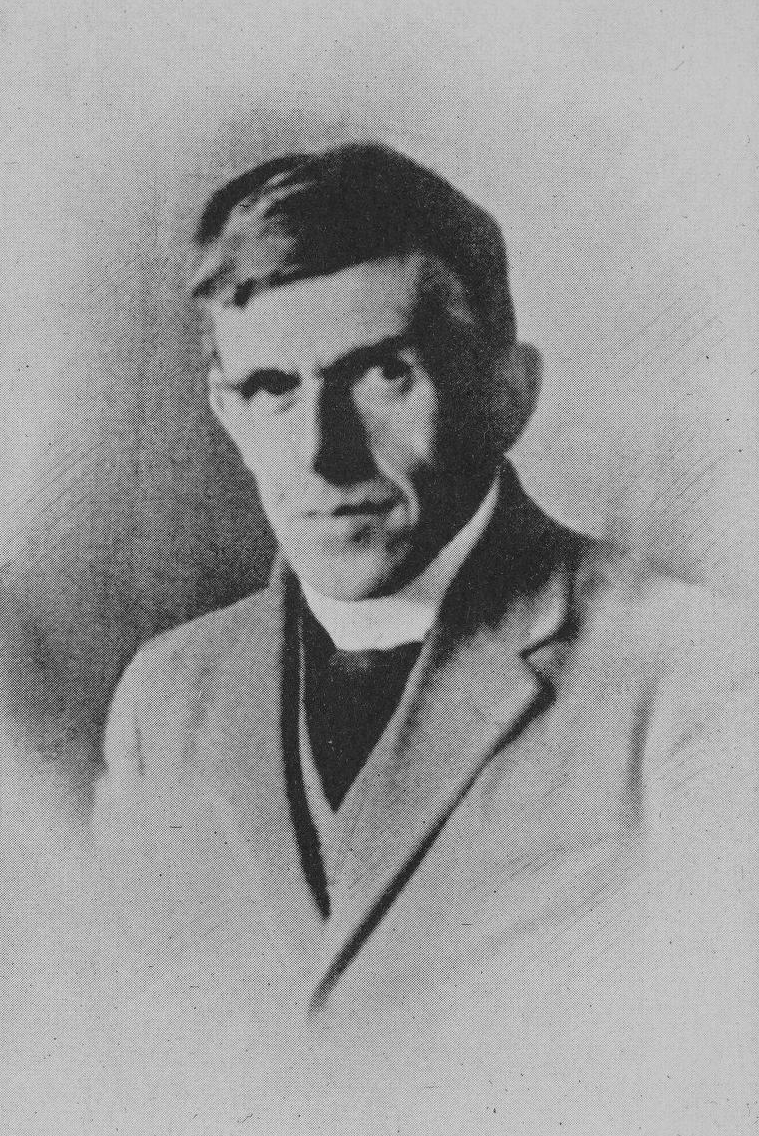

Henry Martyn Cheselden Rogers (February 22, 1879 – May 14, 1926) was an Anglican missionary and teacher who worked in the British territory of Tristan da Cunha. It was during his tenure on the island that he discovered the bird species that has been named after him as Atlantisia rogersi. It is the smallest flightless bird in the world.

== Life and work ==
Rogers was a curate-in-charge at Alexton, Uppingham. A London solicitor named Douglas M. Gane had founded the Tristan da Cunha fund and after the departure of Rev. J.G. Barrow in 1921 he posted an opening for a missionary and schoolmaster on the island of Tristan da Cunha in the newspapers. Rogers responded through the Society for the Propagation of the Gospel and they chose to take up the position along with his wife Rose. He was the fourth priest to serve there after William F. Taylor, Edward Heron Dodgson (brother of Lewis Carroll) and John Graham Barrow. Rogers and his wife travelled to Cape Town aboard Kinfauns Castle and then boarded the Tacoma Maru owned by the Osaka Shosen Kaisha Line under Captain Kamaiashi. They reached Tristan da Cunha on 1 April 1922. The couple worked to establish a St. Mary's Church and a school.

Rogers explored the natural history of the region and went to the island of Inaccessible where sea-birds nested. Here he was able to see the Tristan finch and also saw a small flightless bird in the rail family that lived in burrows. The Shackleton-Rowett expedition and its naturalist Wilkins tried to get a specimen of the bird but failed. He was able to obtain two specimens of the bird on 5 July 1923 and this was sent to the British Museum of Natural History. Atlantissia rogersi was named after Rogers by Percy Lowe in 1923. Rogers died in 1926 and his life on the island was described by his widow Rose in the book The Lonely Island (1927).
