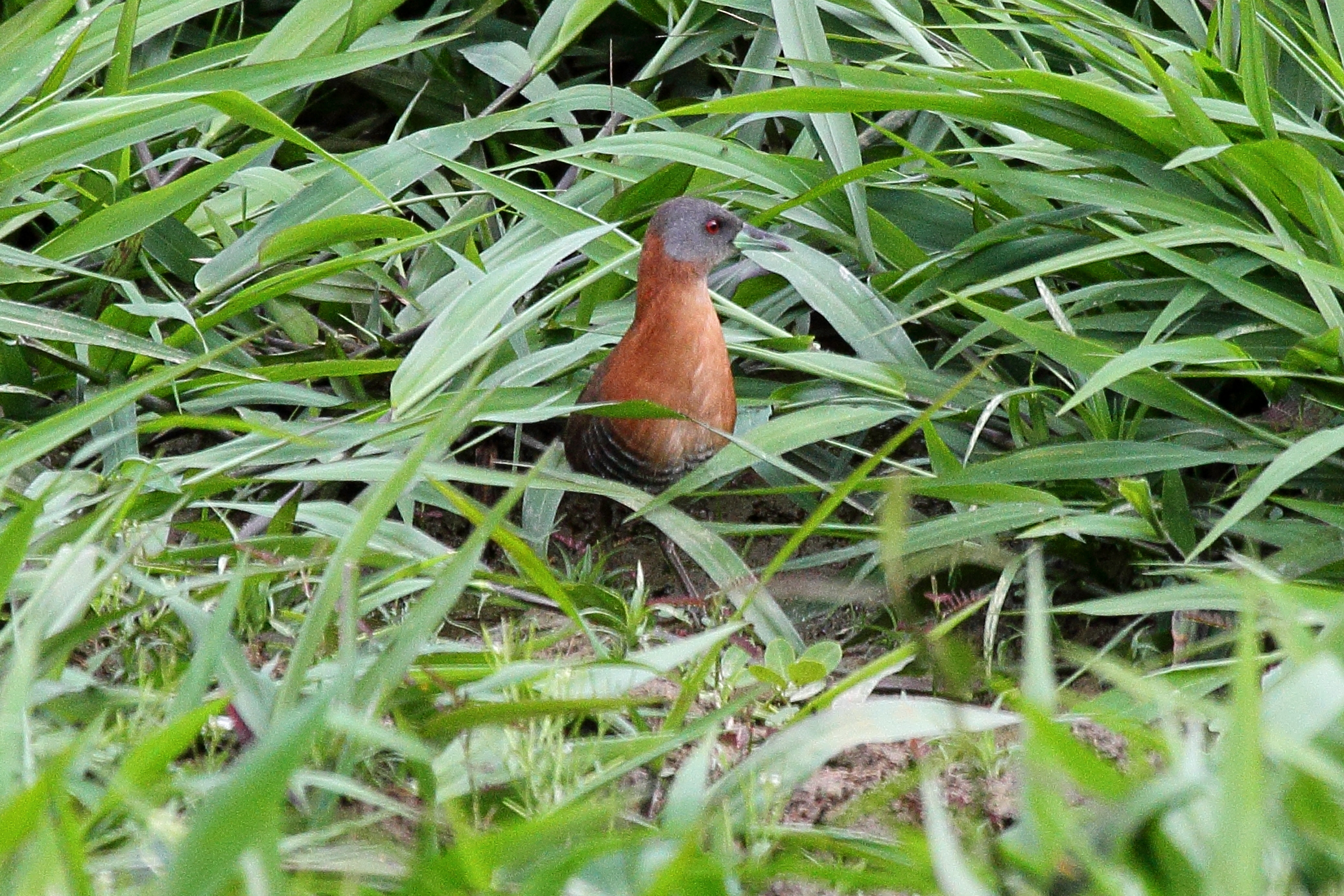
- With grey face, Costa Rica
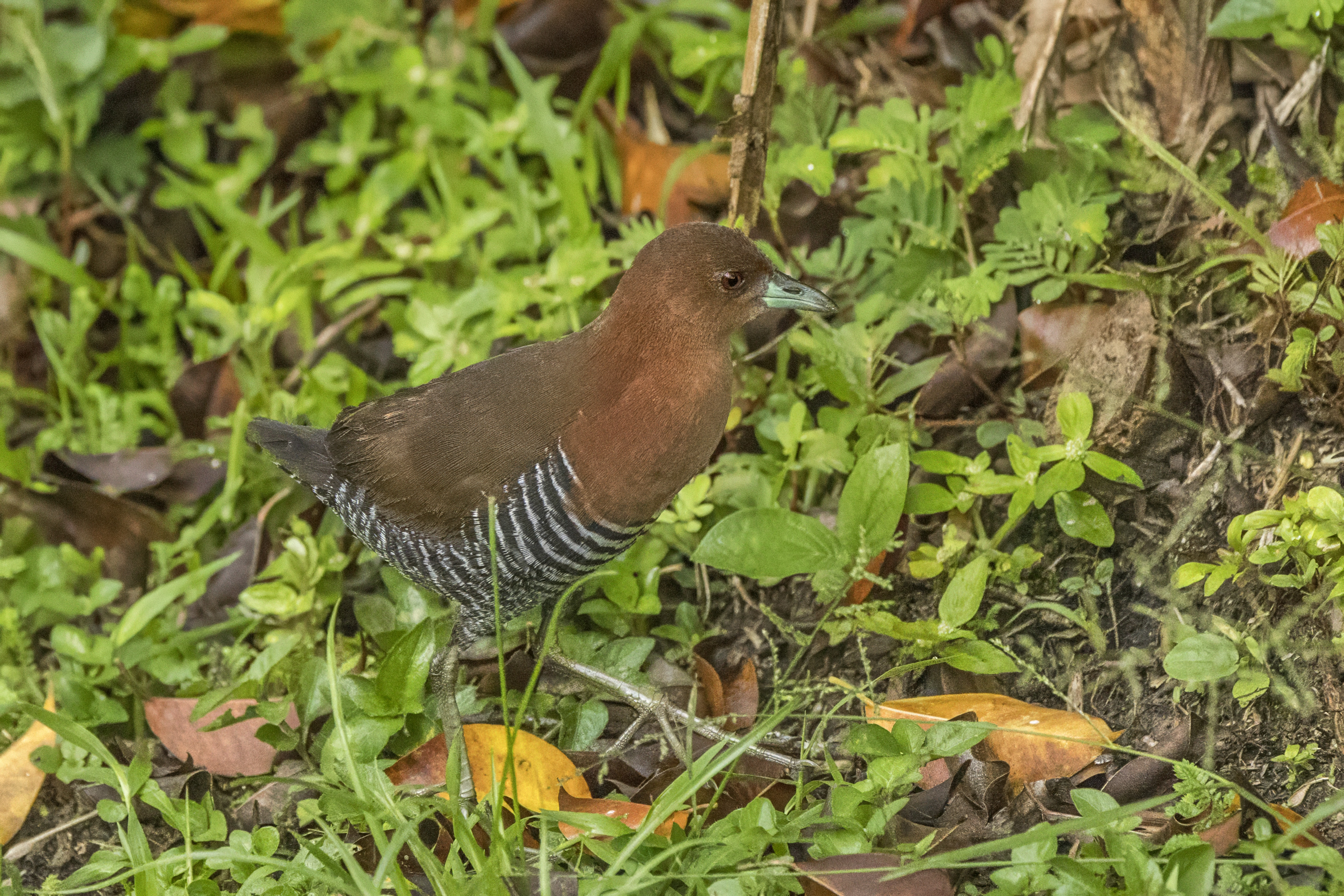
- Rufous-faced, Colombia

Conservation status
- Least Concern (IUCN 3.1)

Scientific classification
- Kingdom: Animalia
- Phylum: Chordata
- Class: Aves
- Order: Gruiformes
- Family: Rallidae
- Genus: Laterallus
- Species: L. albigularis

Binomial name
- Laterallus albigularis (Lawrence, 1861)

= White-throated crake =

Species of bird

The white-throated crake (Laterallus albigularis) is a species of bird in subfamily Rallinae of family Rallidae, the rails, gallinules, and coots. It is found in Colombia, Costa Rica, Ecuador, Honduras, Nicaragua, Panama, and Venezuela.

== Taxonomy and systematics ==
The white-throated crake was for a time treated as a subspecies of the rufous-sided crake (L. melanophaius). As a species in its own right, it has three subspecies, the nominate L. a. albigularis, L. a. cinereiceps, and L. a. cerdaleus.

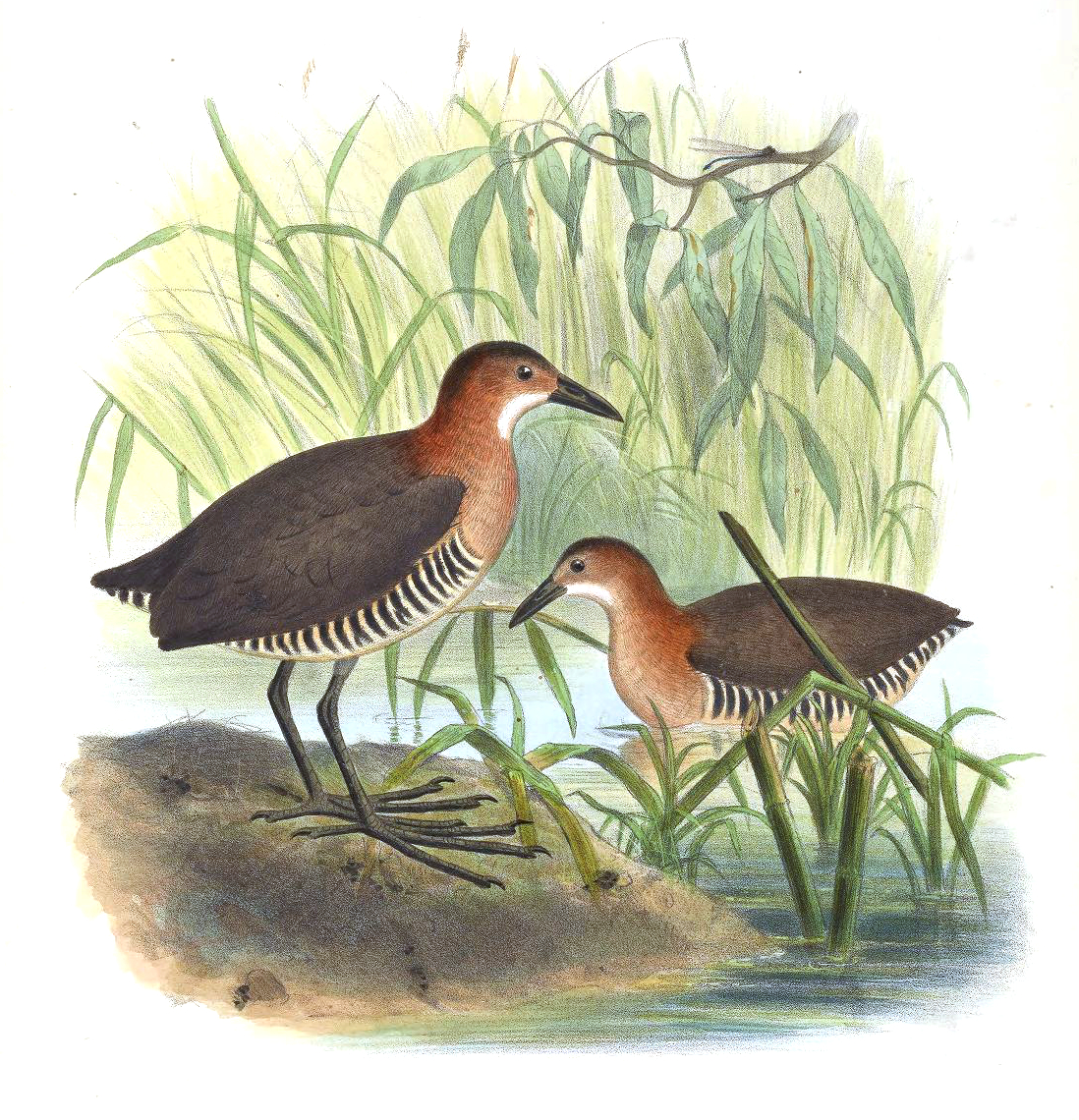
Illustration by Joseph Smit, 1869

== Description ==
The white-throated crake is 14 to 16 cm (5.5 to 6.3 in) long. Males weigh about 50 g (1.8 oz) and females 45 g (1.6 oz). The sexes are alike. Adults of the nominate subspecies have a white throat and upper breast and a rufous face, sides of the neck, and lower breast. Their crown, nape, and upperparts are olive brown. Their belly, vent, and undertail coverts are barred black and white. Subspecies L. a. cinereiceps has a gray face and L. a. cerdaleus has an entirely rufous head and throat.

== Distribution and habitat ==
The nominate subspecies of white-throated crake is found along the Pacific side of southwestern Costa Rica and Panama and through northern and western Colombia into western Ecuador as far south as El Oro Province. L. a. cerdaleus is found in northern Colombia and extreme northwestern Venezuela. L. a. cinereiceps is found from southeastern Honduras along the Caribbean slope of Nicaragua and Costa Rica and into Panama as far as Veraguas Province. The nominate subspecies has also occurred in Peru as a vagrant.

The white-throated crake inhabits a variety of both wet and dry landscapes including marshes, wet grassy fields and pastures, thickets, forest clearings, and the edges of watercourses and ponds. In elevation it ranges from sea level to 1,600 m (5,200 ft).

== Behavior ==
=== Movement ===
The white-throated crake is generally sedentary but may relocate locally to higher ground during the rainy season.

=== Feeding ===
The white-throated crake usually forages in cover but will move into the open at dawn and dusk and during rainy weather. Its diet includes insects, spiders, grass and sedge seeds, algae, and some small fruits.

=== Breeding ===
The white-throated crake's breeding season varies geographically. It makes a sperical nest of woven grass stems and leaves with a side entrance, placed in a bush or grass tussock over water or ground. The typical clutch size is two to five eggs.

=== Vocalization ===
The white-throated crake makes an "[a]brupt, explosive descending trill or churr"; its alarm call is "a sharp 'chip'" note.

== Status ==
The IUCN has assessed the white-throated crake as being of Least Concern. It has a large range but its population size and trend are not known. No immediate threats have been identified. It is [v]ery difficult to see and status unclear.
