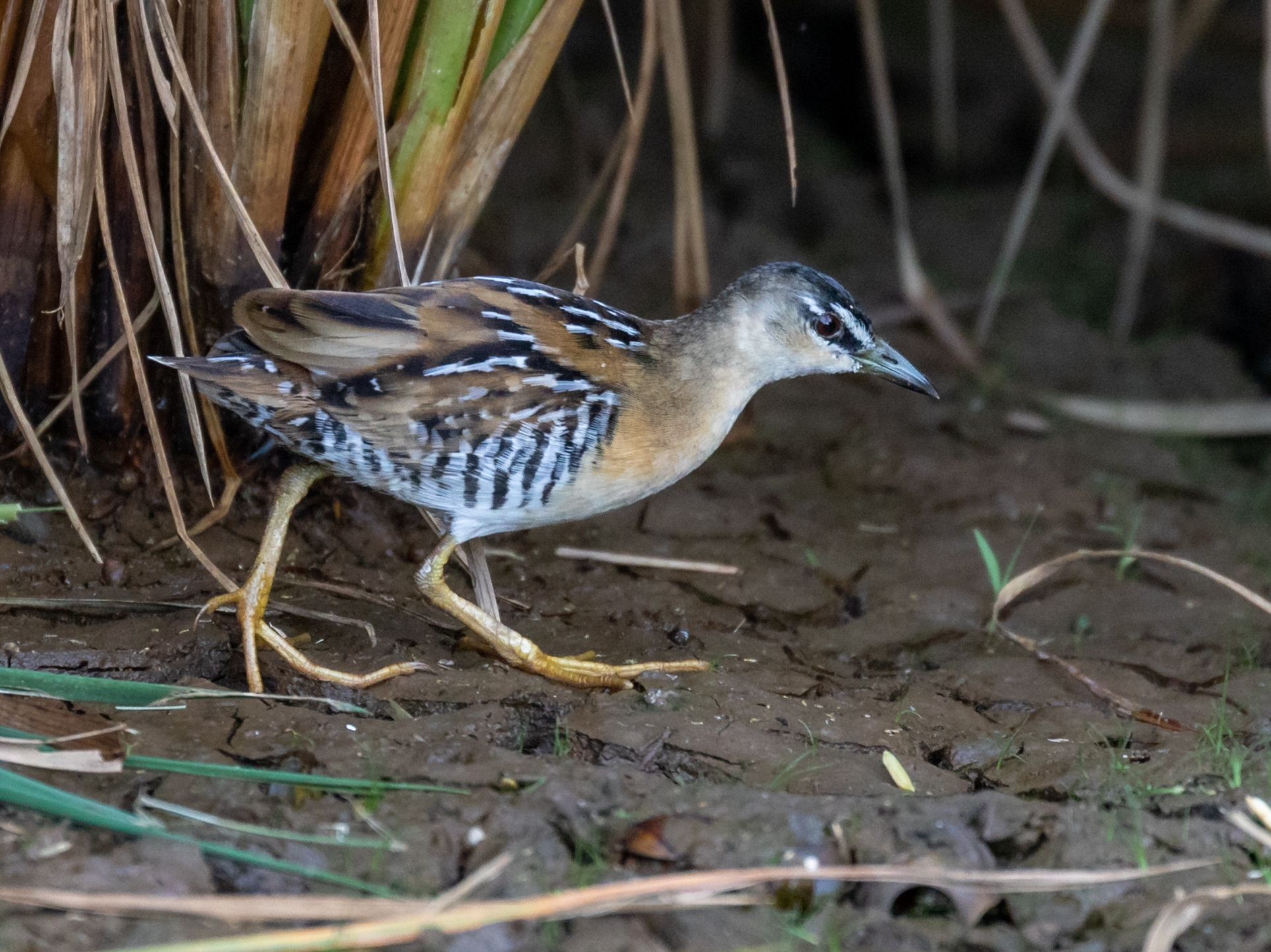
- at Arari, Maranhão, Brazil

Conservation status
- Least Concern (IUCN 3.1)

Scientific classification
- Kingdom: Animalia
- Phylum: Chordata
- Class: Aves
- Order: Gruiformes
- Family: Rallidae
- Genus: Laterallus
- Species: L. flaviventer

Binomial name
- Laterallus flaviventer (Boddaert, 1783)

Synonyms
- Micropygia flaviventer (Boddaert, 1783); Poliolimnas flaviventer (Boddaert, 1783); Hapalocrex flaviventer Porzana flaviventer

= Yellow-breasted crake =

Species of bird

The yellow-breasted crake (Laterallus flaviventer) is a species of bird in the subfamily Rallinae of family Rallidae, the rails, gallinules, and coots. It is found on several Caribbean islands and in most of Central America and South America.

== Taxonomy and systematics ==
The yellow-breasted crake was described by the French polymath Georges-Louis Leclerc, Comte de Buffon in 1781 in his Histoire Naturelle des Oiseaux. The bird was also illustrated in a hand-colored plate engraved by François-Nicolas Martinet in the Planches Enluminées D'Histoire Naturelle which was produced under the supervision of Edme-Louis Daubenton to accompany Buffon's text. Neither the plate caption nor Buffon's description included a scientific name but in 1783 the Dutch naturalist Pieter Boddaert coined the binomial name Rallus flaviventer in his catalogue of the Planches Enluminées. The yellow-breasted crake was next placed in the genus Porzana and was erected by the French ornithologist Louis Pierre Vieillot in 1816. That generic name is the Venetian word for the small crakes. The specific epithet combines the Latin flavus meaning "yellow" with venter meaning "belly".

However, the yellow-breasted crake's taxonomy has not been resolved. It was formerly sometimes placed in the obsolete genus Poliolimnas or united with the Ocellated crake in Micropygia. Phylogenetic analyses of mitochondrial DNA revealed that it is not a part of Porzana proper, and instead belongs within the Coturnicops–Laterallus clade.

As of late 2022 the International Ornithological Committee and BirdLife International's Handbook of the Birds of the World place the yellow-breasted crake in genus Laterallus. The North American Classification Committee of the American Ornithological Society (AOS) and the Clements taxonomy place it in the monotypic genus Hapalocrex. The South American Classification Committee of AOS retains it in genus Porzana after rejecting Laterallus but is seeking a proposal to move it to Hapalocrex.

The worldwide taxonomic systems agree that the yellow-breasted crake has these five subspecies:

- L. f. gossii (Bonaparte, 1856);
- L. f. hendersoni Bartsch, 1917;
- L. f. woodi van Rossem, 1934;
- L. f. bangsi Darlington, 1931;
- L. f. flaviventer (Boddaert, 1783).

== Description ==
The yellow-breasted crake is 12.5 to 14 cm (4.9 to 5.5 in) long. Males weigh 22 to 29 g (0.78 to 1.0 oz) and females 20 to 28 g (0.71 to 0.99 oz). The sexes are alike. Their generally buffy face has a dark line through the eye and a pale buff-white supercilium, a pattern unique among New World members of Rallidae. Adults of the nominate subspecies L. f. flaviventer have brown upperparts and a white throat, buffy yellow breast, and black and white banded flanks and belly. The other subspecies differ from the nominate in size and the intensity of their colors. The nominate and L. f. gossii are the largest, and the nominate has the darkest neck and breast. L. f. bangsi's upperparts are the darkest and L. f. hendersoni's are the palest.

== Distribution and habitat ==
The five subspecies of yellow-breasted crake are found thus:

- L. f. gossii, Cuba and Jamaica
- L. f. hendersoni, Hispaniola and Puerto Rico
- L. f. woodi, from central Mexico south to northwestern Costa Rica
- L. f. bangsi, northern Colombia
- L. f. flaviventer, Panama east through northern and central Colombia and Venezuela to the Guianas and south through parts of Brazil, eastern Bolivia, Paraguay, and Uruguay into northeastern Argentina; also Trinidad and Tobago

Undocumented sight records in Ecuador lead the South American Classification Committee (SACC) of the AOS to call the species hypothetical in that country. The SACC also notes it as a vagrant rather than an inhabitant in Uruguay.

The yellow-breasted crake is primarily a bird of freshwater systems, but is also rarely found in saltwater. It inhabits marshes, grassy edges of ponds and lakes, rice fields, and flooded grassy fields. In elevation it ranges from sea level to 2,500 m (8,200 ft).

== Behavior ==
=== Movement ===
The yellow-breasted crake is usually considered sedentary, but movements have not been fully defined. At some locations in Colombia it is present only from March to July, and in Costa Rica it appears to make local movements as water levels change. In addition, the SACC has no records of breeding in French Guiana, which hints at some migration.

=== Feeding ===
The yellow-breasted crake forages among emergent plants, sometimes running across them or climbing among them. It leaves cover during dawn and dusk to feed at the water's edge. Its diet includes small gastropods, insects, and seeds.

=== Breeding ===
The yellow-breasted crake's breeding season(s) are not well defined but appear to vary geographically. It builds a loose nest among reeds or marsh grass. An average clutch is about four eggs. Nothing else is known about the species' breeding biology.

=== Vocalization ===
The yellow-breasted crake has at least three vocalizations, a "[l]ow, harsh, rolled or churring 'k'kuk kurr-kurr'", a "plaintive, squealing, single or repeated 'kreer' or 'krreh'", and a "high-pitched, whistled 'peep'."

== Status ==
The IUCN has assessed the yellow-breasted crake as being of Least Concern. Its estimated population of 7000 mature individuals has an unknown trend. No immediate threats have been identified. It is considered locally common in much of its range and is "undoubtedly more widespread than is known."
