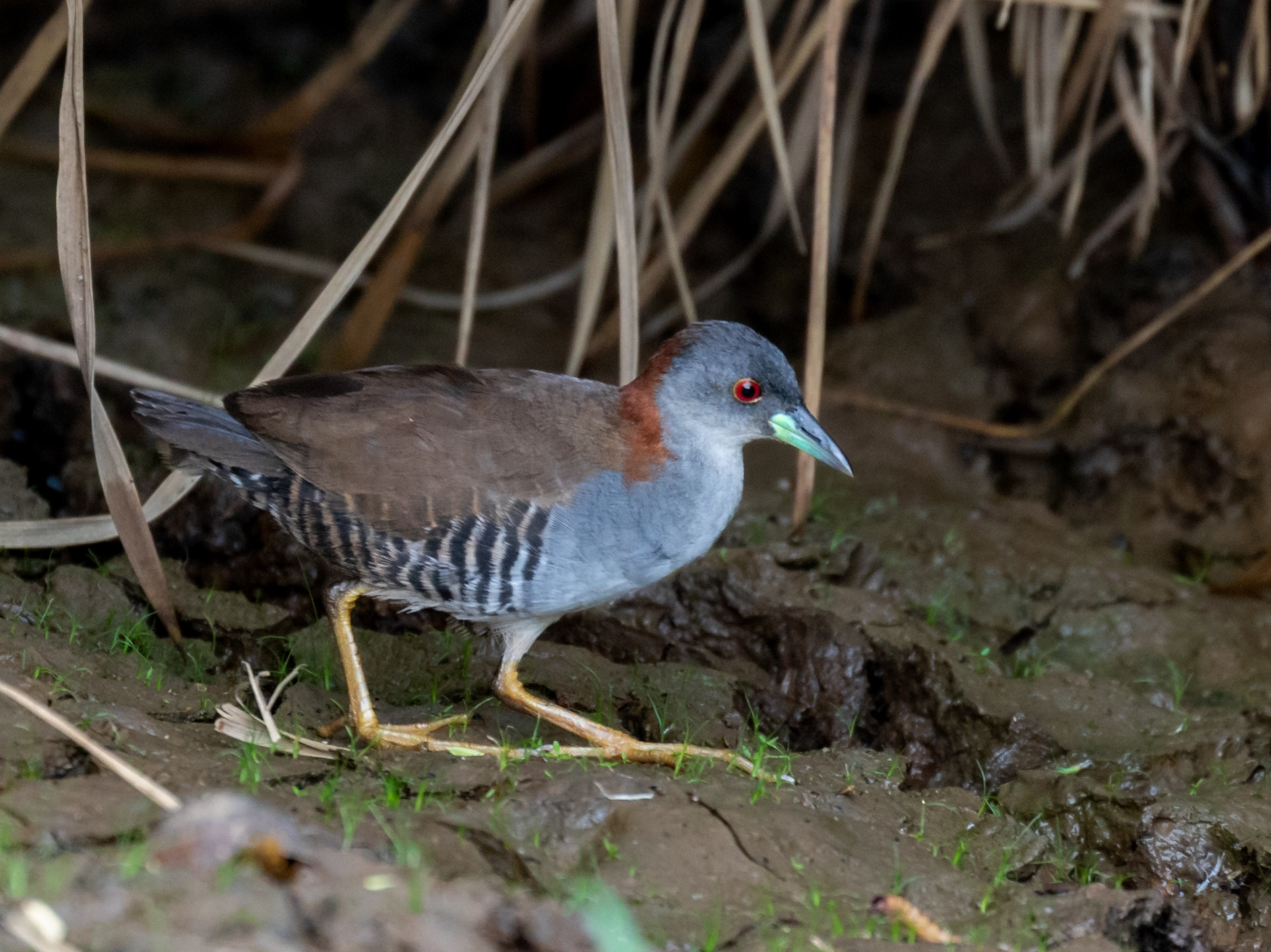

Conservation status
- Least Concern (IUCN 3.1)

Scientific classification
- Kingdom: Animalia
- Phylum: Chordata
- Class: Aves
- Order: Gruiformes
- Family: Rallidae
- Genus: Laterallus
- Species: L. exilis

Binomial name
- Laterallus exilis (Temminck, 1831)

= Grey-breasted crake =

Species of bird

The grey-breasted crake (Laterallus exilis) is a species of bird in subfamily Rallinae of family Rallidae, the rails, gallinules, and coots. It is found in Belize, Costa Rica, Guatemala, Honduras, Nicaragua, Panama, Trinidad and Tobago, and every mainland South American country except Chile and Uruguay.

== Taxonomy and systematics ==
The grey-breasted crake is monotypic, though the population along the Honduras-Nicaragua border was once proposed as a subspecies.

== Description ==
The grey-breasted crake is 14 to 15.5 cm (5.5 to 6.1 in) long. Males weigh 26.5 to 39 g (0.93 to 1.4 oz) and females 29 to 43 g (1.0 to 1.5 oz). The sexes are alike. Adults have a pale gray head and breast, a white throat, and a chesnut nape. The rest of their upperparts are olive brown and their flanks are heavily barred black and white.

== Distribution and habitat ==
The grey-breasted crake has several discreet ranges. One is from Belize and eastern Guatemala through Honduras, Nicaragua, Costa Rica, and Panama into Colombia and western Venezuela. Another is in central Venezuela and a third extends through the Guianas into Brazil. The largest encompasses most of Amazonian Brazil, Colombia, Ecuador, and Bolivia and extends south through Paraguay into northeastern Argentina. It is also found in northwestern Ecuador, in several enclaves along coastal southeastern Brazil, and on Trinidad.

The grey-breasted crake inhabits a variety of landscapes. Most have shallow standing water, such as the edges of marshes, rivers, and lakes and also wet meadows and rice fields. It also occurs in dry sites like pastures and airfields.

== Behavior ==
=== Movement ===
The grey-breasted crake is thought to be sedentary, but some local movements are suspected.

=== Feeding ===
The grey-breasted crake's foraging technique has not been described. Its diet is mostly insects of several orders and also includes spiders, worms, and seeds.

=== Breeding ===
The grey-breasted crake's breeding seasons are not well defined but appear to vary geographically. It makes a sperical nest of woven grass and weed stems with a side entrance. The typical clutch size is three eggs.

=== Vocalization ===
The grey-breasted crake has several vocalizations including "a series of 2–10 'tink' or 'keek' notes; also [a] descending musical rattle and [a] quiet, sharp 'check'."

== Status ==
The IUCN has assessed the grey-breasted crake as being of Least Concern. It has a very large range and an estimated population of at least 50,000 mature individuals. However, the population is believed to be decreasing. No immediate threats have been identified. It is deemed common in Amazonia but local and uncommon in Central America.
