= Speckle =

A speckle is a small spot or speck on the skin, plumage or foliage.

Speckle, speckles or speckled may also refer to:

== People ==
- Daniel Speckle (AKA Daniel Specklin, 1536–1589), Alsatian fortress architect, engineer, and cartographer

== Science and technology ==
- Dynamic speckle
- Speckle imaging
- Speckle masking
- Speckle pattern, also known as speckle noise
- Speckle tracking echocardiography
- Nuclear speckles, also known as Splicing speckles, also known as interchromatin granule clusters

== Fiction ==
- Speckles, a leopard toy character
- Speckle Frew, a fictional island in The Books of Abarat
- Speckles, Speckles Junior and Speckles' Mother, male and female Tarbosaurus in the 2012 film The Dino King and its 2017 sequel Dino King: Journey to Fire Mountain
- Speckle, a character from Tuca & Bertie
