= Peter Mundy =

British merchant trader, traveller and writer

Peter Mundy (1597-1667) was a seventeenth-century English factor, merchant trader, traveller and writer. He was the first Englishman to record, in his Itinerarium Mundi ('Itinerary of the World'), tasting Chaa (tea) in China and travelled extensively in Asia, Russia and Europe.

== Life ==
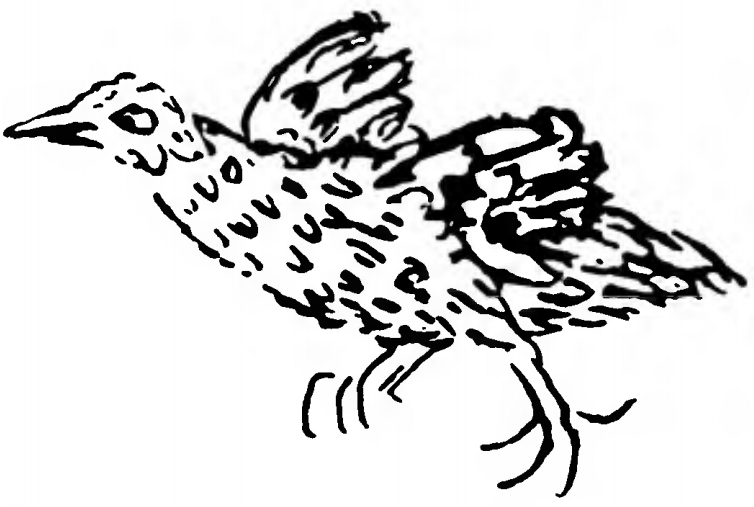
Mundy's drawing of the Ascension flightless crake, now extinct

Mundy came from Penryn in south Cornwall. In 1609 he accompanied his father, a pilchard trader to Rouen across the Channel in Normandy, and was then sent to Gascony to learn French. In May 1611 he went as a cabin-boy in a merchant ship, and gradually rose in life until he became of independent circumstances.

He visited Constantinople in 1617, returning to London and overland via Bulgaria, Sarajevo, Split, Venice, Chambéry and Paris with the English Ambassador Sir Paul Pindar, and afterwards made a journey to Spain as a clerk in the employ of Richard Wyche. Following Wyche's death and a brief spell in the family Pilchard business, he returned to London and obtained employment on account of his language skills, travelling experience and reference from Pindar, with the East India Company on a salary of 25 pounds.

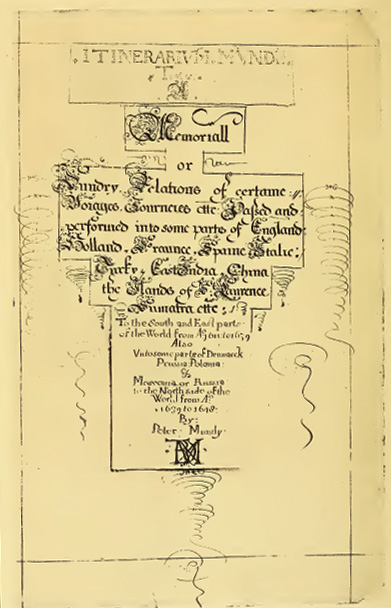
The title page of Mundy's Relations

As a fisherman and sailor it is likely that he spoke at least some Cornish of which he makes some account of its relation to Welsh, visiting Wales (and climbing Ysgyryd Fawr) in 1639 where he noted "few of the common or poorer sort understand any English at all".

He went on further voyages to India, China, and Japan, when he started from the Downs on 14 April 1636. His journals record his being served "Chaa" or tea by the Chinese and tasting chocolate aboard a Spanish merchant vessel. The fleet of four ships and two pinnaces were sent out by Sir William Courten, and Mundy seems to have been employed as a factor. His journals end somewhat abruptly, but a manuscript in the Rawlinson collection at the Bodleian Library continues the narrative of his life, spending many years living in the Hansa free city of Danzig - modern Gdańsk - including journeys to Denmark, Prussia, and Russia, which lasted from 1639 to 1648. Mundy himself made the drawings for the volume and traced his routes in red on the maps of Hondius. In 1663 he declared his travelling days over and retired to Falmouth. His journals record his own calculation of the distance he had travelled in his many voyages as 100,833 and 5/8th miles. His manuscripts were lost for nearly 300 years before being published by the Hakluyt Society (1905-36).

Philip Marsden's history of Falmouth, The Levelling Sea, published in 2011, provides a brief account of Peter Mundy's life on pages 131–137.

He also left the earliest description of the Musaeum Tradescantianum.

== Travels to India ==
Peter Mundy travelled from England to Surat, which he reached at September 1628. In 1630, it was agreed to transfer Peter Mundy to Agra. He began his journey on 11 November, reaching Agra on 3 January 1631. He served his superiors but then he was told to go to Patna to make an investment in cloth. On 6 August 1632, he set out for Patna, travelling 500 miles and reaching his destination on 20 September 1632. He did not make a good profit in Patna and decided to return to Agra in November. He reached Agra on 22 December and stayed there for two months, during which time he witnessed the marriage of Shah Jahan's two elder sons. He appears to have enjoyed visiting Fatehpur Sikri, which was deserted by Akbar.

== Character ==
"It is rare to find a man so representative of his period as was Peter Mundy. In an age when curiosity was the outstanding characteristic of intelligent Englishmen, curiosity was the ruling passion of this life. ... His insatiable appetite for information, his eye for detail, his desire for accuracy, would have made him in modern times a first-rate scientist. ... True to his period, also, was his heartlessness ... he was more interested in the appearances of things than their implications in the lives of human beings. ... But if he was unfeeling, he was by no means insensitive; each strange item in the surprising world he had inherited is described with a spontaneous brilliance seldom to be found in modern writing."

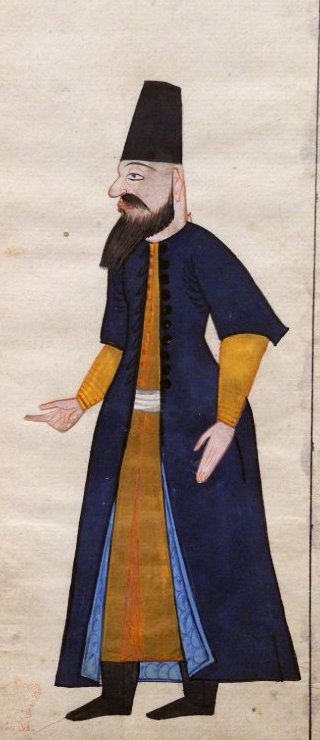
"Jew at Constantinople", "A briefe relation of the Turckes, their kings, Emperors, or Grandsigneurs, their conquests, religion, customes, habbits, etc" - Istanbul 1618

== Itinerary ==
- 1530s Grandfather was Chanoor or Chantor at Glasney College
- 1596 Born at Penryn, his father was Richard Mundy

Religious education with uncle in Devon

- 1608 first voyage to Rouen with his Father trading pilchards
- 1610 Bayonne, Gascony to learn 'the French Tongue'
- 1611 No further mention of his mother
- 1613 San Lucar with Mr Parker
- 1615 Seville with Mr Weaver, "attains" the Spanish Tongue
- 1617 Constantinople with James Wyche; returns overland via Belgrade; Sarajevo; Split; Venice; Padua; Verona; Milan; crosses the Alps to Lyons; Orleans; Paris; Calais; London
- 1620-21 Returns overland to Penryn
- 1621 Seville for ‘the Copper Contract’; apparently a Falmouth-based family venture with sparse details recorded initially.
- 1625 Valladolid
- 1626 St Malo and Jersey – apparently an excursion for pleasure
- 1628 Applies to the East India Company to Surat, India on £25 salary
- 1635-38 India to Japan
- 1637 June to December in Macao
- 1639 ‘Petty Progress’ in England & Wales
- 1640-1647 Amsterdam and Holland, Prussia, Warsaw and Poland, Russia – based from the free city of Dantzigk / Gdansk
- 1647 Returns to Falmouth
- 1650-54 Begins writing in earnest in London
- 1655-56 3rd Voyage to India on the Alleppo Merchant
- 1658 Stays in London
- 1663-67 Returns to complete memoires in Penryn.
