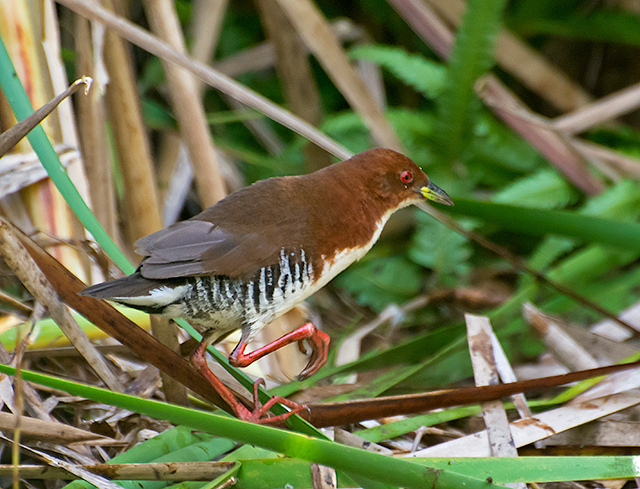
- Rufous-sided crake (Laterallus melanophalus)

Scientific classification
- Kingdom: Animalia
- Phylum: Chordata
- Class: Aves
- Order: Gruiformes
- Family: Rallidae
- Genus: Laterallus; Gray, G.R., 1855

Type species
- Rallus melanophaius Vieillot, 1819

Species
- see text

= Laterallus =

Genus of birds

Laterallus is a genus of birds in the rail family Rallidae. These small, relatively short-billed terrestrial rails are found among dense vegetation near water in the Neotropics, although a single species, the black rail, also occurs in the United States.

== Taxonomy ==
The genus was erected by the English zoologist George Robert Gray in 1855 with the rufous-sided crake (Laterallus melanophaius) as the type species. The genus name is a portmanteau of Rallus lateralis, a synonym of the binomial name for the rufous-sided crake. The authors of a molecular genetic study published in 2019 proposed that the yellow-breasted crake, the dot-winged crake, and the flightless Inaccessible Island rail should be moved to this genus. Additional changes to the content of the genus were made based on the molecular phylogenetic study by Emiliano Depino and collaborators that was published in 2023.

== Species ==
The genus contains 11 species:

Image	Scientific name	Common name	Distribution
	Laterallus notatus	Speckled rail	
	Laterallus spiloptera	Dot-winged crake	
	Laterallus rogersi	Inaccessible Island rail	Inaccessible Island
	Laterallus jamaicensis	Black rail	
	Laterallus spilonota	Galapagos crake	
	Laterallus flaviventer	Yellow-breasted crake	
	Laterallus exilis	Grey-breasted crake	
	Laterallus albigularis	White-throated crake	
	Laterallus ruber	Ruddy crake	
	Laterallus levraudi	Rusty-flanked crake	
	Laterallus melanophalus	Rufous-sided crake	

The rufous-faced crake (Rufirallus xenopterus), red-and-white crake (Rufirallus leucopyrrhus) and the black-banded crake (Rufirallus fasciatus) were formerly placed in this genus.
