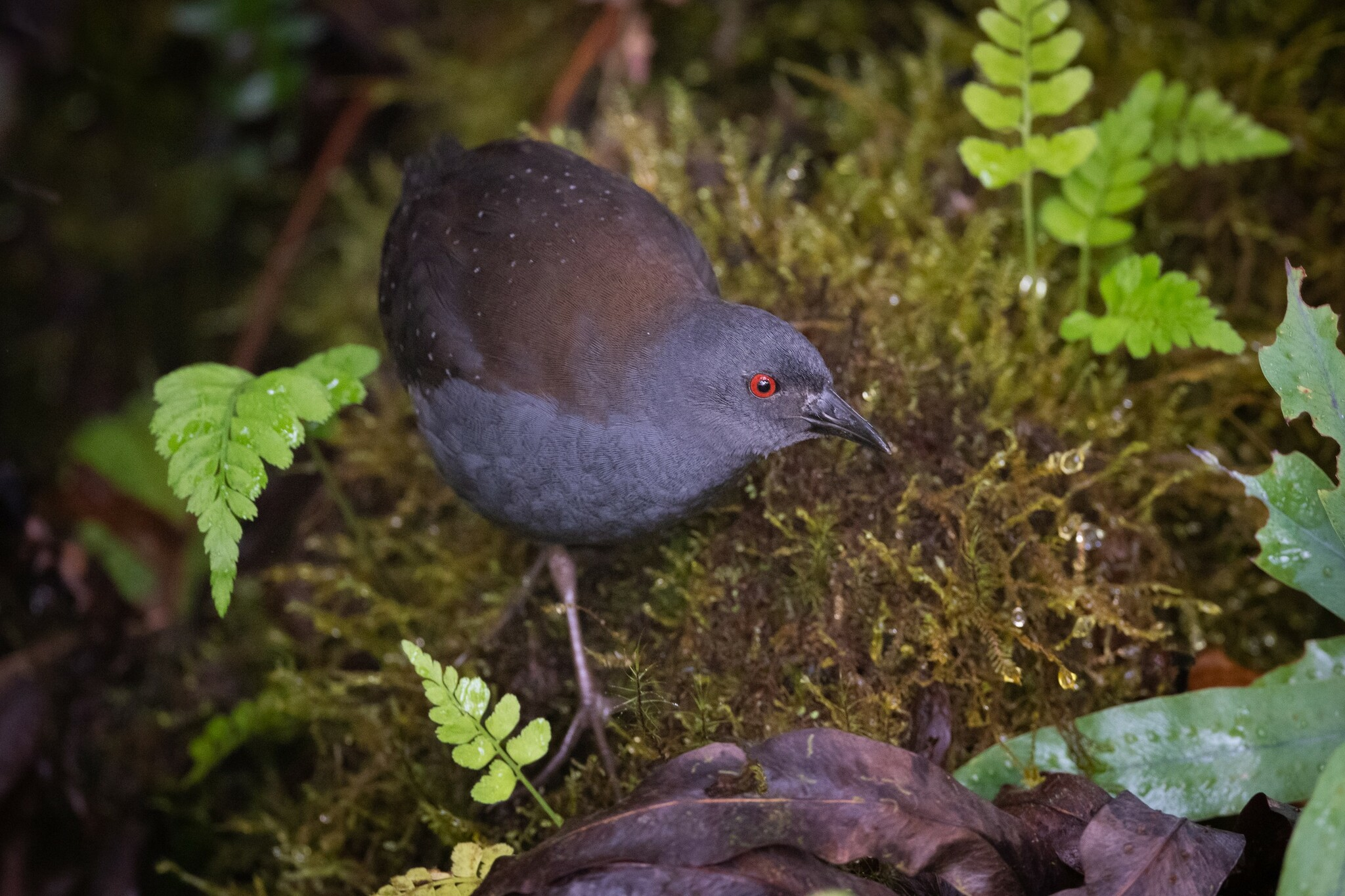

Conservation status
- Vulnerable (IUCN 3.1)

Scientific classification
- Kingdom: Animalia
- Phylum: Chordata
- Class: Aves
- Order: Gruiformes
- Family: Rallidae
- Genus: Laterallus
- Species: L. spilonota

Binomial name
- Laterallus spilonota (Gould, 1841)

Synonyms
- Laterallus spilonotus

= Galapagos crake =

Galápagos crake

Species of bird

The Galapagos crake (Laterallus spilonota), also called the Galapagos rail and Darwin's rail, is a vulnerable species of rail in subfamily Rallinae of family Rallidae, the rails, gallinules, and coots. It is endemic to the Galápagos Islands. It resembles its sister species, the black rail of the Americas, from which it diverged 1.2 million years ago.

== Taxonomy and systematics ==
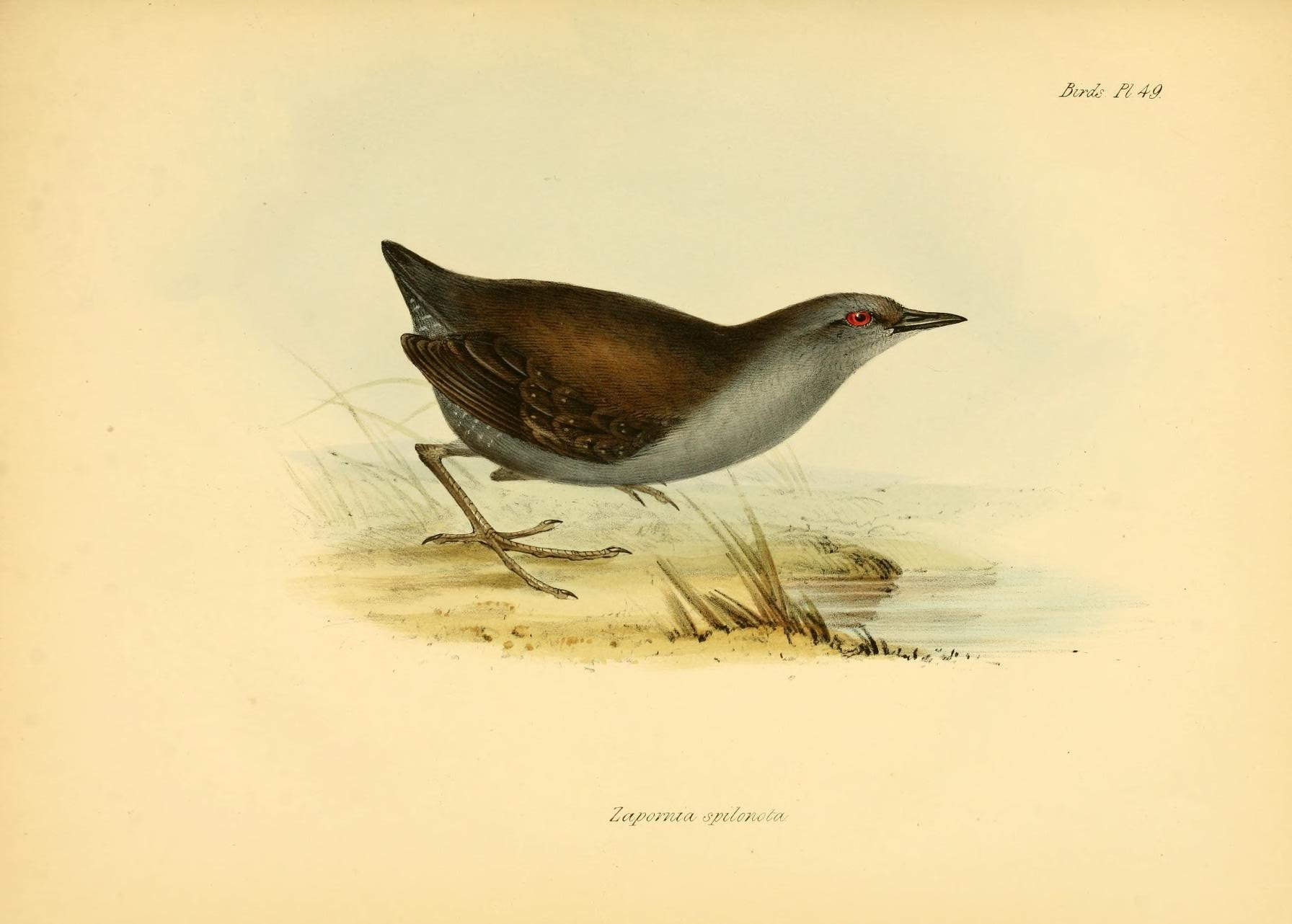
Illustration of L. spilonota.

The Galapagos crake was originally described as Zapornia spilonota and has been moved among at least five other scientific names before its current binomial was adopted. At least one author classified it as a subspecies of black rail, and others consider the black rail and Galapagos crake to form a superspecies.

The Galapagos crake is monotypic.

== Description ==
The Galapagos crake is about 15 cm (5.9 in) long and weighs about 35 to 45 g (1.2 to 1.6 oz). The sexes are alike. Adults have a dark gray crown and medium gray head and underparts. Their flanks and thighs have sparse narrow whitish bars. Their interscapulars, scapulars, and upper back are chestnut brown and the lower back, rump, uppertail coverts, and tail are dark brown. Their upper wing coverts also are brown, and may have fine white spots, and their flight feathers are light brown. Their iris is a distinctive red, and the bill, tarsi, and toes are dark brown. Juveniles have a mostly dark brown body with a lighter brown upper back; black lower back, rump, and tail; and slightly grayish face and throat. Their wings are an almost-black brown.

== Distribution and habitat ==
The Galapagos crake is found on the Galápagos islands of Pinta, Fernandina, Isabela, Santiago, Santa Cruz, Floreana, and San Cristóbal, though the population on San Cristóbal might be extinct. It was believed to be extinct on Floreana until it was rediscovered in 2025, after last being recorded by Charles Darwin in 1835. It is not known whether this indicates a population that survived undetected or more recent recolonisation.

It inhabits humid highlands on those islands in areas with dense fern, shrub, and forb cover.

== Behavior ==
=== Movement ===
The Galapagos crake is a year-round resident. It can fly and swim, though it does not fly well nor for long distances. Its flight has been described as awkward and labored. It tends to run rather than fly to escape danger.

=== Feeding ===
The Galapagos crake forages during the day, moving along the ground in dense growth tossing leaves and investigating the leaf litter. Its primary prey is insects of many types and its diet includes other arthropods, snails, and berries and seeds.

=== Breeding ===
The Galapagos crake's breeding season has not been fully defined but appears to span from September to April. It is aggressively territorial; it stamps its feet and raises its tail as a threat and may run towards other rails that encroach on its territory. Pairs are monogamous during the breeding season but it is not known if the bond lasts year-round. The species makes its nest on the ground; it is a partially covered cup made of herbaceous plant matter with a side entrance. The clutch size is three to six eggs. The incubation period is 23 to 25 days and both parents incubate. Chicks take about 80 to 85 days from hatch to reach adulthood.

=== Vocalization ===
The Galapagos crake gives at least five vocalizations, "cheeping, a chichichichiroo call, a chirr call, a chatter call, and a rattle call". They variously are used for members of a family to maintain contact, to advertise territory, and to intimidate predators.

== Status ==
The IUCN originally assessed the Galapagos crake as Near Threatened but since 2000 has classified it as Vulnerable. It has a very limited range and its estimated population of between 3300 and 6700 mature individuals is believed to be decreasing. Destruction of habitat by cattle, goats, and pigs is a major cause of population decline; when those were removed from Santiago Island the crake population rebounded. Climate change and its associated severe weather events may affect the crake's habitat. Feral rats, cats, and dogs, and native short-eared owls (Asio flammeus) are potential threats as well.
