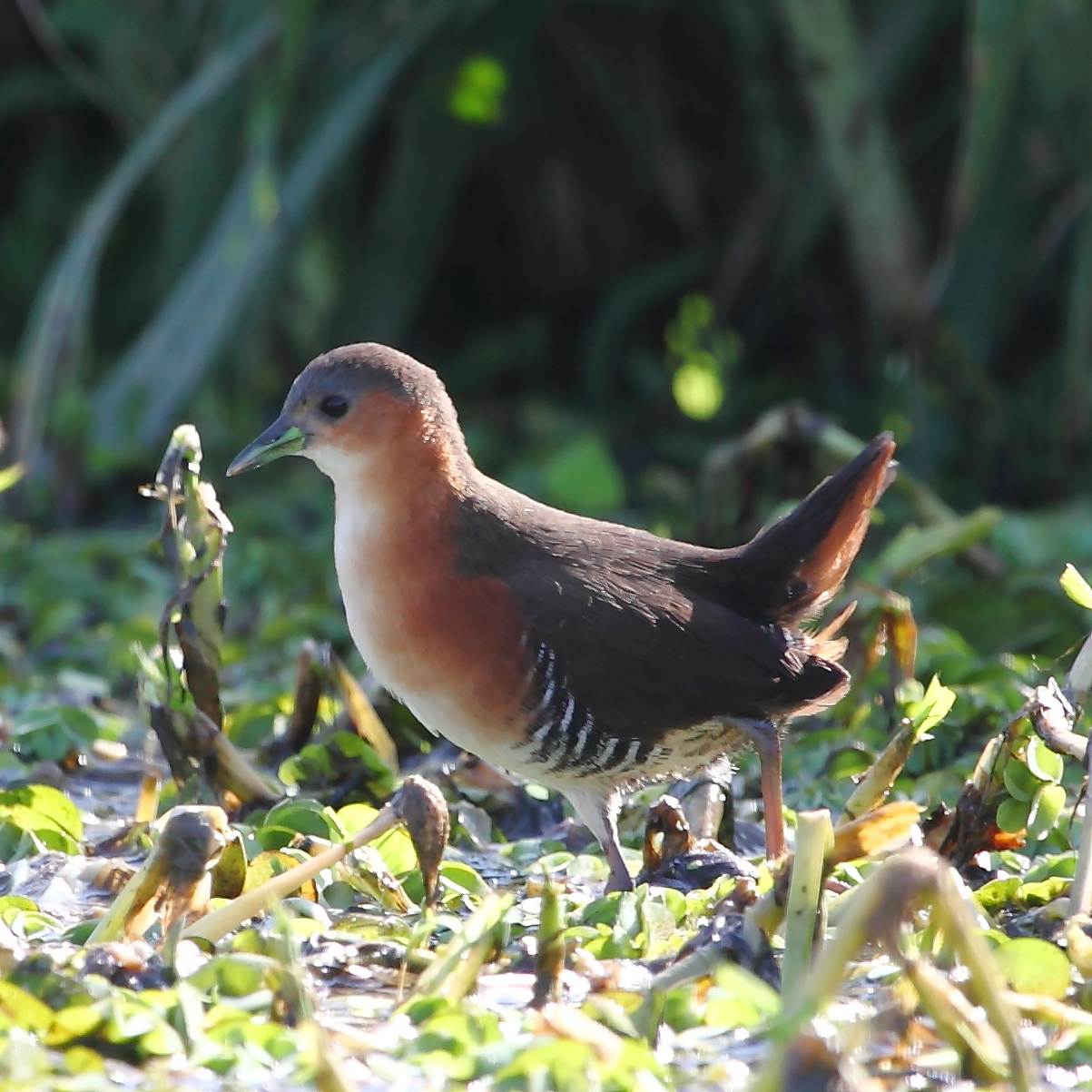

Conservation status
- Least Concern (IUCN 3.1)

Scientific classification
- Kingdom: Animalia
- Phylum: Chordata
- Class: Aves
- Order: Gruiformes
- Family: Rallidae
- Genus: Laterallus
- Species: L. melanophaius

Binomial name
- Laterallus melanophaius (Vieillot, 1819)

= Rufous-sided crake =

Species of bird

The rufous-sided crake (Laterallus melanophaius) is a species of bird in subfamily Rallinae of family Rallidae, the rails, gallinules, and coots. It is found in every mainland South American country except Chile.

== Taxonomy and systematics ==
The rufous-sided crake has two subspecies, the nominate L. m. melanophaius and L. m. oenops. What is now the white-throated crake (L. albigularis) was for a time treated as a third subspecies.

== Description ==
The rufous-sided crake is 14 to 18 cm (5.5 to 7.1 in) long and weighs about 50 to 60 g (1.8 to 2.1 oz). The sexes are alike. Both subspecies' bills have a gray maxilla with a pea green cutting edge and a pale pea green mandible with a white tip. Their legs and feet are light gray brown to olive brown. The nominate subspecies has dark olive brown upperparts with a gray tinge around the eye. The face and sides of the breast are rufous to cinnamon rufous. The throat and center of the breast are white, the flanks and belly barred white and blackish brown, and the undertail coverts are dark cinnamon rufous. Subspecies L. m. oenops is similar to the nominate, but has paler upperparts and is rufous on the forecrown and around the eye.

== Distribution and habitat ==
The nominate subspecies of rufous-sided crake has much the larger range of the two. It is found from coastal Venezuela east through the Guianas and separately from central and eastern Brazil south through eastern Bolivia, Paraguay, and Uruguay into northern Argentina. Subspecies L. m. oenops is found from southern Colombia south through eastern Ecuador into eastern Peru and east into western Brazil. The species primarily inhabits freshwater marshes and similar landscapes such as flooded pastures and the edges of ponds and oxbow lakes .

== Behavior ==
=== Movement ===
The rufous-sided crake is not known to migrate.

=== Feeding ===
The rufous-sided crake usually forages in dense grassy vegetation but also in the open close to cover. It forages in mud and vegetation for its primary diet of small arthropods; seeds and leaves are also eaten.

=== Breeding ===
Only fragments are known about the rufous-sided crake's breeding biology. Its nesting season(s) are not known for most of its range but include September and October in Argentina. Its nest is a globe of leaves lined with leaf shreds, dry grass, and feathers. It is placed on or just above the ground and has a side entrance. The incubation period is about 20 days.

=== Vocalization ===
The rufous-sided crake's song is "a rubbery musical trill" much like those of other Laterallus crakes. Its calls include ""high-pitched tinkling calls[,] [a] short treeeeeng[, and] a harsh, descending djreer."

== Status ==
The IUCN has assessed the rufous-sided crake as being of Least Concern. It has a very large range but its population size and trend are not known. No immediate threats have been identified. It is thought uncommon to locally common in Ecuador and fairly common in Peru. "Human activity has little short-term direct effect on Rufous-sided Crake, other than the local effects of habitat destruction."
