= Isabelline =

Isabelline may refer to:

- Isabelline style, or Isabelline, a late medieval architectural style developed under the reign of Isabella I of Castile
- Isabelline (colour), a pale grey-yellowish or parchment colour—an off-white colour often used to describe animals
- Isabelline bush-hen (Amaurornis isabellina), also isabelline waterhen, a large rail
- Isabelline shrike (Lanius isabellinus), member of the shrike family (Laniidae)
- Isabelline wheatear (Oenanthe isabellina), small passerine bird
- Parties and factions in Isabelline Spain
