= Bush hen =

Bush hen is a name used for a number of bird species:

- Plain bush-hen (Amaurornis olivacea)
- Isabelline bush-hen (Amaurornis isabellina)
- Talaud bush-hen (Amaurornis magnirostris)
- Weka, (Gallirallus australis) a flightless bird endemic to New Zealand
