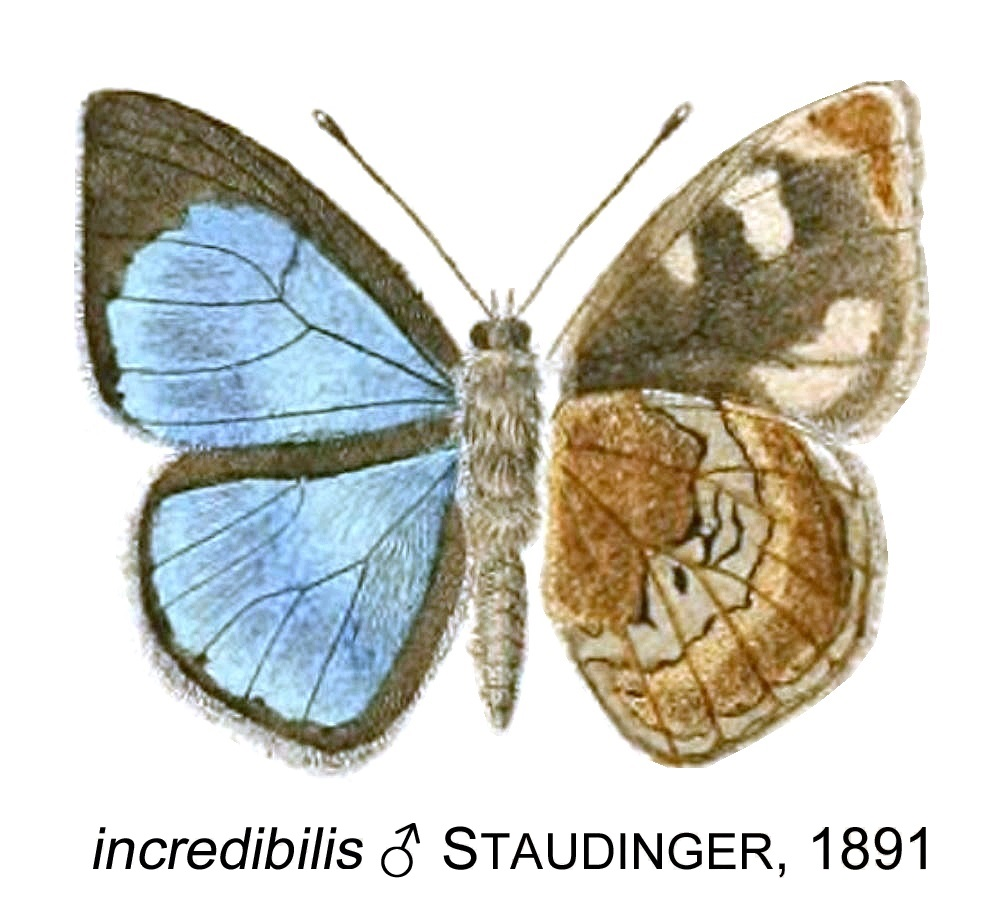

Scientific classification
- Kingdom: Animalia
- Phylum: Arthropoda
- Clade: Pancrustacea
- Class: Insecta
- Order: Lepidoptera
- Family: Lycaenidae
- Genus: Iridana
- Species: I. incredibilis

Binomial name
- Iridana incredibilis (Staudinger, 1891)

Synonyms
- Iris incredibilis Staudinger, 1891; Iris ansorgei Grose-Smith, 1898

= Iridana incredibilis =

Species of butterfly

Iridana incredibilis, the incredible sapphire gem, is a butterfly in the family Lycaenidae. It is found in Sierra Leone, Liberia, Ivory Coast, Ghana, southern Nigeria, Cameroon, the Democratic Republic of the Congo and Uganda. The habitat consists of forests.

Adults are on wing in September, November and January.

== Description in Seitz ==
In the male the greenish-blue, strongly reflecting colour of the forewing above covers the areas 1 a, 1 b and the discal cell, the greatest part of the areas 2 and 3 and about half of the areas 4 and 5, as well as the whole hindwing except the costal, proximal and distal margins which are black in 1 to 2 mm width. In the female the forewing is above black and only in the basal part of the areas 1 b to 3 broadly blue; on the hindwing the margins are 3 mm broad black. The under surface of the forewing is dull black with three light, Isabel-coloured spots in the discal cell, behind the latter and in the anal angle, with a grey costal margin and a light apical part intensely speckled brown, semicircularly bordered with greenish quite at the apex; posteriorly the narrow greenish semicircle is continued as a narrow, violet distal-marginal stripe. Very peculiar is the under surface of the hindwing showing a light brownish-greyground-colour very densely speckled with dark, in the distal part with dark brown; through the middle runs a rather broad, grey transverse band with a dull silvery lustre in a certain light, more or less bordered with black at its margins and showing in the middle a reniform macula surrounded by black; all these black margins are more or less bordered with a brownish red; immediately in front of the margin there is a very narrow, linear transverse band with a dull silvery grey lustre, proximally bordered with black, outside before the silvery grey fringes very finely with red-brown.
