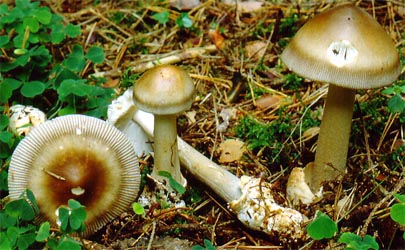

Scientific classification
- Domain: Eukaryota
- Kingdom: Fungi
- Division: Basidiomycota
- Class: Agaricomycetes
- Order: Agaricales
- Family: Amanitaceae
- Genus: Amanita
- Species: A. umbrinolutea

Binomial name
- Amanita umbrinolutea (Secr. ex Gillet) Bataille

= Amanita umbrinolutea =

Species of fungus

Amanita umbrinolutea Mycological characteristics
- Gills on hymenium
- Cap is umbonate
- Hymenium is free
- Stipe has a volva
- Spore print is white
- Ecology is mycorrhizal
- Edibility is unknown

Amanita umbrinolutea, also known as the umber-zoned ringless amanita, is a species of the genus Amanita.

== Description ==
The cap of A. umbrinolutea is usually free of volval remnants, 4.5–9 centimetres (2–3 1/2 inches) wide, at first conico-paraboloid, then somewhat campanulate to convex and finally planar, umbonate, with a strongly striate margin (occupying around 25–35% of the cap's radius). The cap is often dark in the center, then pale, then dark over the inner edges of the lamellae and on the ridges between the marginal striations; it can at other times be pallid in the center, but strongly zonate; the pigmentation intensity varies, with the center ranging from umber to grayish umber-brown to beige or pale grayish brown. The gills are free, crowded, off-white to sordid pale cream in mass, and up to 6 millimetres (1/4 in) broad; the short gills are truncate, vary in length, and are scattered and unevenly distributed.

The stem is 11.5–18.5 cm (4 1/2–7 1/2 in) × 6–11 mm, pale cream to pale beige or isabella color or pale grayish brown, with a faint appressed zigzag girdles of fibrils, with a fleshy membranous sack-like volva at the base. The 3–4 cm (1–1 1/2 in) high volva is attached to the bottom 5 mm or so of the stipe. The spores measure 10.5–13.4 × 9.5–12.5 (1.05–1.34 x 0.95–1.25 cm) μm and are subglobose (infrequently either globose or broadly ellipsoid) and inamyloid. Clamps are absent from the bases of basidia.

== Distribution and habitat ==
A. umbrinolutea is widely distributed in Europe, with its range extending eastward at least to around northwestern Pakistan and North India. Known specimens have examined have all been found in association with conifers (including pine and spruce).

== See also ==
- List of Amanita species
