= Iridana katera =

Scientific classification
- Kingdom: Animalia
- Phylum: Arthropoda
- Class: Insecta
- Order: Lepidoptera
- Family: Lycaenidae
- Genus: Iridana
- Species: I. katera

Binomial name
- Iridana katera Stempffer, 1964

Species of butterfly

Iridana katera is a butterfly in the family Lycaenidae. It is found in Uganda (the western shores of Lake Victoria and the Bwamba Valley) and north-western Tanzania. The habitat consists of forests.
