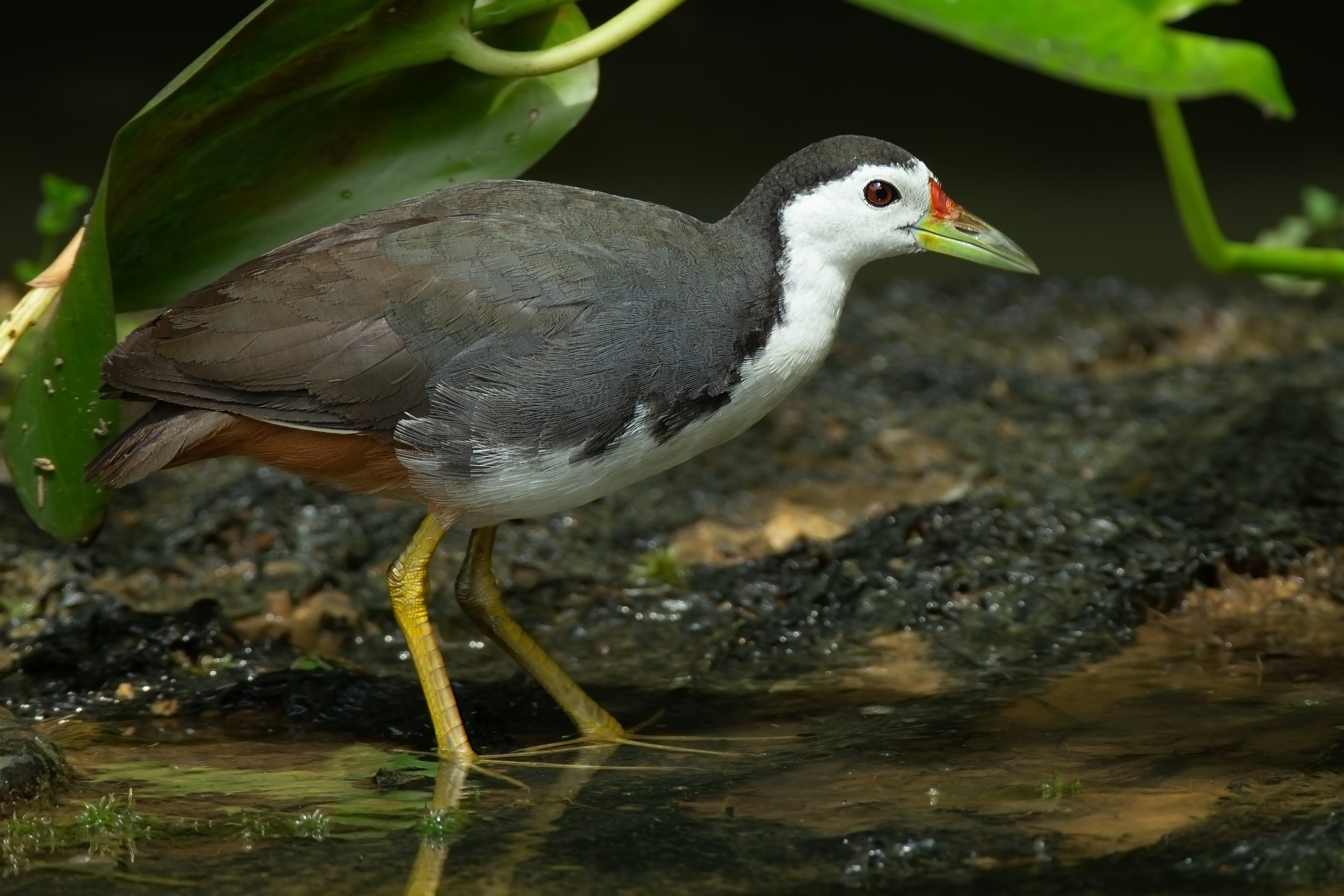
- Adult in Singapore

Conservation status
- Least Concern (IUCN 3.1)

Scientific classification
- Kingdom: Animalia
- Phylum: Chordata
- Class: Aves
- Order: Gruiformes
- Family: Rallidae
- Genus: Amaurornis
- Species: A. phoenicurus

Binomial name
- Amaurornis phoenicurus (Pennant, 1769)
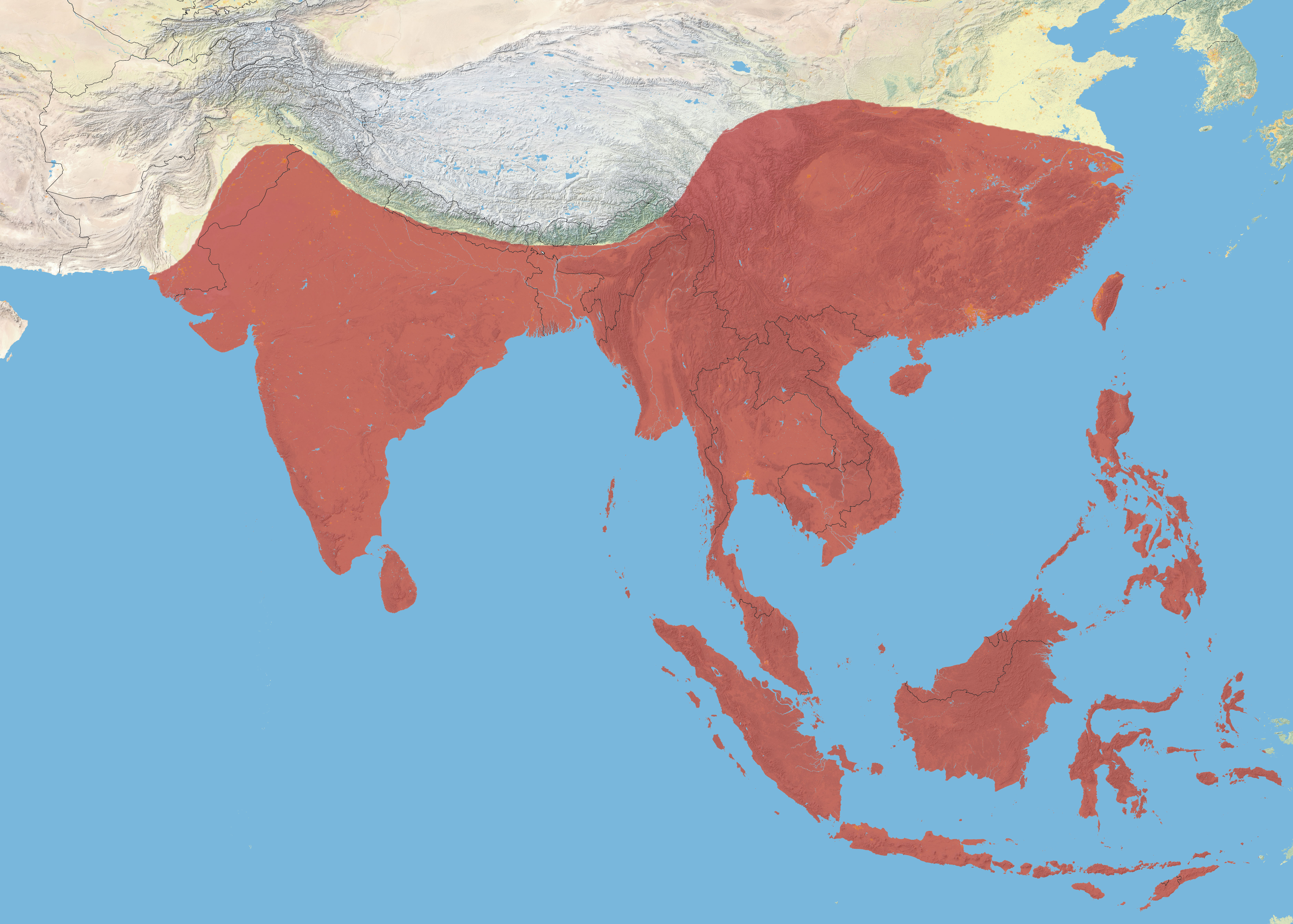
- approximate range

Synonyms
- Erythra phoenicura

Audio
- Call at dusk, Bangalore

= White-breasted waterhen =

Species of bird

The white-breasted waterhen (Amaurornis phoenicurus) is a waterbird of the rail and crake family, Rallidae, that is widely distributed across South and Southeast Asia. They are dark slaty birds with a clean white face, breast and belly. They are somewhat bolder than most other rails and are often seen stepping slowly with their tail cocked upright in open marshes or even drains near busy roads. They are largely crepuscular in activity and during the breeding season, just after the first rains, make loud and repetitive croaking calls.

== Description ==
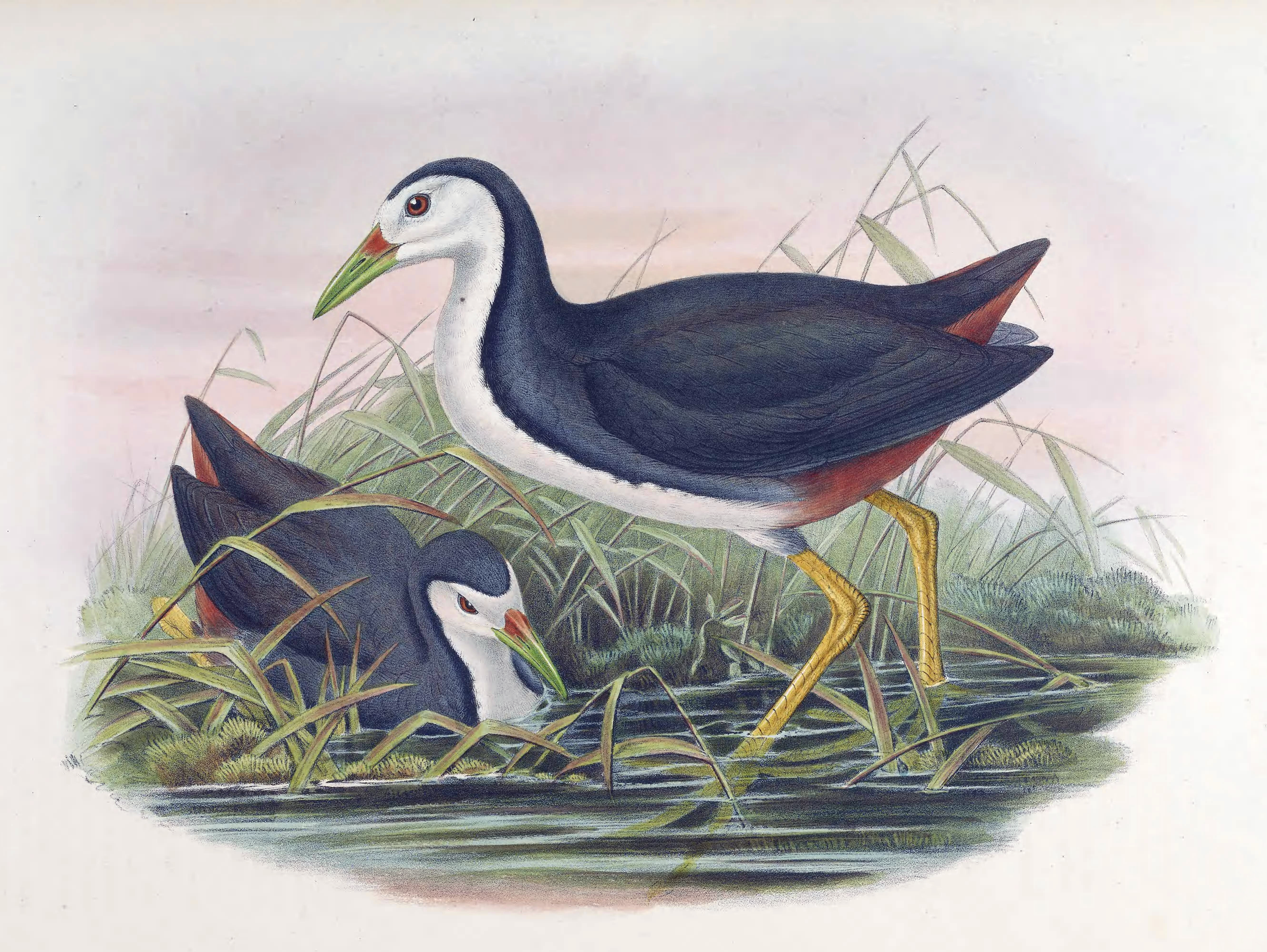
Amaurornis phoenicurus

Adult white-breasted waterhens have mainly dark grey upperparts and flanks, and a white face, neck and breast. The lower belly and undertail are cinnamon or white coloured. The body is flattened laterally to allow easier passage through the reeds or undergrowth. They have long toes, a short tail and a yellow bill and legs. Sexes are similar but females measure slightly smaller. Immature birds are much duller versions of the adults. The downy chicks are black, as with all rails.

Several subspecies are named for the populations that are widely distributed. The nominate subspecies is described from Sri Lanka but is often widened to include chinensis of mainland India and adjoining regions in Asia, west to Arabia and east nearly to Japan. The remaining subspecies are those from islands and include insularis of the Andaman and Nicobar Islands, midnicobaricus of the central Nicobars, leucocephala of Car Nicobar, maldivus of the Maldives, javanicus of Java and leucomelanus of Sulawesi and the Lesser Sundas.

== Distribution and habitat ==
Their breeding habitat is marshes across tropical Asia from Pakistan east to Indonesia. They are mainly seen in the plains but have been known from the higher hills such as in Nainital (1300m) and the High Range (1500m) in Kerala. These large 32 cm (13 in) long rails are permanent residents throughout their range. They make short distance movements and are known to colonize new areas. They have been noted as some of the early colonizers on the volcanic island of Rakata. Although most often found near freshwater, they are also found near brackish water and even the seashore when there is no freshwater as on the volcanic Barren Island in the Andamans.

== Behaviour and ecology ==
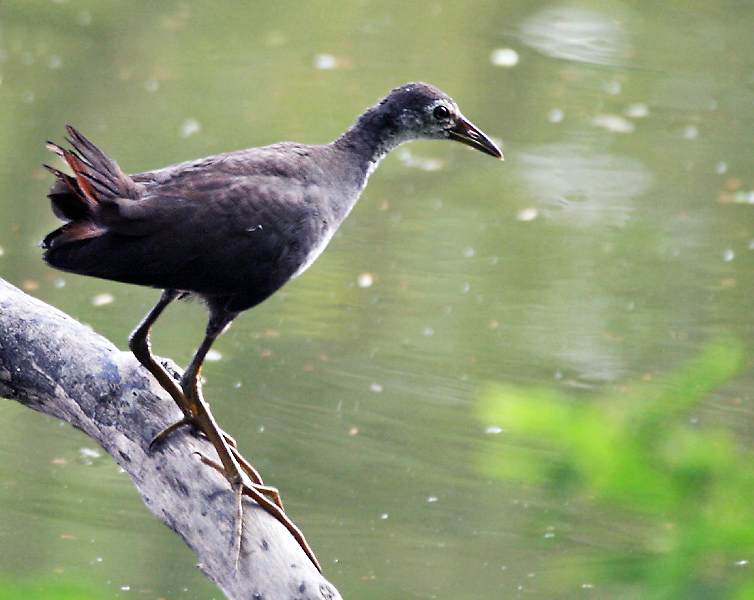
Immatures have only traces of white on the front

These birds are usually seen singly or in pairs as they forage slowly along the edge of a waterbody mainly on the ground but sometimes clambering up low vegetation. The tail is held up and jerked as they walk. They probe with their bill in mud or shallow water, also picking up food by sight. They mainly eat insects (large numbers of beetles have been recorded), small fish (which are often carefully washed in water), aquatic invertebrates and grains or seeds such as those of Pithecolobium dulce. They may sometimes feed in deeper water in the manner of a moorhen.

The nesting season is mainly June to October but varies locally. They nest in a dry location on the ground in marsh vegetation, laying 6-7 eggs. Courtship involves bowing, billing and nibbling. The eggs hatch in about 19 days. Both sexes incubate the eggs and take care of the chicks. Chicks often dive underwater to escape predation. Adults are said to build a roost or brood nest where young chicks and the adults roost.

Singapore, Oct 1994

Many rails are very secretive, but white-breasted waterhens are often seen out in the open. They can be noisy especially at dawn and dusk, with loud croaky calls. The Andamans population insularis is said to make duck like quack calls.

== In culture ==
Local names of this bird are often formed by onomatopoeia (based on the sound it makes), for example ruak-ruak in Malay and korawakka (කොරවක්කා) in Sinhala.; although differently formed local names are also not uncommon, such as "Dahuk" in Bengali (used in Bangladesh and the Bengali-speaking areas of India), "Dauk" (ডাউক) in Assamese, "Gur-gu-aa" in Boro, "Vo-kurwak" in Karbi, and "Keruwak" in Iban and Sarawakian Malay. In Odisha it is called as ଡାହୁକ "Daahuka" in Odia. In Maharashtra it is called as पाणकोंबडी pankombadi or कुवाक कोंबडी kuak kombadi in Marathi. In Malayalam they are called കുളക്കോഴി kulakozhi. They are called "Kanbili" in the Maldives. In Kannada they are called 'hundukoli' (ಹುಂಡುಕೋಳಿ). In Tamil, they are called கானாங்கோழி kaanaangkozi.

In Cebuano, it is known as tikúgas, it has cognates in several related languages in Taiwan which refer to the Taiwan bamboo partridge (e.g. tikolac in Amis).

The naturalist writer Eha humorously describes the call of this species: "It began with loud harsh roars which might have been elicited from a bear by roasting it slowly over a large fire, then suddenly changed to a clear note repeated like the coo of a dove."

== Gallery ==
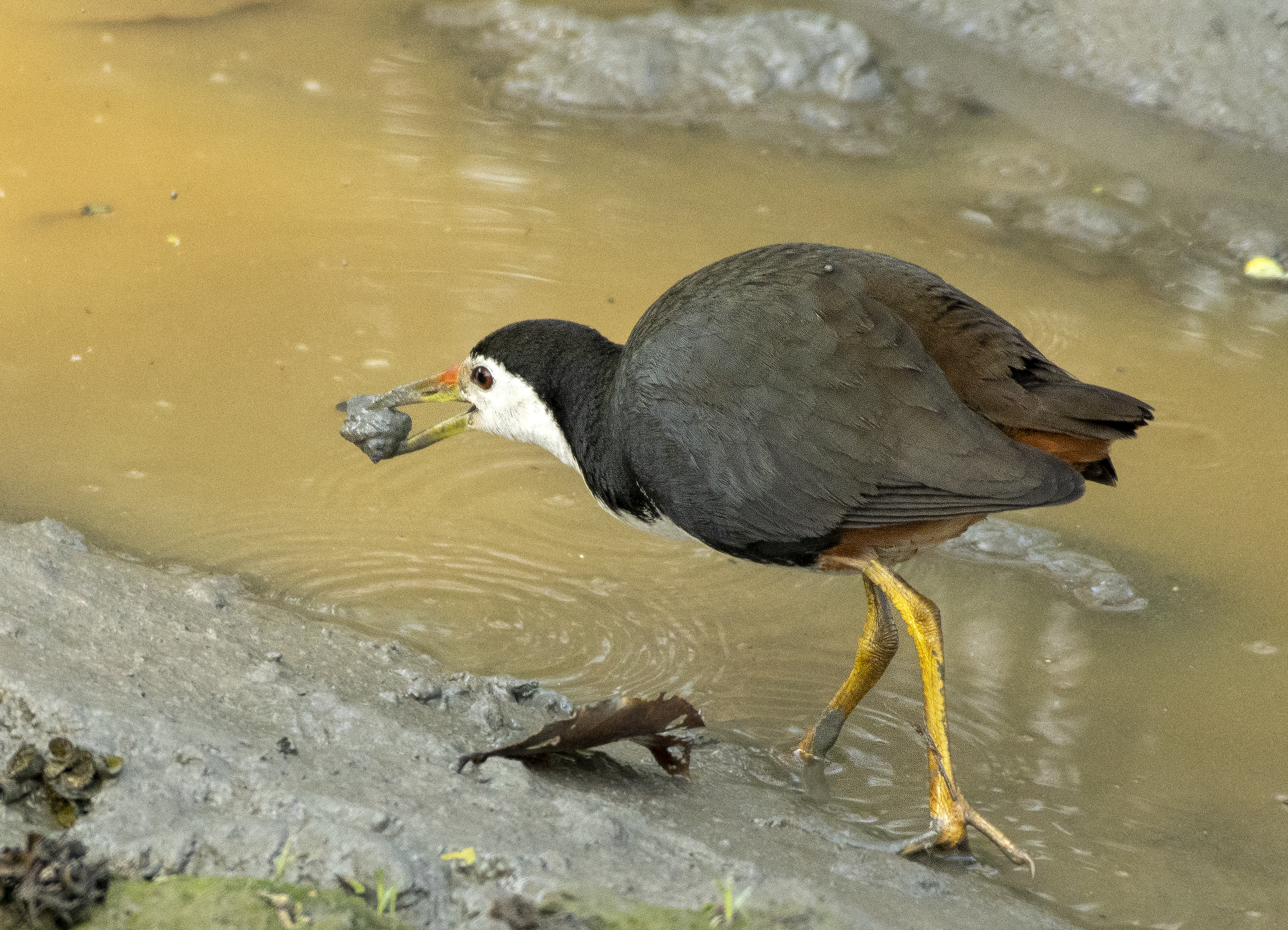
White-breasted Waterhen carrying a mollusc, Kaziranga National Park, Assam, India

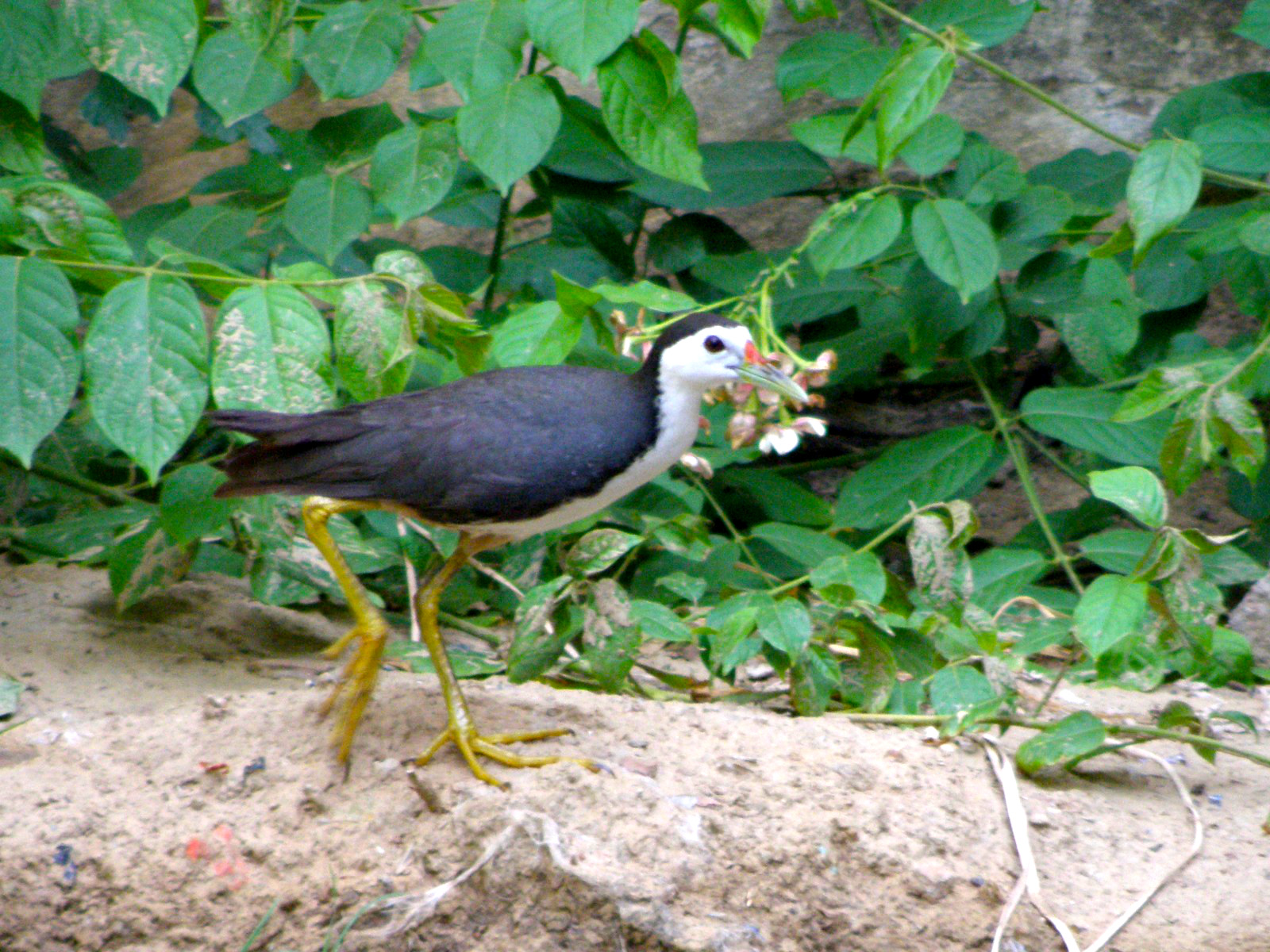
A White Breasted Waterhen scouting for insects in a small garden pond in Agra, Uttar pradesh, India
