= Iridana obscura =

Scientific classification
- Domain: Eukaryota
- Kingdom: Animalia
- Phylum: Arthropoda
- Class: Insecta
- Order: Lepidoptera
- Family: Lycaenidae
- Genus: Iridana
- Species: I. obscura

Binomial name
- Iridana obscura Stempffer, 1964

Species of butterfly

Iridana obscura is a butterfly in the family Lycaenidae. It is found in Uganda (from the western part of the country to the Toro sub-region).
