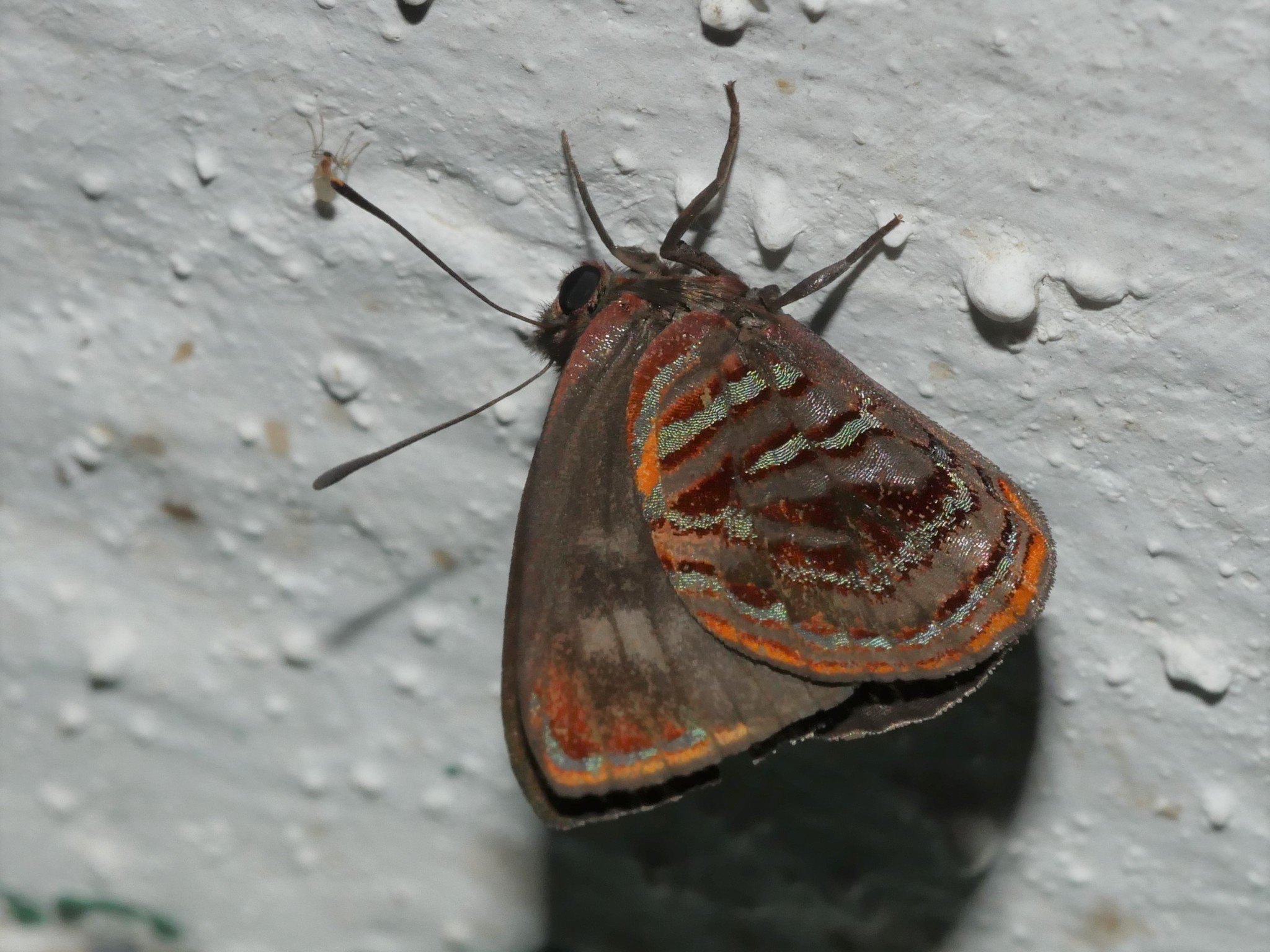

Scientific classification
- Kingdom: Animalia
- Phylum: Arthropoda
- Clade: Pancrustacea
- Class: Insecta
- Order: Lepidoptera
- Family: Lycaenidae
- Genus: Iridana
- Species: I. hypocala

Binomial name
- Iridana hypocala Eltringham, 1929

Synonyms
- Iridana magnifica Hawker-Smith, 1933

= Iridana hypocala =

Species of butterfly

Iridana hypocala, commonly known as Eltringham's sapphire gem, is a species of butterfly in the family Lycaenidae. It is found in Ghana (the Volta Region), Cameroon, the Democratic Republic of the Congo (Shaba), Uganda and north-western Tanzania. The habitat consists of forests.

Adults are most common in October and November.
