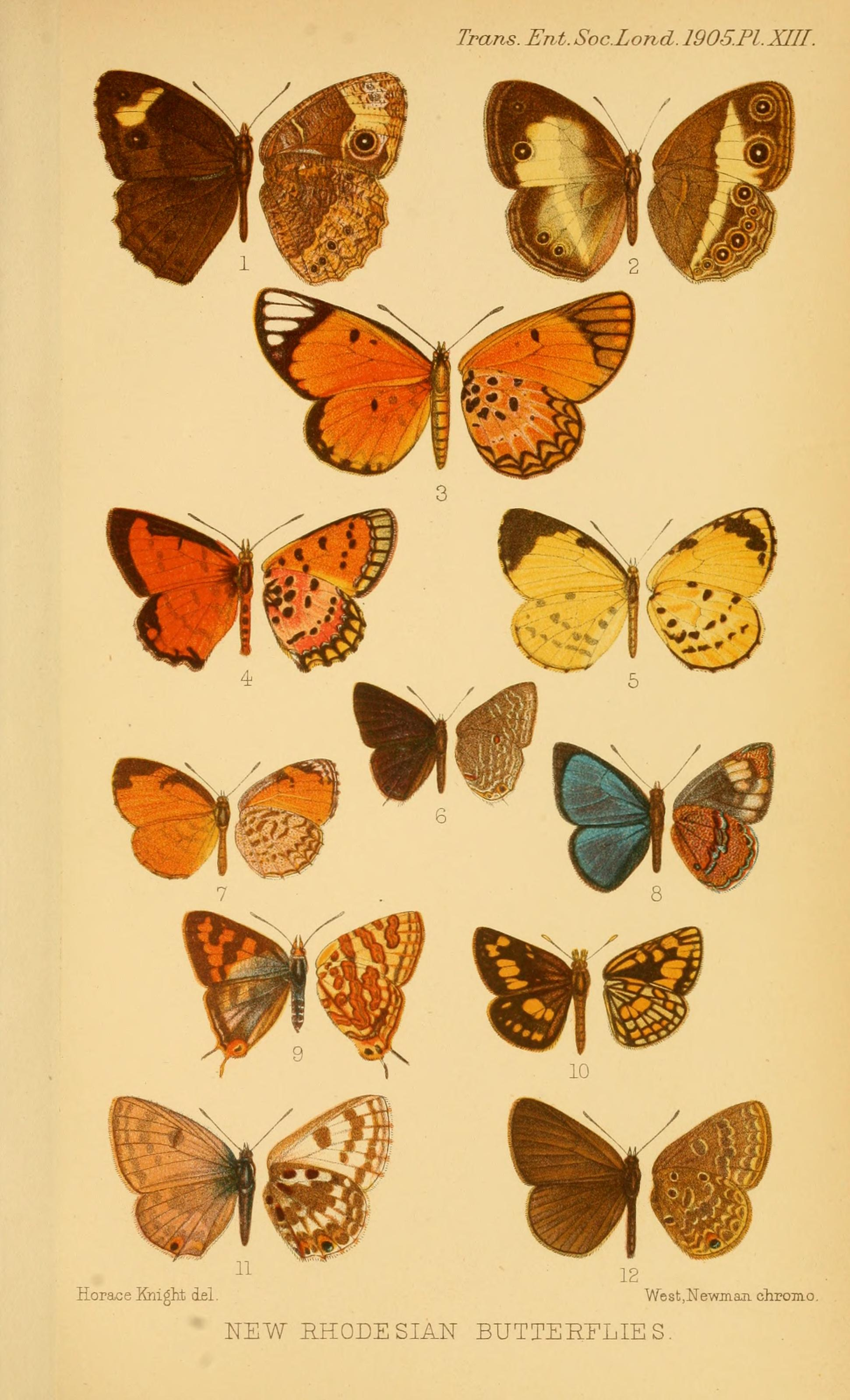
- Figure 8 which accompanied the original description

Scientific classification
- Kingdom: Animalia
- Phylum: Arthropoda
- Class: Insecta
- Order: Lepidoptera
- Family: Lycaenidae
- Genus: Iridana
- Species: I. euprepes

Binomial name
- Iridana euprepes (H. H. Druce, 1905)

Synonyms
- Iridopsis euprepes H. H. Druce, 1905

= Iridana euprepes =

Species of butterfly

Iridana euprepes is a butterfly in the family Lycaenidae first described by Hamilton Herbert Druce in 1905. It is found in the Democratic Republic of the Congo.
