= Iridana marina =

Scientific classification
- Domain: Eukaryota
- Kingdom: Animalia
- Phylum: Arthropoda
- Class: Insecta
- Order: Lepidoptera
- Family: Lycaenidae
- Genus: Iridana
- Species: I. marina

Binomial name
- Iridana marina Talbot, 1935

Species of butterfly

Iridana marina is a butterfly in the family Lycaenidae. It is found in Uganda, the north-eastern part of the Democratic Republic of the Congo and north-western Tanzania. The habitat consists of forests.

The larvae probably feed on lichens among ants.
