= Iridana rougeoti =

Scientific classification
- Domain: Eukaryota
- Kingdom: Animalia
- Phylum: Arthropoda
- Class: Insecta
- Order: Lepidoptera
- Family: Lycaenidae
- Genus: Iridana
- Species: I. rougeoti

Binomial name
- Iridana rougeoti Stempffer, 1964

Species of butterfly

Iridana rougeoti, the Rougeot's sapphire gem, is a butterfly in the family Lycaenidae. It is found in Sierra Leone, Ivory Coast, Ghana, western Nigeria, Gabon, the Central African Republic and the Democratic Republic of the Congo. The habitat consists of forests.
