= Iridana ghanana =

Scientific classification
- Domain: Eukaryota
- Kingdom: Animalia
- Phylum: Arthropoda
- Class: Insecta
- Order: Lepidoptera
- Family: Lycaenidae
- Genus: Iridana
- Species: I. ghanana

Binomial name
- Iridana ghanana Stempffer, 1964

Species of butterfly

Iridana ghanana, the Ghana sapphire gem, is a butterfly in the family Lycaenidae. It is found in Ghana and Cameroon. Its habitat consists of forests.
