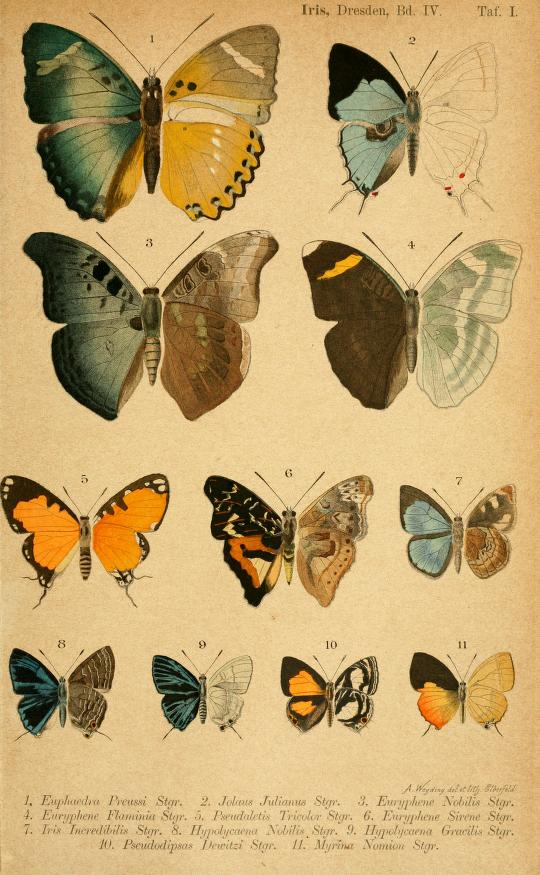
- Iridana incredibilis figure 7

Scientific classification
- Kingdom: Animalia
- Phylum: Arthropoda
- Clade: Pancrustacea
- Class: Insecta
- Order: Lepidoptera
- Family: Lycaenidae
- Subfamily: Poritiinae
- Genus: Iridana; Aurivillius, 1921

Synonyms
- Iridopsis Aurivillius, 1898 (preocc.); Iris Staudinger, 1891 (preocc.)

= Iridana =

Butterfly genus in family Lycaenidae

Iridana is a genus of butterflies in the family Lycaenidae. The species of this genus are endemic to the Afrotropical realm.

The only known specimen of I. agneshorvathae was collected at light in Bia National Park in western Ghana from a dry semi-deciduous forest and is most likely a canopy species. It may or may not be endemic to the Ghana subregion of West Africa.

== Species ==
- Iridana agneshorvathae Collins, Larsen & Sáfián, 2008
- Iridana bwamba Stempffer, 1964
- Iridana euprepes (Druce. 1905)
- Iridana exquisita (Grose-Smith, 1898)
- Iridana gabunica Stempffer, 1964
- Iridana ghanana Stempffer, 1964
- Iridana hypocala Eltringham, 1929
- Iridana incredibilis (Staudinger, 1891)
- Iridana jacksoni Stempffer, 1964
- Iridana katera Stempffer, 1964
- Iridana kollariki Sáfián and Collins, 2014
- Iridana marina Talbot, 1935
- Iridana nigeriana Stempffer, 1964
- Iridana obscura Stempffer, 1964
- Iridana perdita (Kirby, 1890)
- Iridana rougeoti Stempffer, 1964
- Iridana tororo Stempffer, 1964
- Iridana unyoro Stempffer, 1964

An image of the underside of a male I. kollariki is included in A Sharp Eye on Butterflies of Ghana.
