= Iridana gabunica =

Scientific classification
- Kingdom: Animalia
- Phylum: Arthropoda
- Clade: Pancrustacea
- Class: Insecta
- Order: Lepidoptera
- Family: Lycaenidae
- Genus: Iridana
- Species: I. gabunica

Binomial name
- Iridana gabunica Stempffer, 1964

Species of butterfly

Iridana gabunica is a butterfly in the family Lycaenidae. It is found in Gabon.
