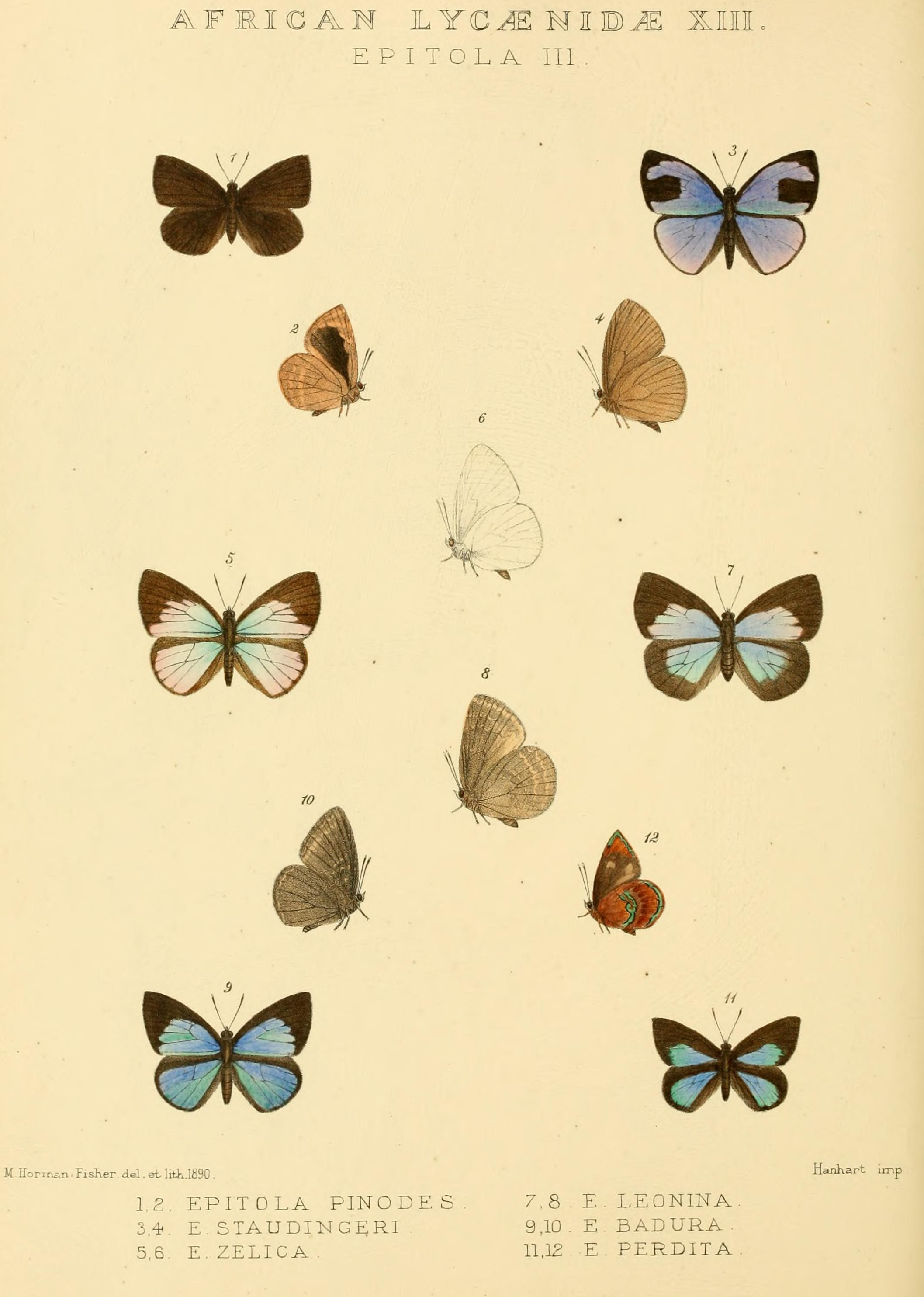

Scientific classification
- Kingdom: Animalia
- Phylum: Arthropoda
- Class: Insecta
- Order: Lepidoptera
- Family: Lycaenidae
- Genus: Iridana
- Species: I. perdita

Binomial name
- Iridana perdita (Kirby, 1890)

Synonyms
- Epitola perdita Kirby, 1890

= Iridana perdita =

Species of butterfly

Iridana perdita is a butterfly in the family Lycaenidae. It is found in Cameroon and possibly Uganda.
