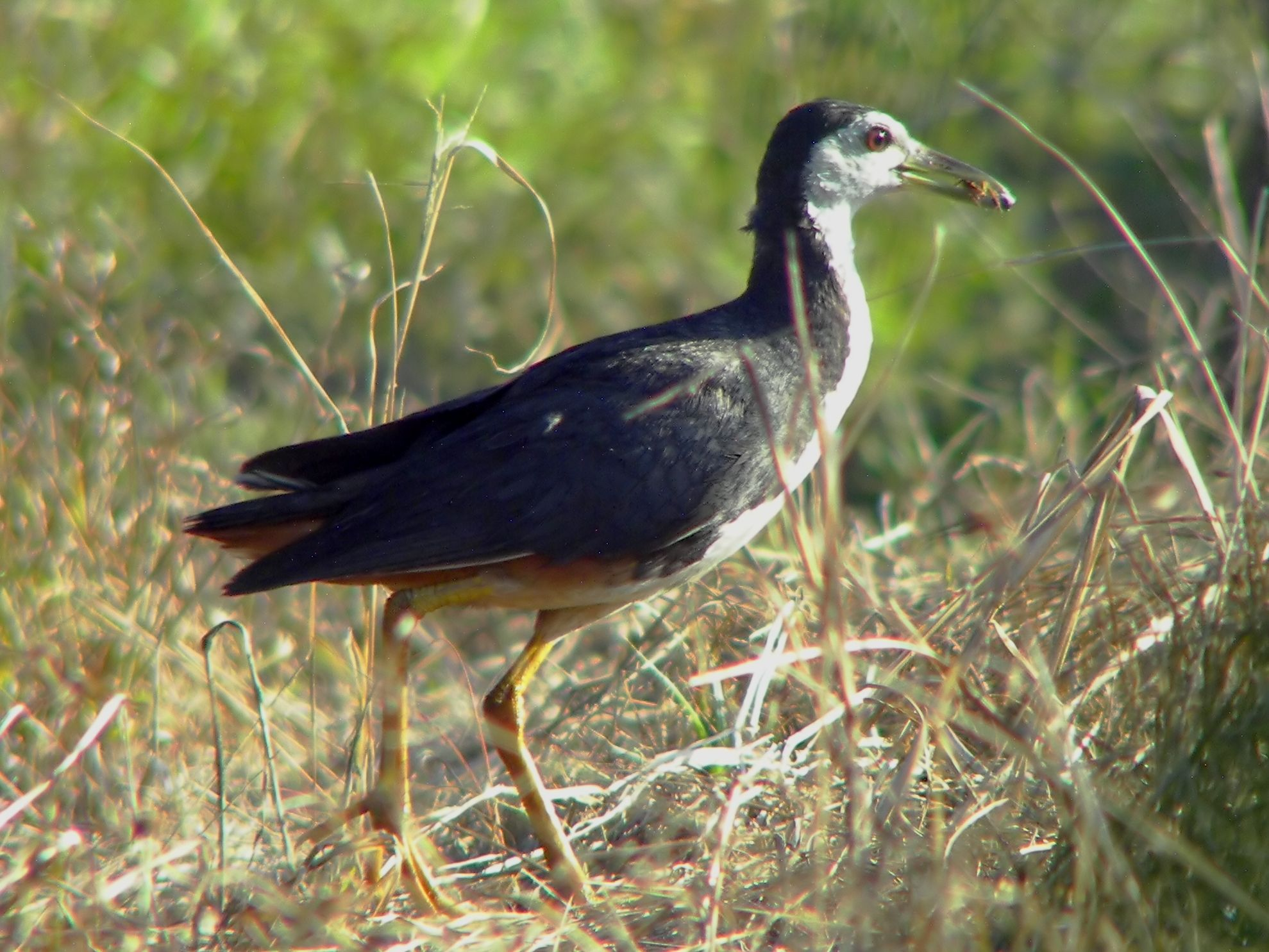
- White-breasted waterhen (Amaurornis phoenicurus)

Scientific classification
- Kingdom: Animalia
- Phylum: Chordata
- Class: Aves
- Order: Gruiformes
- Family: Rallidae
- Genus: Amaurornis; Reichenbach, 1853

Type species
- Gallinula olivacea (Philippine bush-hen) Meyen, 1834

Species
- see text

Synonyms
- Poliolimnas Sharpe, 1893 (but see text)

= Amaurornis =

Genus of birds

Amaurornis is a genus of birds in the rail family Rallidae. The species in this genus are typically called bush-hens. A monotypic subtribe, Amaurornithina, was proposed for this genus.

== Taxonomy ==
The genus Amaurornis was erected by the German naturalist Ludwig Reichenbach in 1853 with the plain bush-hen (Amaurornis olivacea) as the type species. The name comes from the Greek amauros, meaning "dusky" or "brown" and ornis, meaning "bird".

The New Guinea flightless rail was sometimes included in this genus, but more often held to constitute a distinct monotypic genus Megacrex. The first cladistic studies of rails, based on morphology, strongly suggested that Amaurornis as traditionally defined is not monophyletic, and that several species placed here are in fact closer to the small crakes traditionally placed in Porzana. This was subsequently confirmed by molecular data. However, these smallish species are probably not close to the large members of Porzana either, and would warrant re-establishment of the old genus Zapornia.

=== Species ===
The genus contains five species:

Image	Scientific name	Common name	Distribution
	Amaurornis phoenicurus	White-breasted waterhen	tropical Asia from Pakistan east to Indonesia
	Amaurornis olivacea	Philippine bush-hen or Plain bush-hen	Philippines
	Amaurornis magnirostris	Talaud bush-hen	Talaud Islands, Indonesia
	Amaurornis isabellina	Isabelline bush-hen	Sulawesi
	Amaurornis moluccana	Pale-vented bush-hen, rufous-tailed bush-hen or rufous-tailed waterhen	Australia, the Moluccan Islands, New Guinea, the Bismarck Archipelago and the Solomon Islands
