= Iridana tororo =

Scientific classification
- Domain: Eukaryota
- Kingdom: Animalia
- Phylum: Arthropoda
- Class: Insecta
- Order: Lepidoptera
- Family: Lycaenidae
- Genus: Iridana
- Species: I. tororo

Binomial name
- Iridana tororo Stempffer, 1964

Species of butterfly

Iridana tororo is a butterfly in the family Lycaenidae. It is found in eastern Uganda and western Kenya. Indeed, the species which these belong to can be found across Africa, in the Afrotropical Realm.
