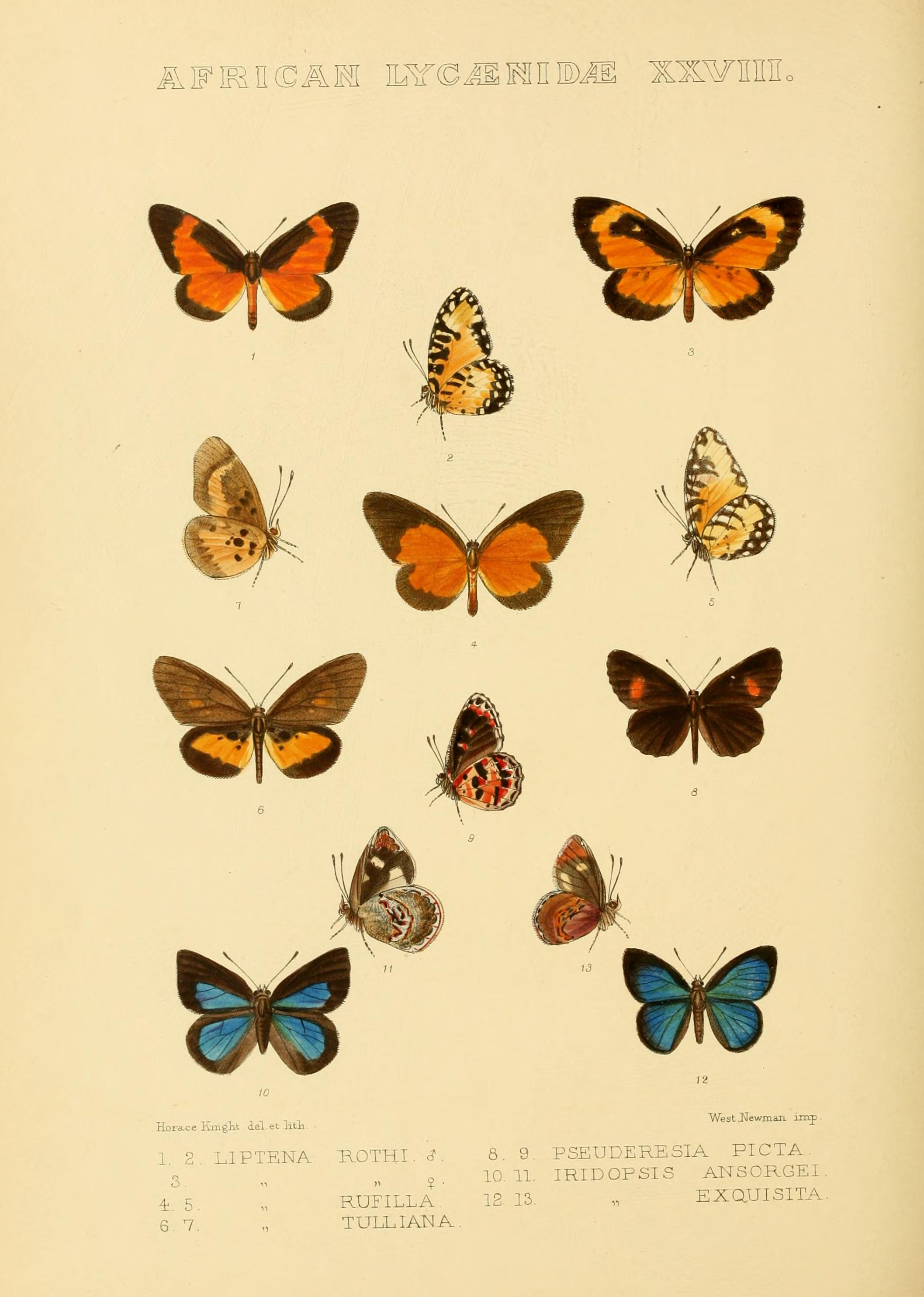
- Figures 12 and 13

Scientific classification
- Domain: Eukaryota
- Kingdom: Animalia
- Phylum: Arthropoda
- Class: Insecta
- Order: Lepidoptera
- Family: Lycaenidae
- Genus: Iridana
- Species: I. exquisita

Binomial name
- Iridana exquisita (Grose-Smith, 1898)

Synonyms
- Iris exquisita Grose-Smith, 1898

= Iridana exquisita =

Species of butterfly

Iridana exquisita, the exquisite sapphire gem, is a butterfly in the family Lycaenidae. It is found in Ghana, western Nigeria, Cameroon, the Republic of the Congo and Gabon. The habitat consists of forests.
