= Iridana unyoro =

Scientific classification
- Kingdom: Animalia
- Phylum: Arthropoda
- Class: Insecta
- Order: Lepidoptera
- Family: Lycaenidae
- Genus: Iridana
- Species: I. unyoro

Binomial name
- Iridana unyoro Stempffer, 1964

Species of butterfly

Iridana unyoro is a butterfly in the family Lycaenidae. It is found in western Uganda and north-western Tanzania.
