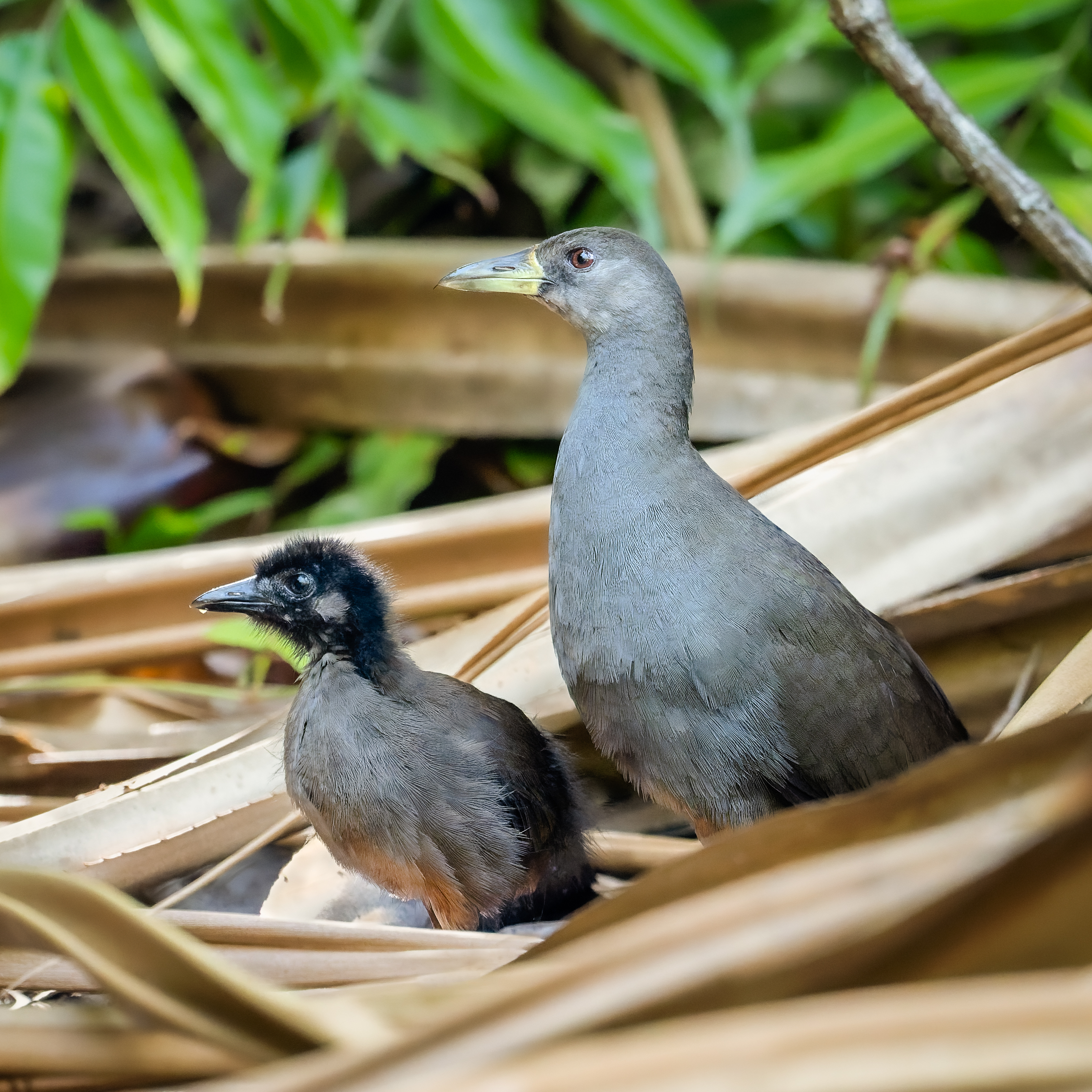

Conservation status
- Least Concern (IUCN 3.1)

Scientific classification
- Kingdom: Animalia
- Phylum: Chordata
- Class: Aves
- Order: Gruiformes
- Family: Rallidae
- Genus: Amaurornis
- Species: A. moluccana

Binomial name
- Amaurornis moluccana (Wallace, 1865)

Synonyms
- Amaurornis moluccanus

= Pale-vented bush-hen =

Species of bird

The pale-vented bush-hen or rufous-tailed bush-hen (Amaurornis moluccana) is a medium sized waterbird, mainly blue-grey with a buff vent and undertail. It is found in Australia, the Moluccan Islands, New Guinea, the Bismarck Archipelago and the Solomon Islands. Its natural habitat is subtropical or tropical moist lowland forests.

== Taxonomy and systematics ==
The pale-vented bush-hen is a member of the family Rallidae which includes crakes and rails. The genus name Amaurornis (Reichenbach 1853) is from the Greek for dark, shadowy or dim, amauros, and bird, ornis.

The species name Amaurornis moluccana (Wallace, 1865) means "Moluccan dark and shadowy bird" and relates its original discovery in the Moluccan Islands, Indonesia. The term pale-vented came into use in the late 1990s as a descriptive term, when the species of bush hens in Australia and New Guinea were separated from the Plain Bush-hen (A. olivaceus) endemic to the Philippines.

It is widely known in Australia as simply "bush-hen" but has also been known as rufous-tailed or rufous-vented rail, crake or moorhen or brown rail. Gould believed he had found a new species, Gallinula ruficrissa in 1869 giving it the common name of rufous-vented gallinule.

== Description ==
The pale-vented bush-hen is medium sized with a body length between 25 and 30 cm (9.8 and 11.8 in), wing length of 140 to 155 mm (5.5 to 6.1 in), bill length of 28 to 33 mm (1.1 to 1.3 in) and weighing between 150 and 210 grams (5.3 and 7.4 oz). It has a dull gray-blue body, brown wings and tail. Its eponymous pale coloured vent and undertail are variously described as buff-ruffous, rufous-brown, buff or reddish-brown.

The bill is distinctive being lime green with an orange red frontal shield when breeding and duller green with no red when not breeding. The legs are olive-yellow and the eye dark. There is no apparent difference between sexes. Juveniles are paler in colour.

== Behaviour and ecology ==
The pale-vented bush-hen is a shy and secretive bird best seen at dawn, dusk or when overcast. It is found in low, dense vegetation on the edge of water courses or wetlands. The bird is best detected by its loud, distinctive calls which include clucks and clicks, shrieks or wails.

The bird is found in Australia, the Moluccan Islands, New Guinea, the Bismarck Archipelago and the Solomon Islands. In Australia it is found mostly in coastal and subcoastal regions from the Top End of the Northern Territory and Cape York Peninsula south through eastern Queensland to north-eastern NSW. They appear to be scarce in the Top End of the Northern Territory and in the Kimberly region of Western Australia.

The IUCN Red List identifies its conservation status as Least Concern. Its conservation status in New South Wales is listed as Vulnerable, in the Northern Territory as Near Threatened and in Queensland as Least Concern.
