= Iridana nigeriana =

Scientific classification
- Domain: Eukaryota
- Kingdom: Animalia
- Phylum: Arthropoda
- Class: Insecta
- Order: Lepidoptera
- Family: Lycaenidae
- Genus: Iridana
- Species: I. nigeriana

Binomial name
- Iridana nigeriana Stempffer, 1964

Species of butterfly

Iridana nigeriana, the Nigerian sapphire gem, is a butterfly in the family Lycaenidae. It is found in Ivory Coast, Ghana, southern and eastern Nigeria and Cameroon. The habitat consists of forests.
