= Iridana bwamba =

Scientific classification
- Kingdom: Animalia
- Phylum: Arthropoda
- Clade: Pancrustacea
- Class: Insecta
- Order: Lepidoptera
- Family: Lycaenidae
- Genus: Iridana
- Species: I. bwamba

Binomial name
- Iridana bwamba Stempffer, 1964

Species of butterfly

Iridana bwamba is a butterfly in the family Lycaenidae. It is found in Uganda (from the western part of the country to the Bwamba Valley).
