= Iridana agneshorvathae =

Scientific classification
- Domain: Eukaryota
- Kingdom: Animalia
- Phylum: Arthropoda
- Class: Insecta
- Order: Lepidoptera
- Family: Lycaenidae
- Genus: Iridana
- Species: I. agneshorvathae

Binomial name
- Iridana agneshorvathae Collins, Larsen & Sáfián, 2008

Species of butterfly

Iridana agneshorvathae is a butterfly in the family Lycaenidae. It is found in Ghana. The habitat consists of dry semi-deciduous forests.

The length of the forewings is about 16 mm.
