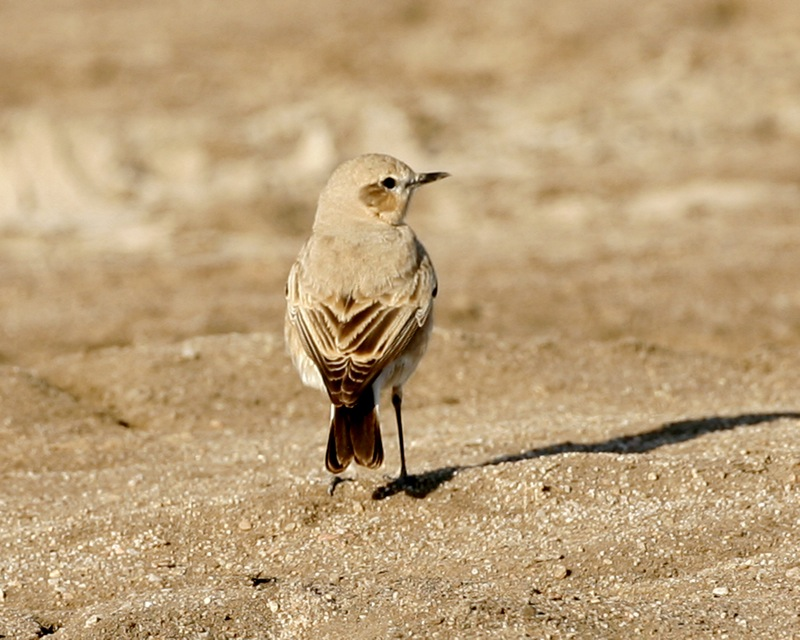
- bird showing black tail

Conservation status
- Least Concern (IUCN 3.1)

Scientific classification
- Kingdom: Animalia
- Phylum: Chordata
- Class: Aves
- Order: Passeriformes
- Family: Muscicapidae
- Genus: Oenanthe
- Species: O. isabellina

Binomial name
- Oenanthe isabellina (Temminck, 1829)

= Isabelline wheatear =

Species of bird

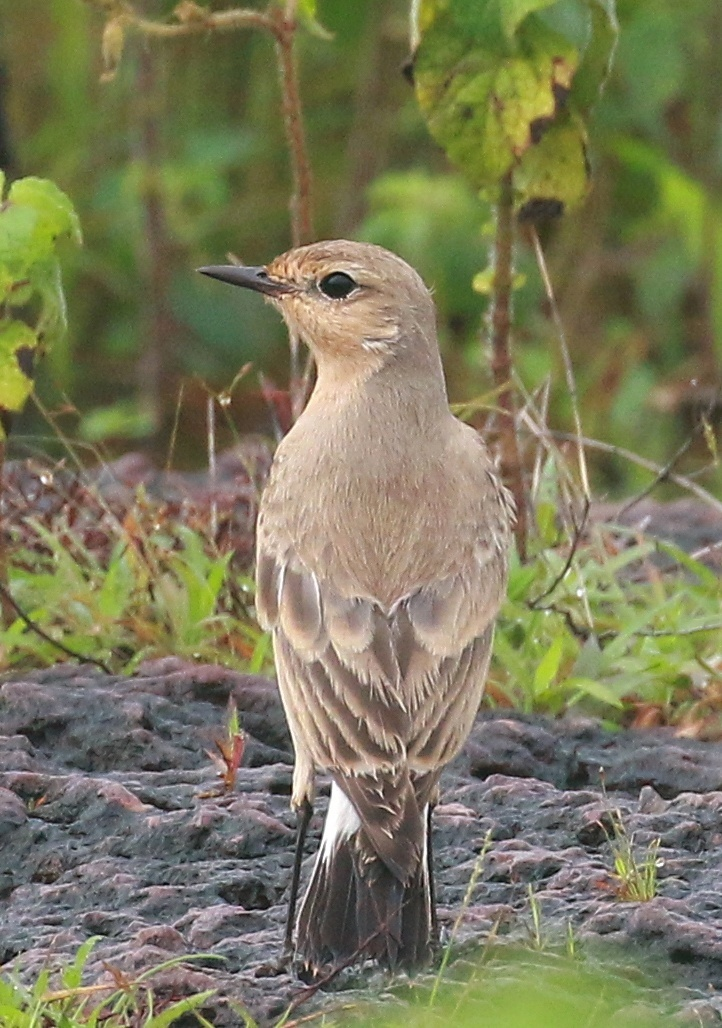
Isabelline wheatear, Oenanthe isabellina from Thrithala Palakkad, Kerala, India

The isabelline wheatear (Oenanthe isabellina) is a small passerine bird that was formerly classed as a member of the thrush family Turdidae, but is now more generally considered to be an Old World flycatcher in the family Muscicapidae. It is a migratory insectivorous bird. Its habitat is steppe and open countryside and it breeds in southern Russia and Central Asia to northern Pakistan, wintering in Africa and northwestern India. It is a very rare vagrant to western Europe.

In colouring it resembles a female northern wheatear but it is larger at 15–16.5 centimetres (5.9–6.5 in) in length, more upright and more tawny in colour, and has more black on its tail. The term isabelline refers to the parchment-like colouration. The axillaries and underwing coverts are white, whereas in the commoner bird they are mottled with grey. The sexes are similar.

== Etymology ==
The name is from the specific isabellinus, Neo-Latin for "greyish-yellow", and is likely in reference to Isabella I of Castile, who is said to have promised not to change her undergarments until Spain was freed from the Moors. "Wheatear" is not derived from "wheat" or any sense of "ear", but is a 16th-century linguistic corruption of "white" and "arse", referring to the prominent white rump found in most species. The genus name Oenanthe is derived from the Ancient Greek oenos (οίνος) "wine" and anthos (ανθός) "flower". It refers to the northern wheatear's return to Greece in the spring just as the grapevines blossom.

== Description ==
Male and female isabelline wheatear are similar in appearance. The upper-parts are a pale sandy brown with an isabelline tinge (isabelline is a pale grey-yellow, fawn, cream-brown or parchment colour). The lower back is isabelline and the rump and upper tail-coverts are white. The tail feathers are brownish-black with a narrow edge and tip of buff and a large white base. In the outer tail feathers this occupies more than half the length of the feather but in the central feathers it is about one third. There is an over-eye streak of creamy white and the ear-coverts are pale brown. The chin is pale cream and the throat pale buff. The breast is sandy or isabelline buff and the belly creamy white. The under tail-coverts are pale buff and the under wing-coverts and axilliaries white with dark bases. The wing feathers are brownish-black, tipped and edged with creamy buff. The beak, legs and feet are black and the irises are brown.

At a length of 16.5 centimetres (6.5 in) it is rather larger and also paler in colour than the northern wheatear (Oenanthe oenanthe). The beak is longer than that bird and the ear-coverts are paler but otherwise the birds are very similar in appearance and could be confused. The plumage is moulted twice a year, there being a complete moult in late summer and a partial moult of the body feathers in mid-winter.

The call note is a chirp, and a loud whistle is sometimes emitted. The song has been described as lark-like and starts with a croaking noise followed by various whistles and includes mimicry of the voices of other birds.

== Distribution and habitat ==
The isabelline wheatear is a migratory species with an eastern palearctic breeding range. This extends from Southern Russia, the Caspian region, the Kyzyl Kum Desert and Mongolia to Afghanistan, Iran, Iraq, Saudi Arabia, Syria, Jordan and Israel. It winters in Africa and northwestern India. It has occurred as a summer vagrant to Greece, Cyprus, Algeria and Tunisia.

In the breeding season the isabelline wheatear is found in open country, barren tracts of land, arid regions, steppes, high plateaux and on the lower slopes of hills. In its winter quarters it occupies similar habitats in semi-arid regions, open country with sparse scrub and the borders of cultivated areas, showing a particular liking for sandy ground.

== Behaviour ==
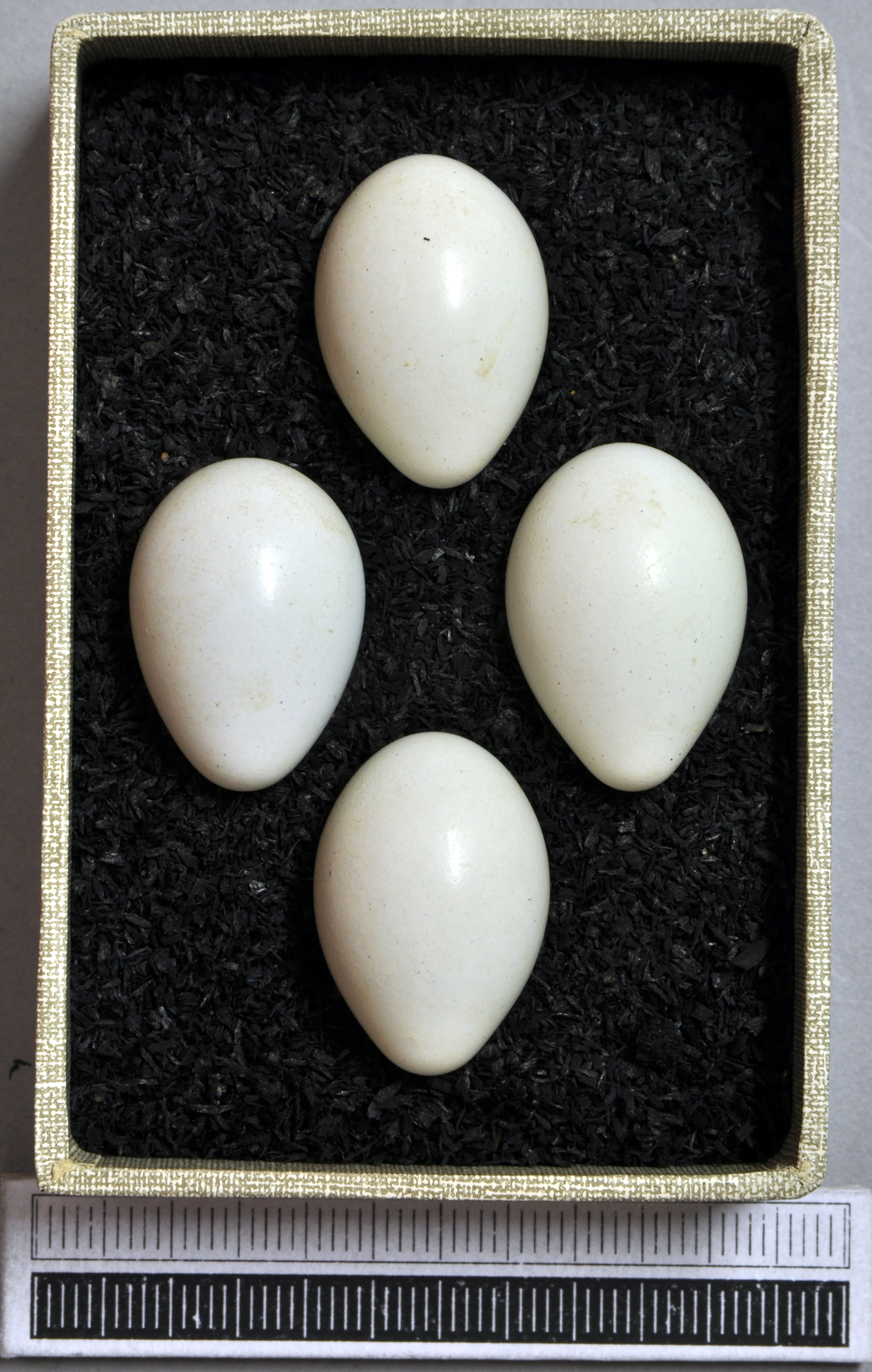
Eggs, Collection Museum Wiesbaden

The isabelline wheatear is an active and restless bird, moving across the ground with long hops, flitting into the air and perching on eminences or small bushes. Its posture is rather upright and it is constantly bobbing about and flaring, raising and lowering its tail. It sometimes flutters into the air to catch insect prey but mostly forages along the ground, probing the soil with its beak. Its diet includes ants, grasshoppers, moths, flies, mites, spiders and insect larvae, and it sometimes eats seeds as well.

Isabelline wheatears are solitary birds in their winter quarters and may associate with other Oenanthe species during migration. On arrival at their breeding grounds they establish territories. The male isabelline wheatear displays to the female by drooping and then spreading his wings while singing, leaping a short distance in the air, or flying up fifteen metres (fifty feet) or so, hovering and performing stunts, singing all the while, before landing again beside the female. The nest is usually underground, normally in the empty burrow of a pika, ground squirrel or mole rat, or they may excavate a fresh burrow. The nest is bulky and is composed of dried grasses. Four to six pale blue eggs are laid, usually unmarked but sometimes with a scattering of reddish speckles. The average size of the eggs is 22.16 by 16.6 millimetres (0.872 in × 0.654 in). Both parents feed the chicks with small caterpillars and other insects. After they leave the nest, the chicks continue to be fed for about two weeks but after this the parents drive them out of the territory. The breeding season starts at the end of March in Turkey but does not commence until May in Central Asia. There are probably two broods in the southern parts of the range.

== Status ==
The isabelline wheatear has an extensive range, estimated as being 11.7 million square kilometres (4.36 million square miles), and a large population with an estimated total of 26 million to 378 million individuals. The population seems to be stable and the IUCN in their Red List of Threatened Species has evaluated this species as being of "least concern".
