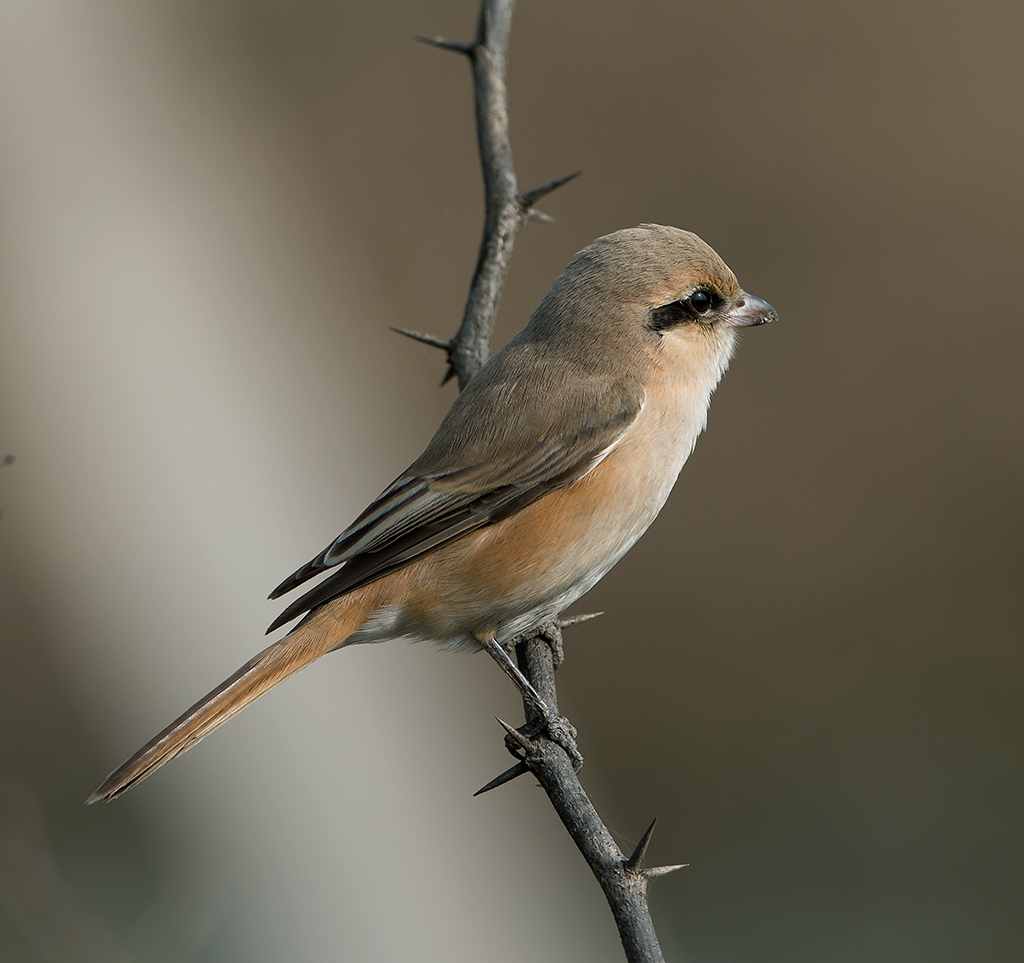

Conservation status
- Least Concern (IUCN 3.1)

Scientific classification
- Kingdom: Animalia
- Phylum: Chordata
- Class: Aves
- Order: Passeriformes
- Family: Laniidae
- Genus: Lanius
- Species: L. isabellinus

Binomial name
- Lanius isabellinus Hemprich & Ehrenberg, 1833

= Isabelline shrike =

Species of bird

The isabelline shrike or Daurian shrike (Lanius isabellinus) is a member of the shrike family (Laniidae). It was previously considered conspecific with the red-backed shrike and red-tailed shrike. It is found in an extensive area between the Caspian Sea and north and central China southeast to the Qaidam Basin. Overwinters in Africa and Arabia.

== Etymology ==
The genus name, Lanius, is derived from the Latin word for "butcher", and some shrikes are also known as "butcher birds" because of their feeding habits. The common name is from the specific isabellinus, Neo-Latin for "greyish-yellow" probably named for Isabella I of Castile, said to have promised not to change her undergarments until Spain was freed from the Moors. The common English name "shrike" is from Old English scríc, "shriek", referring to the shrill call.

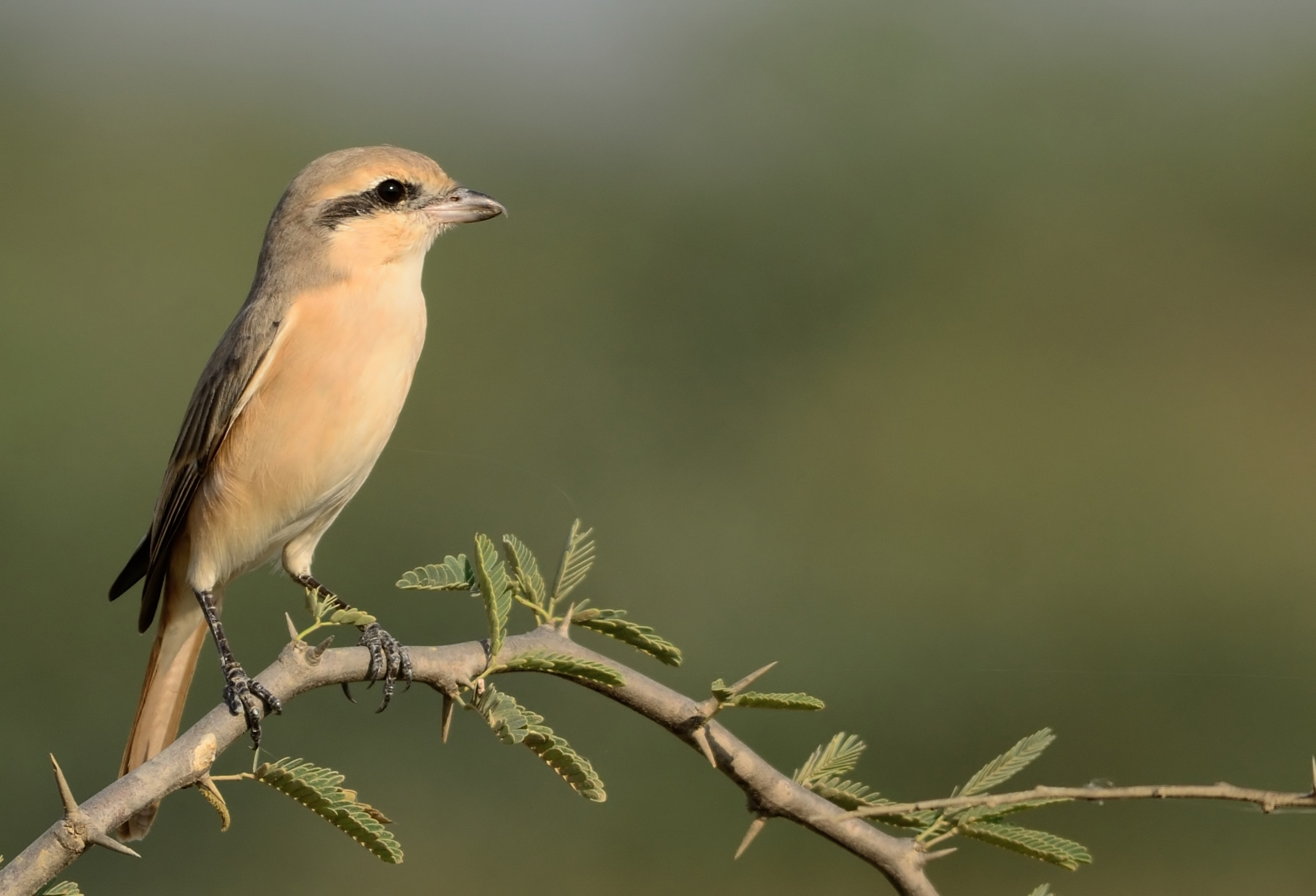
wintering in Great Rann of Kutch

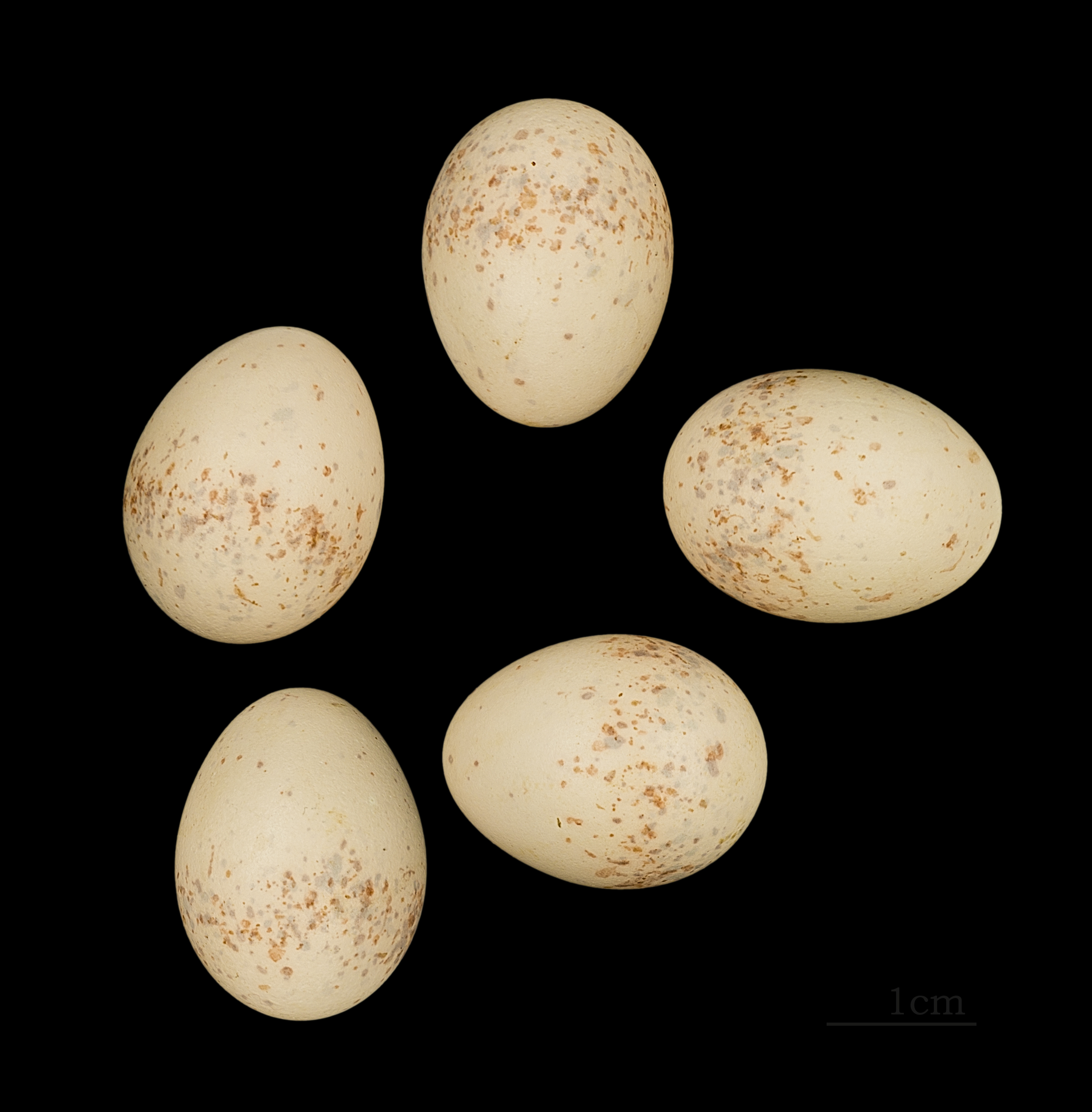
Lanius isabellinus - MHNT

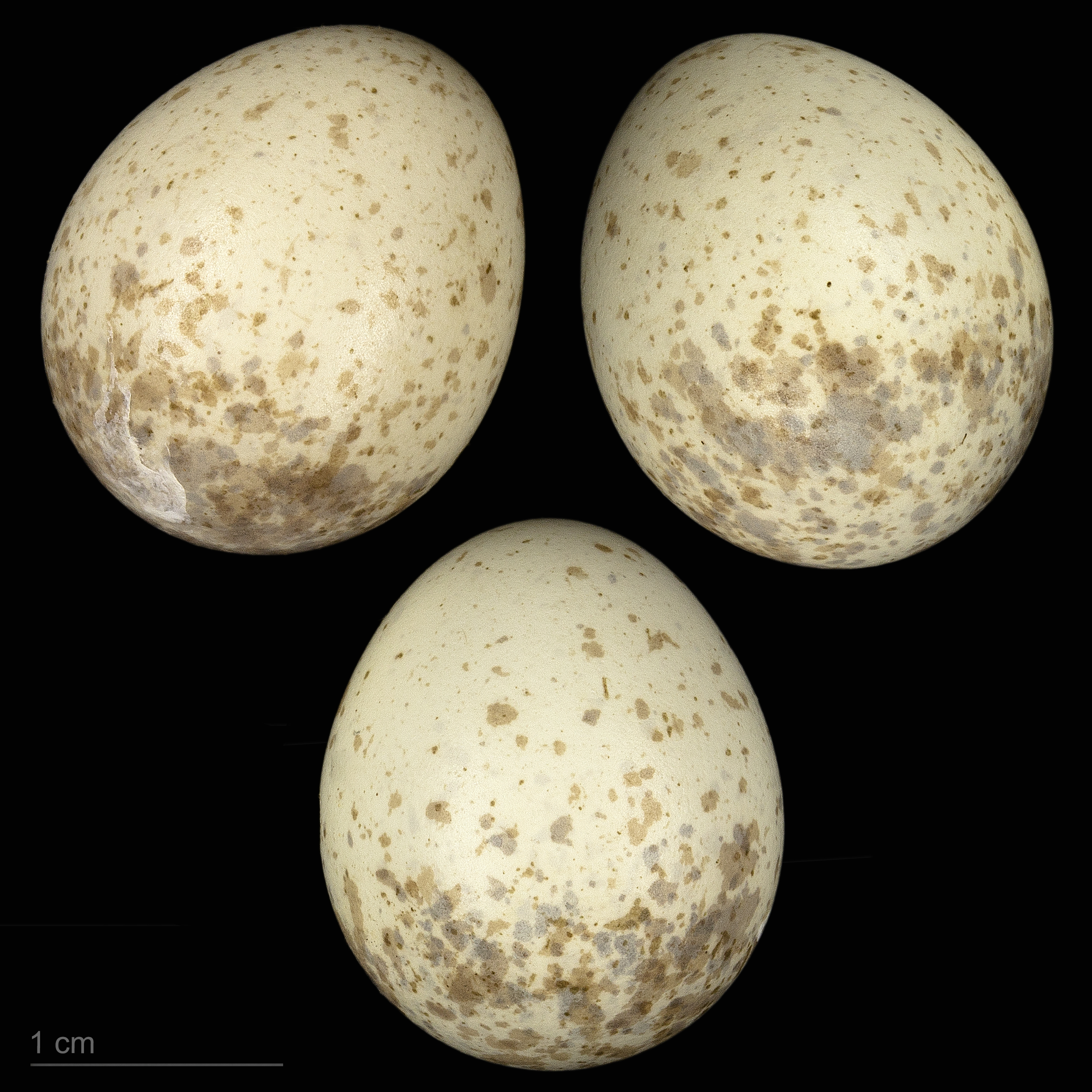
Lanius isabellinus phoenicuroides - MHNT

== Habits ==
This migratory medium-sized passerine eats large insects, small birds, rodents and lizards. Like other shrikes it hunts from prominent perches, and impales corpses on thorns or barbed wire as a larder. It breeds in open cultivated country, preferably with thorn bushes.

== Description ==
The plumage is isabelline, the sandy colour which gives rise to its name. It has a red tail. Young birds can be distinguished from young red-backed shrikes by the much sparser vermiculations on the underparts.
