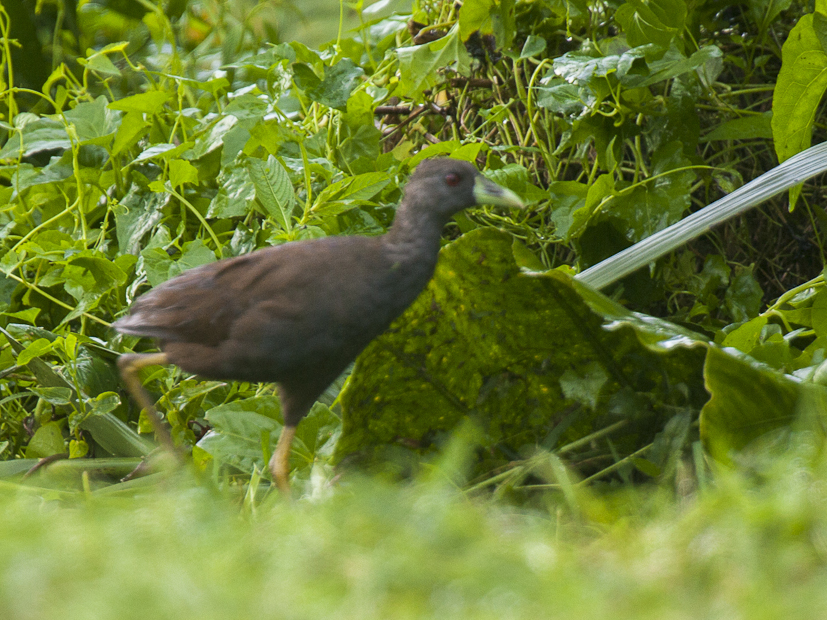
- in Luzon.

Conservation status
- Least Concern (IUCN 3.1)

Scientific classification
- Kingdom: Animalia
- Phylum: Chordata
- Class: Aves
- Order: Gruiformes
- Family: Rallidae
- Genus: Amaurornis
- Species: A. olivacea

Binomial name
- Amaurornis olivacea (Meyen, 1834)

Synonyms
- Amaurornis olivaceus (orthographic error)

= Philippine bush-hen =

Species of bird

The Philippine bush-hen (Amaurornis olivacea), also known as the plain bush-henor simply bush-hen, is a species of bird in the family Rallidae. It is endemic to the Philippines.

== Description and taxonomy ==
It was formerly considered conspecific with the Pale-vented bush-hen, but is differentiated by its darker plumage and by being on average slightly larger (though with much overlap). It is 24–31 cm long, with a dark brown crown, nape, back, and wings, and a dark grey face, throat, breast and belly; the under-tail coverts are dark orange-brown. The legs are light orange-brown, and the bill straw-yellow.

This species is monotypic.

== Ecology and behaviour ==
There have been no species specific studies on its breeding and diet but it is presumed to have the same behaviour as the pale-vented bush-hen. Feeds on insects, mostly earthworms and larvae, small vertebrates and vegetable matter.

Not much is known about breeding but has records almost throughout the year. Nests in swampy conditions with a cup shaped nest made of plant matter. Known to lay 4 creamy white eggs with red spots.

== Habitat and conservation status ==
This species occupies swampy grassland, shrubland and forest edge.

The International Union for Conservation of Nature has assessed it as a Least-concern species owing to its wide range despite being generally uncommon. It is recommended that this be reassessed to Data deficient as its ecology and population are basically unknown. Both wetlands and forests in the Philippines are at risk from deforestation and land conversion.
