= Talaud bush-hen =

Conservation status
- Vulnerable (IUCN 3.1)

Scientific classification
- Kingdom: Animalia
- Phylum: Chordata
- Class: Aves
- Order: Gruiformes
- Family: Rallidae
- Genus: Amaurornis
- Species: A. magnirostris

Binomial name
- Amaurornis magnirostris Lambert, 1998

Species of bird

The Talaud bush-hen (Amaurornis magnirostris) is a vulnerable waterbird in the rail and crake family.

It is a recently described species from Karakelang Island in the Talaud Islands, Indonesia. It occurs in forest, scrub, and overgrown plantations.

== Description ==
The Talaud bush-hen is a 30.5 cm (12.0 in) long, large, very dark and robust bush-hen. Its large head and its upperparts are dark brown, its underparts and flanks are very dark bluish grey. The large, thick bill is pale green, and the legs are yellow, becoming more olive at the rear. Its only confirmed call is a series of loud, low-pitched croaking barks, but it is likely that it also makes the shrieks typical of bush-hens.

== Status ==
The global population has been estimated at 2,500-20,000 individuals.. It may also occur on neighbouring islands, but there is little forest on those, less than 20 km^{2} (7.7 sq mi) compared to 350 km^{2} (140 sq mi) on Karakelang. There are two protected areas totalling 21,800 ha (218 km^{2}) but they are threatened by agricultural encroachment, illegal logging, and fire. Trapping for food and introduced rats may also pose a threat.
