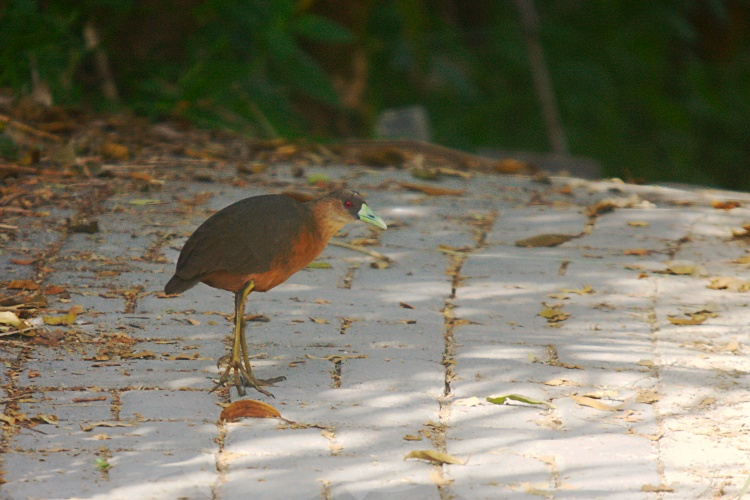

Conservation status
- Least Concern (IUCN 3.1)

Scientific classification
- Kingdom: Animalia
- Phylum: Chordata
- Class: Aves
- Order: Gruiformes
- Family: Rallidae
- Genus: Amaurornis
- Species: A. isabellina

Binomial name
- Amaurornis isabellina (Schlegel, 1865)

Synonyms
- Amaurornis isabellinus

= Isabelline bush-hen =

Species of bird

The isabelline bush-hen (Amaurornis isabellina), also known as Sulawesi waterhen or isabelline waterhen, is a large, up to 40 cm long, rufous and brown rail. The term isabelline refers to the colouration. It is the largest member of the genus Amaurornis. Both sexes are similar with olive brown plumage, pale green bill, greenish brown legs and rufous below.

An Indonesian endemic, the isabelline waterhen is confined to grasslands near waters and lowlands of Sulawesi. The call is a loud "tak-tak-tak-tak".

Widespread throughout its natural habitat, the isabelline waterhen is evaluated as least concern on the IUCN Red List of Threatened Species.
