= Isabelline (colour) =

Colour

Colour coordinates
- Hex triplet: #F4F0EC
- sRGB^{B} (r, g, b): (244, 240, 236)
- HSV (h, s, v): (30°, 3%, 96%)
- CIELCh_{uv} (L, C, h): (95, 4, 55°)
- Source: Maerz and Paul
- ISCC–NBS descriptor: Yellowish white
- B: Normalized to [0–255] (byte)

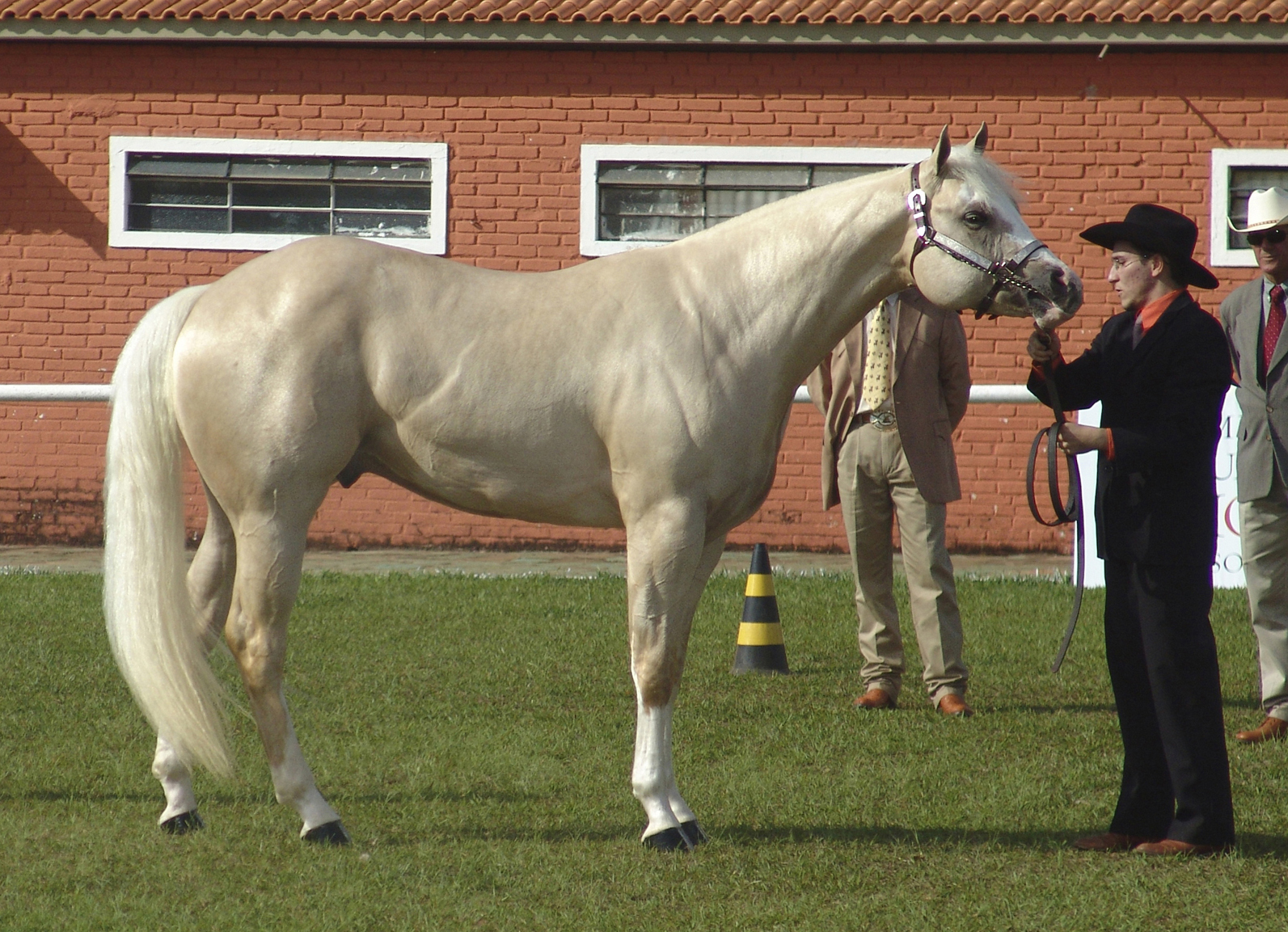
Light palomino Quarter Horse, which may be described as isabelline

Isabelline (/ˌɪzəˈbɛlɪn/ IZ-ə-BEL-in), also known as isabella, is a pale grey-yellow, pale fawn, pale cream-brown or parchment colour. It is primarily found in animal coat colouring, particularly plumage colour in birds and, in Europe, in horses. It also has historically been applied to fashion. The first known record of the word was in 1600 as isabella colour; this use later became interchangeable in literature with isabelline after the latter was introduced into print in 1859. The origin of the word is unclear; the uncertainty prompted by this has generated several attempts to provide an etymology and led to one prominent legend.

== Usage and origins ==
The first recorded use of isabella as the name of a colour in English was in the year 1600, to describe an item in Elizabeth I of England's wardrobe inventory: "one rounde gowne of Isabella-colour satten ... set with silver spangles". Isabelline as a derivative term was first used in the journal Ibis in 1859 by Henry Baker Tristram to describe the common colour of the upper plumage in the birds of Northern Africa, though the Latinized colour term was already used by Coenraad Jacob Temminck in 1823 for the scientific name of the Sinai desert lark which was discussed by Tristram in his 1859 paper, and at that time held to be a distinct species Ammomanes isabellina.

A few theories have been proposed for the origin of the colour's name. According to a popular legend, the name comes from Infanta Isabella Clara Eugenia of Spain; during the Siege of Ostend, which started in July 1601, Isabella is claimed to have vowed not to change her shift until the siege was over, expecting a quick victory for her husband Archduke Albert of Austria. Since the siege lasted over three years, finally ending in September 1604, it is claimed that the discolouration of her shift in that interval led to the naming of the colour. However, this theory was discounted by the Oxford English Dictionary as the word was in use before the siege had begun. A variation refers to a similar story involving the Spanish queen Isabella I of Castile and the eight-month siege of Granada by Ferdinand II of Aragon starting in April 1491. This siege ended in January 1492 and again was said to have resulted in an overworn shift belonging to Isabella, however this legend is also not true.

Other theories focus on animals close to the colour as the source of the word. In 1904 several writers to the journal Notes and Queries, prompted by a question of etymology, submitted that the word could have begun as a corruption of the word zibellino (a sable pelt accessory), noting the similarity in colour and the popularity of the accessory around the period the word first came into use. Etymologist Michael Quinion reported that certain sources suggested an alleged Arabic word for lion, izah, might be the origin, indicating an intended original meaning close to "lion-coloured", but has since concluded that "there seems to be no such word in Arabic and we must disregard the suggestion".

== In animals ==
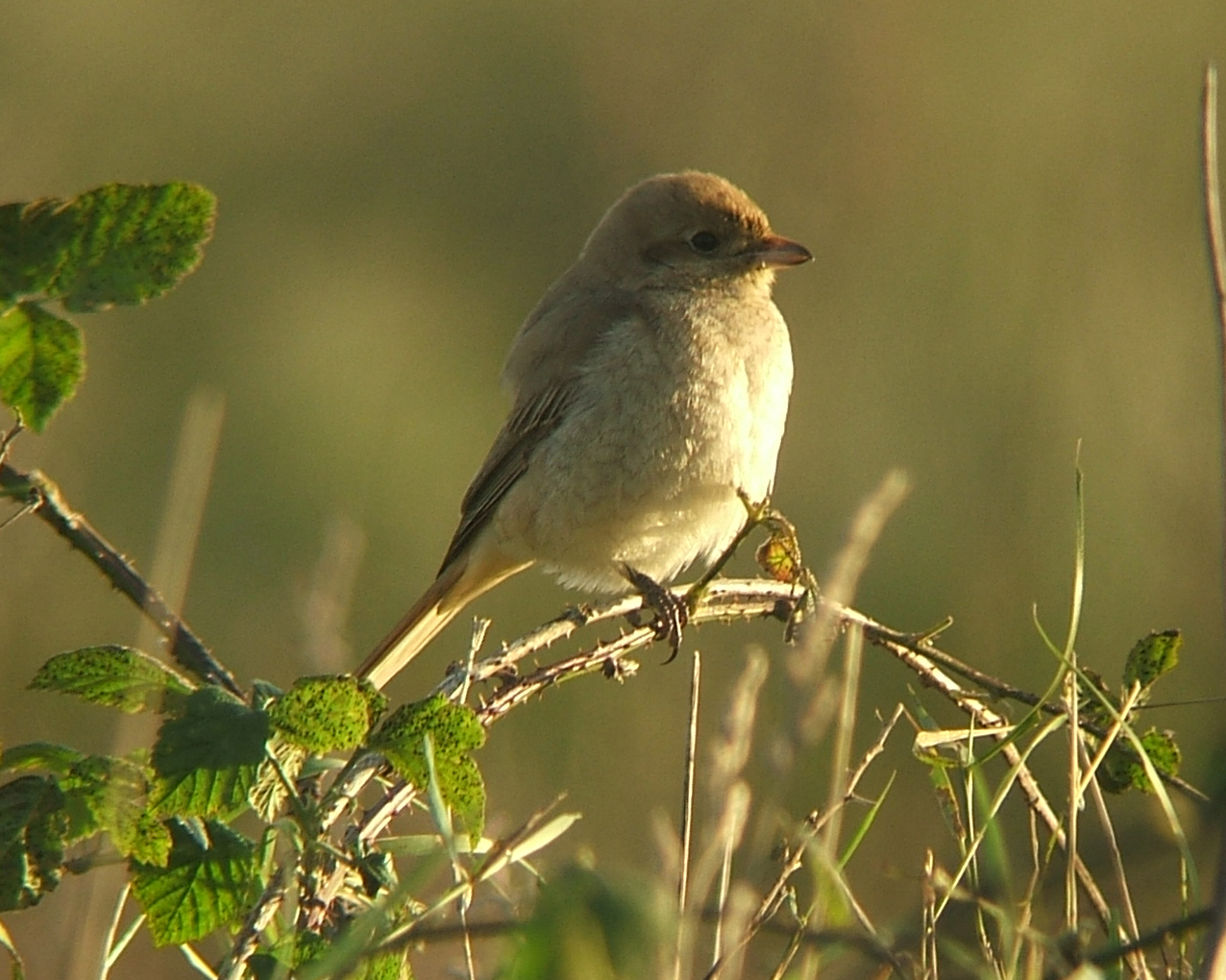
Isabelline shrike

The term is found in reference to plumage colouring in the bird species names isabelline bush-hen, isabelline wheatear, and isabelline shrike, as well as in other descriptions of birds. The genetic pigmentation disorder isabellinism seen in birds is derived from the colour word and is a form of leucism caused by a uniform reduction in the production and expression of melanin resulting in areas of plumage on the back of the bird, normally black, being strongly faded, or isabelline, in appearance. Isabellinism has been reported in several species of penguin. However, only about one in every 50,000 penguins possess this trait.

Isabelline and isabella are terms applied in Europe to very pale palomino or cremello horses, animals with a coat colour that is variously described as cream, pale gold or almost white; this is the primary usage of the French (isabelle) and German (Isabella) versions of the word. In horses, this colour is created by the action of the cream gene, an incomplete dominant dilution gene that produces a horse with a gold coat and dark eyes when heterozygous, and a light cream-coloured horse with blue eyes when homozygous.

A subspecies of the brown bear (Ursus arctos isabellinus) was named for the colour and is also sometimes known as the isabelline bear.

In the Pacific Northwest, members of a subspecies of the Canadian porcupine (Erethizon dorsatum subsp. epixanthum) have been found with a recognizable yellow colouration to their quills. The porcupines found with this distinct coloration did not have albinism, the eyes and nose having their typical pigmentation, and are thus described as isabelline in terms of colouration.

The description has also been used in the UK for fawn-coloured Doberman dogs.

== Literary usage ==
Rudyard Kipling mentioned this colour in "Kim": "a Hindu urchin in a dirty turban and Isabella-coloured clothes".

== See also ==
- List of colours
- Animal colouration
- Equine coat colour genetics
