= List of birds of the Falkland Islands =

This is a list of the bird species recorded in the Falkland Islands. The avifauna of the Falkland Islands include a total of 219 confirmed species, of which two are endemic, two have been introduced by humans, two have become locally extinct, and 122 are rare or vagrants. Twenty-eight additional species are unconfirmed (see below).

The entries on this list and the list's taxonomic treatment (designation and sequence of orders, families, and species) and nomenclature (common and scientific names) are those of the IOC World Bird List.

The following tags have been used to highlight several categories of occurrence in addition to non-endemic resident species and regular visitors.

- (V) Vagrant - a species that rarely or accidentally occurs in the Falklands
- (E) Endemic - a species endemic to the Falklands
- (I) Introduced - a species introduced to the Falklands as a consequence, direct or indirect, of human actions
- (Ex) Extinct - a species which formerly occurred in the Falklands
- (U) Unconfirmed - a species recorded in the Falklands but with "no tangible evidence" according to the SACC

== Swans, geese and ducks ==
Order: Anseriformes Family: Anatidae

Anatidae includes the ducks and most duck-like waterfowl, such as geese and swans. These birds are adapted to an aquatic existence with webbed feet, flattened bills, and feathers that are excellent at shedding water due to an oily coating.

- White-faced whistling duck, Dendrocygna viduata (V)
- Greylag goose, Anser anser (I)
- Black-necked swan, Cygnus melancoryphus
- Coscoroba swan, Coscoroba coscoroba
- Upland goose, Chloephaga picta
- Kelp goose, Chloephaga hybrida
- Ashy-headed goose, Chloephaga poliocephala (V)
- Ruddy-headed goose, Chloephaga rubidiceps
- Flying steamer duck, Tachyeres patachonicus
- Falkland steamer duck, Tachyeres brachypterus (E)
- Crested duck, Lophonetta specularioides
- Spectacled duck, Speculanas specularis (U)
- Silver teal, Spatula versicolor
- Red shoveler, Spatula platalea (V)
- Blue-winged teal, Spatula discors (V)
- Cinnamon teal, Spatula cyanoptera
- Chiloe wigeon, Mareca sibilatrix
- White-cheeked pintail, Anas bahamensis (V)
- Yellow-billed pintail, Anas georgica
- Yellow-billed teal, Anas flavirostris
- Rosy-billed pochard, Netta peposaca (V)
- Black-headed duck, Heteronetta atricapilla (U)
- Lake duck, Oxyura vittata (V)

== Flamingos ==
Order: Phoenicopteriformes Family: Phoenicopteridae

Flamingos are gregarious wading birds, usually 1 to 1.5 metres (3 ft 3.4 in to 4 ft 11.1 in) tall, found in both the Western and Eastern Hemispheres. Flamingos filter-feed on shellfish and algae. Their oddly shaped beaks are specially adapted to separate mud and silt from the food they consume and, uniquely, are used upside-down.

- Chilean flamingo, Phoenicopterus chilensis (V)

== Grebes ==
Order: Podicipediformes Family: Podicipedidae

Grebes are small to medium-large freshwater diving birds. They have lobed toes and are excellent swimmers and divers. However, they have their feet placed far back on the body, making them quite ungainly on land.

- White-tufted grebe, Rollandia rolland
- Pied-billed grebe, Podilymbus podiceps (V)
- Great grebe, Podiceps major (V)
- Silvery grebe, Podiceps occipitalis

== Pigeons ==
Order: Columbiformes Family: Columbidae

Pigeons and doves are stout-bodied birds with short necks and short slender bills with a fleshy cere.

- Picazuro pigeon, Patagioenas picazuro (V)
- Chilean pigeon, Patagioenas araucana (V)
- Eared dove, Zenaida auriculata (V)
- Blue ground dove, Claravis pretiosa (U)
- Black-winged ground dove, Metriopelia melanoptera (V)
- Ruddy ground dove, Columbina talpacoti (V)

== Cuckoos ==
Order: Cuculiformes Family: Cuculidae

The family Cuculidae includes cuckoos, roadrunners, and anis. These birds are of variable size with slender bodies, long tails, and strong legs. The Old World cuckoos are brood parasites.

- Dark-billed cuckoo, Coccyzus melacoryphus (V)
- Yellow-billed cuckoo, Coccyzus americanus (V)

== Nightjars ==
Order: Caprimulgiformes Family: Caprimulgidae

Nightjars are medium-sized nocturnal birds that usually nest on the ground. They have long wings, short legs, and very short bills. Most have small feet, of little use for walking, and long pointed wings. Their soft plumage is camouflaged to resemble bark or leaves.

- Band-winged nightjar, Systellura longirostris (V)

== Swifts ==
Order: Apodiformes Family: Apodidae

Swifts are small birds which spend the majority of their lives flying. These birds have very short legs and never settle voluntarily on the ground, perching instead only on vertical surfaces. Many swifts have long swept-back wings which resemble a crescent or boomerang.

- White-collared swift, Streptoprocne zonaris (V)
- Sick's swift, Chaetura meridionalis (V)

== Hummingbirds ==
Order: Apodiformes Family: Trochilidae

Hummingbirds are small birds capable of hovering in mid-air due to the rapid flapping of their wings. They are the only birds that can fly backwards.

- Green-backed firecrown, Sephanoides sephaniodes (V)

== Rails ==
Order: Gruiformes Family: Rallidae

Rallidae is a large family of small to medium-sized birds which includes the rails, crakes, coots, and gallinules. Typically they inhabit dense vegetation in damp environments near lakes, swamps, or rivers. In general they are shy and secretive birds, making them difficult to observe. Most species have strong legs and long toes which are well adapted to soft uneven surfaces. They tend to have short rounded wings and to be weak fliers.

- Austral rail, Rallus antarcticus (V)
- Purple gallinule, Porphyrio martinica (V)
- Speckled rail, Coturnicops notatus (U)
- Plumbeous rail, Pardirallus sanguinolentus (V)
- Red-fronted coot, Fulica rufifrons (V)
- Red-gartered coot, Fulica armillata (V)
- White-winged coot, Fulica leucoptera

== Plovers ==
Order: Charadriiformes Family: Charadriidae

The family Charadriidae includes the plovers, dotterels, and lapwings. They are small to medium-sized birds with compact bodies, short thick necks, and long, usually pointed, wings. They are found in open country worldwide, mostly in habitats near water.

- Grey plover, Pluvialis squatarola (V)
- American golden plover, Pluvialis dominica (V)
- Tawny-throated dotterel, Oreopholus ruficollis (V)
- Rufous-chested dotterel, Zonibyx modestus
- Southern lapwing, Vanellus chilensis (V)
- Two-banded plover, Anarynchus falklandicus

== Oystercatchers ==
Order: Charadriiformes Family: Haematopodidae

The oystercatchers are large and noisy plover-like birds, with strong bills used for smashing or prising open molluscs.

- Blackish oystercatcher, Haematopus ater
- Magellanic oystercatcher, Haematopus leucopodus

== Avocets and stilts ==
Order: Charadriiformes Family: Recurvirostridae

Recurvirostridae is a family of large wading birds, which includes the avocets and stilts. The avocets have long legs and long up-curved bills. The stilts have extremely long legs and long, thin, straight bills.

- White-backed stilt, Himantopus melanurus (V)

== Sheathbills ==
Order: Charadriiformes Family: Chionididae

The sheathbills are scavengers of the Antarctic regions. They have white plumage and look plump and dove-like but are believed to be similar to the ancestors of the modern gulls and terns.

- Snowy sheathbill, Chionis alba

== Magellanic plover ==
Order: Charadriiformes Family: Pluvianellidae

The Magellanic plover is a rare wader found only in southernmost South America. In its build and habits it is similar to a turnstone. Its upperparts and breast are pale grey, and the rest of the underparts are white. It has short red legs, a black bill and a red eye. In young birds, the eyes and legs are yellowish.

- Magellanic plover, Pluvianellus socialis (U)

== Sandpipers ==
Order: Charadriiformes Family: Scolopacidae

Scolopacidae is a large diverse family of small to medium-sized shorebirds including the sandpipers, curlews, godwits, shanks, tattlers, woodcocks, snipes, dowitchers, and phalaropes. The majority of these species eat small invertebrates picked out of the mud or soil. Variation in length of legs and bills enables multiple species to feed in the same habitat, particularly on the coast, without direct competition for food.

- Upland sandpiper, Bartramia longicauda (V)
- Eskimo curlew, Numenius borealis (U) (believed extinct)
- Hudsonian whimbrel, Numenius hudsonicus
- Hudsonian godwit, Limosa haemastica
- Ruddy turnstone, Arenaria interpres (V)
- Red knot, Calidris canutus (U)
- Surfbird, Calidris virgata (U)
- Stilt sandpiper, Calidris himantopus (V)
- Sanderling, Calidris alba
- Baird's sandpiper, Calidris bairdii
- White-rumped sandpiper, Calidris fuscicollis
- Pectoral sandpiper, Calidris melanotos
- Semipalmated sandpiper, Calidris pusilla (U)
- Magellanic snipe, Gallinago magellanica
- Wilson's phalarope, Phalaropus tricolor (V)
- Red phalarope, Phalaropus fulicarius (V)
- Spotted sandpiper, Actitis macularius (V)
- Greater yellowlegs, Tringa melanoleuca (V)
- Lesser yellowlegs, Tringa flavipes (V)

== Seedsnipes ==
Order: Charadriiformes Family: Thinocoridae

The seedsnipes are a small family of birds that superficially resemble small partridges. They have short legs and long wings and are herbivorous waders.

- White-bellied seedsnipe, Attagis malouinus (V)
- Least seedsnipe, Thinocorus rumicivorus (V)

== Painted-snipes ==
Order: Charadriiformes Family: Rostratulidae

Painted-snipe are short-legged long-billed birds similar in shape to the true snipes, but more brightly coloured.

- South American painted-snipe, Rostratula semicollaris (V)

== Skuas ==
Order: Charadriiformes Family: Stercorariidae

The family Stercorariidae are, in general, medium to large birds, typically with grey or brown plumage, often with white markings on the wings. They nest on the ground in temperate and arctic regions and are long-distance migrants.

- Chilean skua, Stercorarius chilensis
- South polar skua, Stercorarius maccormicki
- Brown skua, Stercorarius antarctica
- Arctic skua, Stercorarius parasiticus
- Long-tailed skua, Stercorarius longicaudus

== Gulls ==
Order: Charadriiformes Family: Laridae

Laridae is a family of medium to large seabirds and includes gulls, kittiwakes, and terns. Gulls are typically grey or white, often with black markings on the head or wings. They have longish bills and webbed feet. Terns are a group of generally medium to large seabirds typically with grey or white plumage, often with black markings on the head. Most terns hunt fish by diving but some pick insects off the surface of fresh water. Terns are generally long-lived birds, with several species known to live in excess of 30 years.

- Black noddy, Anous minutus (U)
- Brown-hooded gull, Chroicocephalus maculipennis
- Grey-hooded gull, Chroicocephalus cirrocephalus (U)
- Dolphin gull, Leucophaeus scoresbii
- Grey gull, Leucophaeus modestus (U)
- Franklin's gull, Leucophaeus pipixcan (V)
- Olrog's gull, Larus atlanticus (U)
- Kelp gull, Larus dominicanus
- Sooty tern, Onychoprion fuscatus (V)
- Common tern, Sterna hirundo (V)
- Arctic tern, Sterna paradisaea (V)
- South American tern, Sterna hirundinacea
- Antarctic tern, Sterna vittata
- Snowy-crowned tern, Sterna trudeaui (V)
- Cabot's tern, Thalasseus acuflavidus (V)

== Penguins ==
Order: Sphenisciformes Family: Spheniscidae

The penguins are a group of flightless aquatic birds living almost exclusively in the Southern Hemisphere. Most penguins feed on krill, fish, squid, and other forms of sealife caught while swimming underwater.

- King penguin, Aptenodytes patagonicus
- Emperor penguin, Aptenodytes forsteri (V)
- Gentoo penguin, Pygoscelis papua
- Adelie penguin, Pygoscelis adeliae (V)
- Chinstrap penguin, Pygoscelis antarctica (V)
- Magellanic penguin, Spheniscus magellanicus
- Erect-crested penguin, Eudyptes sclateri (V)
- Macaroni penguin, Eudyptes chrysolophus
- Northern rockhopper penguin, Eudyptes moseleyi (V)
- Rockhopper penguin, Eudyptes chrysocome
- Snares penguin, Eudyptes robustus (V)

== Albatrosses ==
Order: Procellariiformes Family: Diomedeidae

The albatrosses are among the largest of flying birds, and the great albatrosses from the genus Diomedea have the largest wingspans of any extant birds.

- Southern royal albatross, Diomedea epomophora
- Wandering albatross, Diomedea exulans
- Sooty albatross, Phoebetria fusca (V)
- Light-mantled albatross, Phoebetria palpebrata
- Atlantic yellow-nosed albatross, Thalassarche chlororhynchos (V)
- Black-browed albatross, Thalassarche melanophris
- Grey-headed albatross, Thalassarche chrysostoma
- Buller's albatross, Thalassarche bulleri (U)
- White-capped albatross, Thalassarche cauta

== Southern storm petrels ==
Order: Procellariiformes Family: Oceanitidae

The storm petrels are the smallest seabirds, relatives of the petrels, feeding on planktonic crustaceans and small fish picked from the surface, typically while hovering. The flight is fluttering and sometimes bat-like. Until 2018, this family was included with the other storm petrels in family Hydrobatidae.

- White-bellied storm petrel, Fregetta grallaria (U)
- Black-bellied storm petrel, Fregetta tropica
- Wilson's storm petrel, Oceanites oceanicus
- Grey-backed storm petrel, Garrodia nereis
- White-faced storm petrel, Pelagodroma marina (V)

== Northern storm petrels ==
Order: Procellariiformes Family: Hydrobatidae

Though the members of this family are similar in many respects to the southern storm petrels, including their general appearance and habits, there are enough genetic differences to warrant their placement in a separate family.

- Leach's storm petrel, Hydrobates leucorhous (U)

== Shearwaters ==
Order: Procellariiformes Family: Procellariidae

The procellariids are the main group of medium-sized petrels, characterised by united nostrils with medium septum and a long outer functional primary.

- Southern giant petrel, Macronectes giganteus
- Northern giant petrel, Macronectes halli
- Southern fulmar, Fulmarus glacialoides
- Antarctic petrel, Thalassoica antarctica
- Pintado petrel, Daption capense
- Snow petrel, Pagodroma nivea (V)
- Kerguelen petrel, Aphrodroma brevirostris
- Great-winged petrel, Pterodroma macroptera (V)
- Soft-plumaged petrel, Pterodroma mollis
- Atlantic petrel, Pterodroma incerta
- White-headed petrel, Pterodroma lessonii (V)
- Kermadec petrel, Pterodroma neglecta (U)
- Trindade petrel, Pterodroma arminjoniana (V)
- Mottled petrel, Pterodroma inexpectata (V)
- Blue petrel, Halobaena caerulea
- Fairy prion, Pachyptila turtur
- Broad-billed prion, Pachyptila vittata (V)
- Antarctic prion, Pachyptila desolata
- Slender-billed prion, Pachyptila belcheri
- Grey petrel, Procellaria cinerea
- White-chinned petrel, Procellaria aequinoctialis
- Spectacled petrel, Procellaria conspicillata (V)
- Westland petrel, Procellaria westlandica (V)
- Cory's shearwater, Calonectris diomedea (V)
- Sooty shearwater, Ardenna griseus
- Great shearwater, Ardenna gravis
- Flesh-footed shearwater, Ardenna carneipes (V)
- Manx shearwater, Puffinus puffinus (V)
- Little shearwater, Puffinus assimilis
- Common diving petrel, Pelecanoides urinatrix
- South Georgia diving petrel, Pelecanoides georgicus (V)
- Magellanic diving petrel, Pelecanoides magellani

== Storks ==
Order: Ciconiiformes Family: Ciconiidae

Storks are large, long-legged, long-necked wading birds with long stout bills. Storks are mute, but bill-clattering is an important mode of communication at the nest. Their nests can be large and may be reused for many years. Many species are migratory.

- Maguari stork, Ciconia maguari (V)

== Boobies ==
Order: Suliformes Family: Sulidae

The sulids comprise the gannets and boobies. Both groups are medium to large coastal seabirds that plunge-dive for fish.

- Peruvian booby, Sula variegata (V)

== Cormorants ==
Order: Suliformes Family: Phalacrocoracidae

Phalacrocoracidae is a family of medium to large coastal, fish-eating seabirds that includes cormorants and shags. Plumage colour varies, with the majority having mainly dark plumage, some species being black-and-white, and a few being more brightly coloured.

- Red-legged cormorant, Phalacrocorax gaimardi (V)
- Neotropic cormorant, Phalacrocorax brasilianus (V)
- Magellanic cormorant, Phalacrocorax magellanicus
- Imperial cormorant, Phalacrocorax atriceps

== Herons ==
Order: Pelecaniformes Family: Ardeidae

The family Ardeidae contains the bitterns, herons, and egrets. Herons and egrets are medium to large wading birds with long necks and legs. Bitterns tend to be shorter necked and more wary. Members of Ardeidae fly with their necks retracted, unlike other long-necked birds such as storks, ibises and spoonbills.

- Black-crowned night heron, Nycticorax nycticorax
- Snowy egret, Egretta thula (V)
- Striated heron, Butorides striata (V)
- Cattle egret, Bubulcus ibis
- Great egret, Ardea alba (V)
- Cocoi heron, Ardea cocoi (V)

== Ibises ==
Order: Pelecaniformes Family: Threskiornithidae

Threskiornithidae is a family of large terrestrial and wading birds which includes the ibises and spoonbills. They have long, broad wings with 11 primary and about 20 secondary feathers. They are strong fliers and despite their size and weight, very capable soarers.

- Black-faced ibis, Theristicus melanopis (V)
- Roseate spoonbill, Platalea ajaja (V)

== New World vultures ==
Order: Accipitriformes Family: Cathartidae

The New World vultures are not closely related to Old World vultures, but superficially resemble them because of convergent evolution. Like the Old World vultures, they are scavengers. However, unlike Old World vultures, which find carcasses by sight, New World vultures have a good sense of smell with which they locate carrion.

- Turkey vulture, Cathartes aura

== Hawks ==
Order: Accipitriformes Family: Accipitridae

Accipitridae is a family of birds of prey, which includes hawks, eagles, kites, harriers, and Old World vultures. These birds have powerful hooked beaks for tearing flesh from their prey, strong legs, powerful talons, and keen eyesight.

- Cinereous harrier, Circus cinereus (V)
- Long-winged harrier, Circus buffoni (U)
- Sharp-shinned hawk, Accipter striatus (V)
- Variable hawk, Geranoaetus polysoma

== Barn owls ==
Order: Strigiformes Family: Tytonidae

Barn owls are medium to large owls with large heads and characteristic heart-shaped faces. They have long strong legs with powerful talons.

- American barn owl, Tyto furcata

== Owls ==
Order: Strigiformes Family: Strigidae

The typical owls are small to large solitary nocturnal birds of prey. They have large forward-facing eyes and ears, a hawk-like beak, and a conspicuous circle of feathers around each eye called a facial disk.

- Magellanic horned owl, Bubo magellanicus (U)
- Burrowing owl, Athene cunicularia (V)
- Short-eared owl, Asio flammeus

== Falcons ==
Order: Falconiformes Family: Falconidae

Falconidae is a family of diurnal birds of prey. They differ from hawks, eagles, and kites in that they kill with their beaks instead of their talons.

- Crested caracara, Caracara plancus
- Striated caracara, Phalcoboenus australis
- Chimango caracara, Milvago chimango (V)
- American kestrel, Falco sparverius (V)
- Aplomado falcon, Falco femoralis (V)
- Peregrine falcon, Falco peregrinus

== New World and African parrots ==
Order: Psittaciformes Family: Psittacidae

Parrots are small to large birds with a characteristic curved beak. Their upper mandibles have slight mobility in the joint with the skull and they have a generally erect stance. All parrots are zygodactyl, having the four toes on each foot placed two at the front and two to the back

- Austral parakeet, Enicognathus ferrugineus (U)
- Burrowing parakeet, Cyanoliseus patagonus (U)

== Tapaculos ==
Order: Passeriformes Family: Rhinocryptidae

The tapaculos are small suboscine passeriform birds with numerous species in South and Central America. They are terrestrial species that fly only poorly on their short wings. They have strong legs, well-suited to their habitat of grassland or forest undergrowth. The tail is cocked and pointed towards the head.

- Magellanic tapaculo, Scytalopus magellanicus (Ex)

== Ovenbirds ==
Order: Passeriformes Family: Furnariidae

Ovenbirds comprise a large family of small sub-oscine passerine bird species found in Central and South America. They are a diverse group of insectivores which gets its name from the elaborate "oven-like" clay nests built by some species, although others build stick nests or nest in tunnels or clefts in rock. The woodcreepers are brownish birds which maintain an upright vertical posture, supported by their stiff tail vanes. They feed mainly on insects taken from tree trunks.

- Buff-winged cinclodes, Cinclodes fuscus (V)
- Blackish cinclodes, Cinclodes antarcticus
- Thorn-tailed rayadito, Aphrastura spinicauda (U)

== Cotingas ==
Order: Passeriformes Family: Cotingidae

The cotingas are birds of forests or forest edges in tropical South America. Comparatively little is known about this diverse group, although all have broad bills with hooked tips, rounded wings, and strong legs. The males of many of the species are brightly coloured or decorated with plumes or wattles.

- Rufous-tailed plantcutter, Phytotoma rara (V)

== Tyrant flycatchers ==
Order: Passeriformes Family: Tyrannidae

Tyrant flycatchers are passerine birds which occur throughout North and South America. They superficially resemble the Old World flycatchers, but are more robust and have stronger bills. They do not have the sophisticated vocal capabilities of the songbirds. Most, but not all, have plain colouring. As the name implies, most are insectivorous.

- White-crested elaenia, Elaenia albiceps (V)
- Tufted tit-tyrant, Anairetes parulus (V)
- Great kiskadee, Pitangus sulphuratus (V)
- Cattle tyrant, Machetornis rixosus (V)
- Crowned slaty flycatcher, Empidonomus aurantioatrocristatus (V)
- Fork-tailed flycatcher, Tyrannus savana (V)
- Eastern kingbird, Tyrannus tyrannus (V)
- Vermilion flycatcher, Pyrocephalus rubinus (V)
- Austral negrito, Lessonia rufa (V)
- Dark-faced ground tyrant, Muscisaxicola maclovianus
- White-browed ground tyrant, Muscisaxicola albilora (V)
- Fire-eyed diucon, Pyrope pyrope (V)
- Black-crowned monjita, Neoxolmis coronatus (V)
- Black-billed shrike-tyrant, Agriornis montana (U)

== Swallows ==
Order: Passeriformes Family: Hirundinidae

The family Hirundinidae is adapted to aerial feeding. They have a slender streamlined body, long pointed wings, and a short bill with a wide gape. The feet are adapted to perching rather than walking, and the front toes are partially joined at the base.

- Blue-and-white swallow, Pygochelidon cyanoleuca (V)
- Tawny-headed swallow, Alopochelidon fucata (U)
- Southern rough-winged swallow, Stelgidopteryx ruficollis (V)
- Brown-chested martin, Progne tapera (U)
- Purple martin, Progne subis (V)
- Grey-breasted martin, Progne chalybea (V)
- Southern martin, Progne elegans (V)
- White-rumped swallow, Tachycineta leucorrhoa (U)
- Chilean swallow, Tachycineta leucopyga
- Bank swallow, Riparia riparia (V)
- Barn swallow, Hirundo rustica
- American cliff swallow, Petrochelidon pyrrhonota (V)

== Wrens ==
Order: Passeriformes Family: Troglodytidae

The wrens are mainly small and inconspicuous except for their loud songs. These birds have short wings and thin down-turned bills. Several species often hold their tails upright. All are insectivorous.

- Southern house wren, Troglodytes musculus (V)
- Cobb's wren, Troglodytes cobbi (E)
- Grass wren, Cistothorus platensis

== Thrushes ==
Order: Passeriformes Family: Turdidae

The thrushes are a group of passerine birds that occur mainly in the Old World. They are plump, soft plumaged, small to medium-sized insectivores or sometimes omnivores, often feeding on the ground. Many have attractive songs.

- Wood thrush, Hylocichla mustelina (V)
- Austral thrush, Turdus falcklandii
- Creamy-bellied thrush, Turdus amaurochalinus (V)

== Mockingbirds ==
Order: Passeriformes Family: Mimidae

The mimids are a family of passerine birds that includes thrashers, mockingbirds, tremblers, and the New World catbirds. These birds are notable for their complex songs, especially their ability to mimic a wide variety of birds and other sounds heard outdoors. Their colouring tends towards dull greys and browns.

- Patagonian mockingbird, Mimus patagonicus (V)
- White-banded mockingbird, Mimus triurus (V)

== Starlings ==
Order: Passeriformes Family: Sturnidae

Starlings are small to medium-sized passerine birds. Their flight is strong and direct and they are very gregarious. Their preferred habitat is fairly open country. They eat insects and fruit. Plumage is typically dark with a metallic sheen.

- Common starling, Sturnus vulgaris (introduced to the mainland) (V)

== Old World sparrows ==
Order: Passeriformes Family: Passeridae

Sparrows are small passerine birds. In general, sparrows tend to be small, plump, brown or grey birds with short tails and short powerful beaks. Sparrows are seed eaters, but they also consume small insects.

- House sparrow, Passer domesticus (I)

== Pipits and wagtails ==
Order: Passeriformes Family: Motacillidae

Motacillidae is a family of small passerine birds with medium to long tails which includes the wagtails, longclaws, and pipits. They are slender ground-feeding insectivores of open country.

- Correndera pipit, Anthus correndera

== Finches ==
Order: Passeriformes Family: Fringillidae

Finches are seed-eating passerine birds, that are small to moderately large and have a strong beak, usually conical and in some species very large. All have twelve tail feathers and nine primaries. These birds have a bouncing flight with alternating bouts of flapping and gliding on closed wings, and most sing well.

- Black-chinned siskin, Spinus barbata

== New World sparrows ==
Order: Passeriformes Family: Passerellidae

Most of the species are known as sparrows, but these birds are not closely related to the Old World sparrows which are in the family Passeridae. Many of these have distinctive head patterns.

- Grassland sparrow, Ammodramus humeralis (U)
- Rufous-collared sparrow, Zonotrichia capensis (V)

== Icterids ==
Order: Passeriformes Family: Icteridae

The icterids are a group of small to medium-sized, often colourful, passerine birds restricted to the New World and include the grackles, New World blackbirds, and New World orioles. Most species have black as the predominant plumage colour, often enlivened by yellow, orange, or red.

- Long-tailed meadowlark, Leistes loyca
- Shiny cowbird, Molothrus bonariensis (V)
- Yellow-winged blackbird, Agelasticus thilius (V)

== New World warblers ==
Order: Passeriformes Family: Parulidae

The New World warbler are a group of small, often colourful, passerine birds restricted to the New World. Most are arboreal, but some are terrestrial. Most members of this family are insectivores.

- American redstart, Setophaga ruticilla (V)
- Tropical parula, Setophaga pitiayumi (V)

== Tanagers ==
Order: Passeriformes Family: Thraupidae

The tanagers are a large group of small to medium-sized passerine birds restricted to the New World, mainly in the tropics. Many species are brightly coloured. As a family they are omnivorous, but individual species specialise in eating fruit, seeds, insects, or other types of food. Most have short, rounded wings.

- Patagonian yellow finch, Sicalis lebruni (U)
- Grassland yellow finch, Sicalis luteola (V)
- Patagonian sierra finch, Phrygilus patagonicus (V)
- Mourning sierra finch, Phrygilus fruticeti (V)
- White-bridled finch, Melanodera melanodera
- Yellow-bridled finch, Melanodera xanthogramma (Ex)
- Double-collared seedeater, Sporophila caerulescens (V)
- Diuca finch, Diuca diuca (V)

== See also ==
- List of birds
- Lists of birds by region
