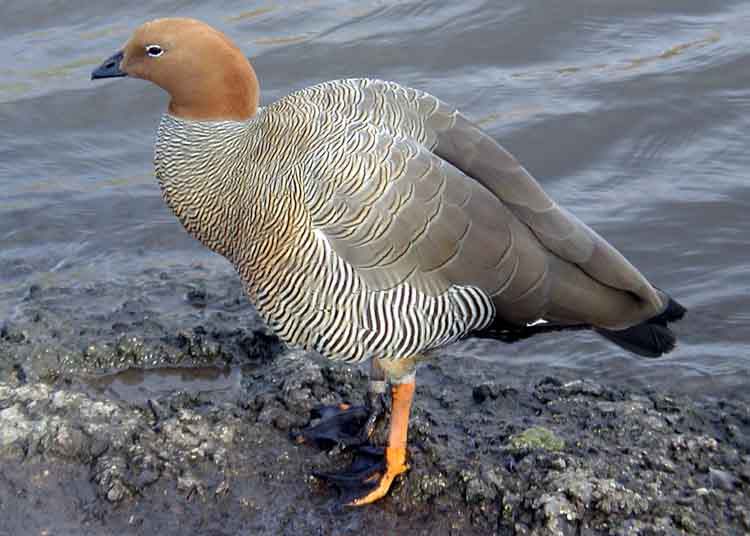
- Ruddy-headed goose, Chloephaga rubidiceps

Scientific classification
- Kingdom: Animalia
- Phylum: Chordata
- Class: Aves
- Order: Anseriformes
- Family: Anatidae
- Subfamily: Anatinae
- Genus: Chloephaga; Eyton, 1838

Type species
- Anas magellanica = Anas leucoptera Gmelin, JF 1789

Species
- Chloephaga melanoptera; Chloephaga picta; Chloephaga hybrida; Chloephaga poliocephala; Chloephaga rubidiceps

= Chloephaga =

Sheldgoose

Genus of birds

Chloephaga is a genus of sheldgeese in the family Anatidae. Other sheldgeese are found in the genera Alopochen and Neochen.

== Taxonomy ==
The genus Chloephaga was introduced in 1838 by the English naturalist Thomas Campbell Eyton in his A Monograph on the Anatidae, or Duck Tribe. He designated the type species as Chloephaga magellanica. This is Anas magellanica Gmelin, JF 1789, which is a synonym of Anas leucoptera Gmelin, JF 1789. Anas leucoptera is now considered as a subspecies of the upland goose Chloephaga picta leucoptera. The genus name comes from the combination of the Ancient Greek khloē meaning "grass" with -phagos meaning "-eating".

A molecular phylogenetic study by Mariana Bulgarella and collaborators published in 2014 found that the Orinoco goose in the monotypic genus Neochen, was embedded in the genus Chloephaga:

- - - Orinoco goose (Neochen jubata)
    - Andean goose (Chloephaga melanoptera)
  - - - Ashy-headed goose (Chloephaga poliocephala)
      - Ruddy-headed goose (Chloephaga rubidiceps)
    - - Upland goose (Chloephaga picta)
      - Kelp goose (Chloephaga hybrida)

Based on this result, some authorities place the Orinoco goose together with the Andean goose in the resurrected genus Oressochen.

A fossilized partial coracoid (CTES-PZ 7797) of an indeterminate Chloephaga species sharing some characters with the extant upland goose is known from the upper Pleistocene Toropí Formation (also called the Yupoí Formation) in Corrientes Province, Argentina, 700 kilometers further north than the northernmost present-day record of the genus.

== Species ==
The genus contains five species.

Genus Chloephaga – Eyton, 1838 – five species
Common name	Scientific name and subspecies	Range	Size and ecology	IUCN status and estimated population
Andean goose	Chloephaga melanoptera (Eyton, 1838)	Peru to south Chile and Argentina	Size: Habitat: Diet:	LC
Upland goose or Magellan goose Male Female	Chloephaga picta (Gmelin,, 1789) two subspecies: C. p. picta (Gmelin, 1789), C. p. leucoptera (Gmelin, 1789),	southernmost South America	Size: Habitat: Diet:	LC
Kelp goose Male Female	Chloephaga hybrida (Molina, 1782) two subspecies: C. h. hybrida (Molina, 1782); C. h. malvinarum (Phillips, 1916)	Chile's southern half to the eastern tip of Tierra del Fuego and the Falkland Islands	Size: Habitat: Diet:	LC
Ashy-headed goose	Chloephaga poliocephala P.L. Sclater, 1857	southernmost South America	Size: Habitat: Diet:	LC
Ruddy-headed goose	Chloephaga rubidiceps Sclater, PL, 1861	Tierra del Fuego, Chile and the Falkland Islands and southern Argentina	Size: Habitat: Diet:	LC
