= Neochen barbadiana =

Neochen barbadiana Temporal range: Late Pleistocene

Scientific classification
- Kingdom: Animalia
- Phylum: Chordata
- Class: Aves
- Order: Anseriformes
- Family: Anatidae
- Genus: Neochen
- Species: N. barbadiana

Binomial name
- Neochen barbadiana (Brodkorb, 1965)

Extinct species of bird

Neochen barbadiana is an extinct species of goose from the Late Pleistocene of Barbados. The species was described by American paleontologist Pierce Brodkorb from fossils found in Ragged Point, Saint Philip. This was the third fossil species of the genus to be described after Neochen pugil and N. debilis from Brazil and Argentina, respectively.
