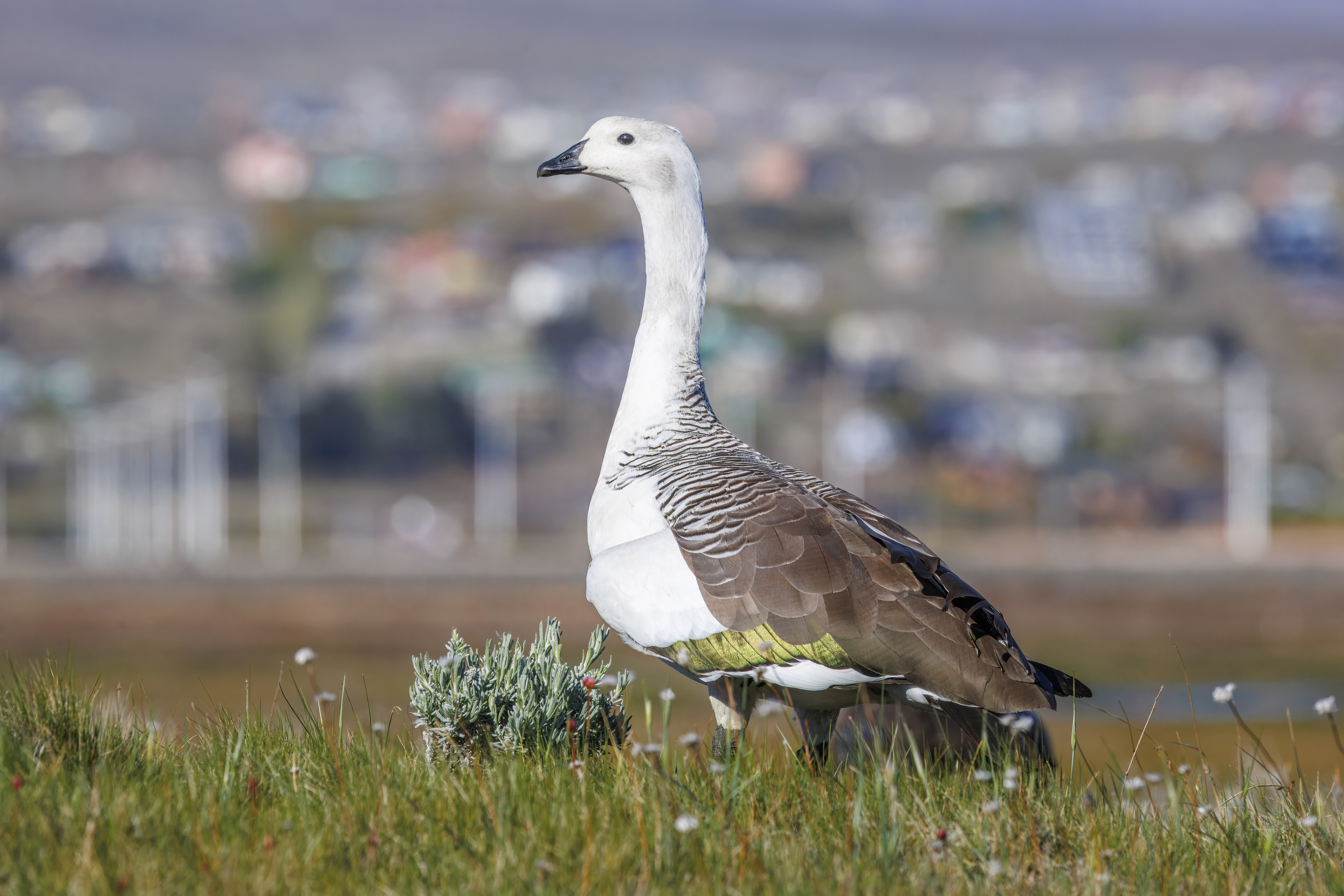
- Male, Argentina
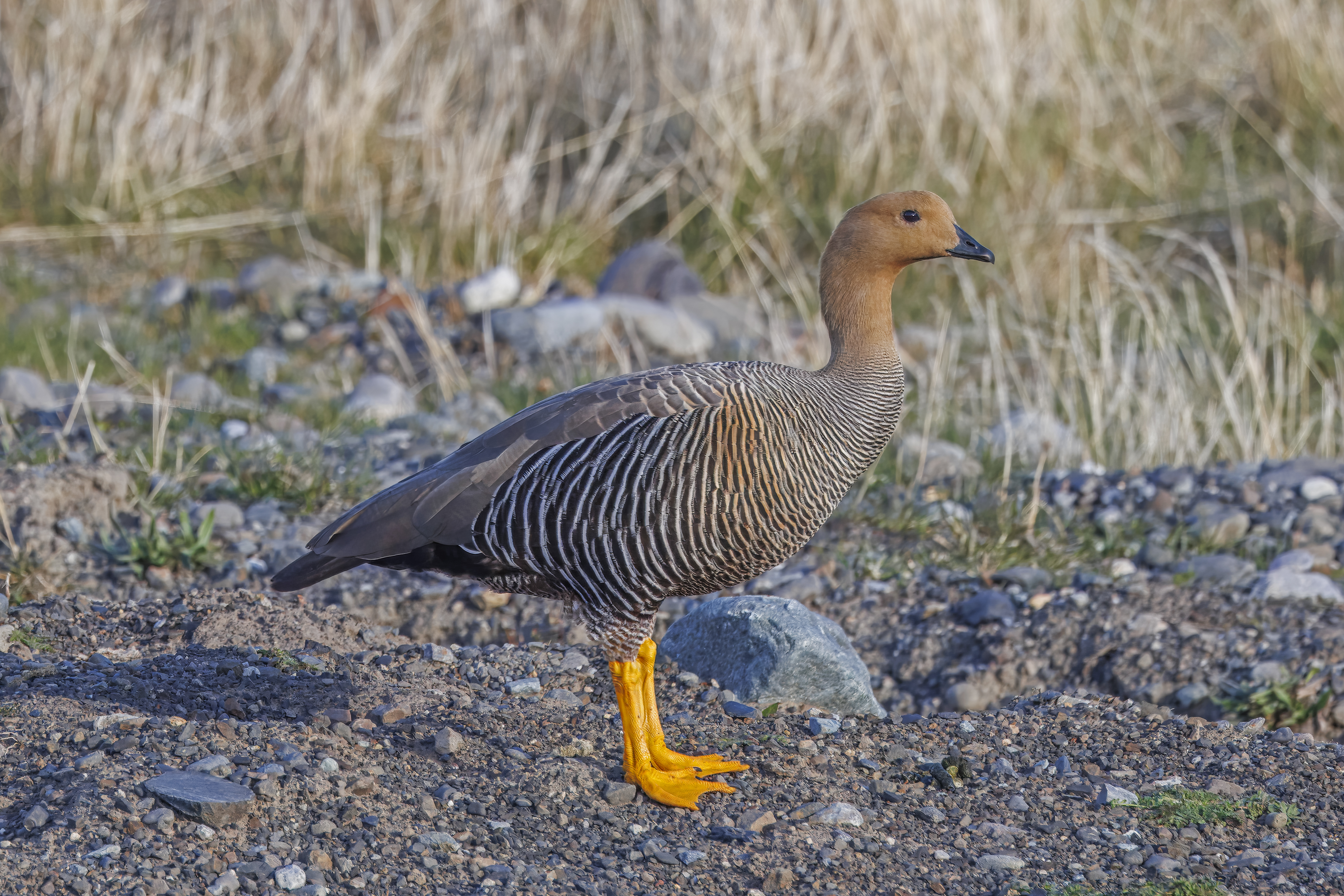
- Female, Chile both C. p. picta

Conservation status
- Least Concern (IUCN 3.1)

Scientific classification
- Kingdom: Animalia
- Phylum: Chordata
- Class: Aves
- Order: Anseriformes
- Family: Anatidae
- Genus: Chloephaga
- Species: C. picta

Binomial name
- Chloephaga picta (Gmelin, 1789)

Subspecies
- C. p. picta (Gmelin, 1789), (lesser Magellan goose); C. p. leucoptera (Gmelin, 1789), (greater Magellan goose)
- Non-Breeding Year-round Breeding

Synonyms
- Foetopterus ambiguus Moreno & Mercerat, 1891

= Upland goose =

Species of bird

The upland goose or Magellan goose (Chloephaga picta) is a sheldgoose of the shelduck-sheldgoose subfamily of the Anatidae, the biological family that includes the ducks and most duck-like waterfowl such as the geese and swans. Sheldgeese resemble true geese and display similar habits, yet they are more closely related to shelducks and ducks.

This species nests and breeds close to water (rivers, ponds, oceans) either on the ground or near it among vegetation, usually in grasslands or coastal meadows in the Falkland Islands or in southern Patagonia and Tierra del Fuego at the beginning of the austral summer. Population estimates suggest the insular subpopulations are stable, but continental populations show a recent decline in abundance. Upland geese are herbivorous, specializing in plant leaves, stems and seeds.

== Taxonomy ==
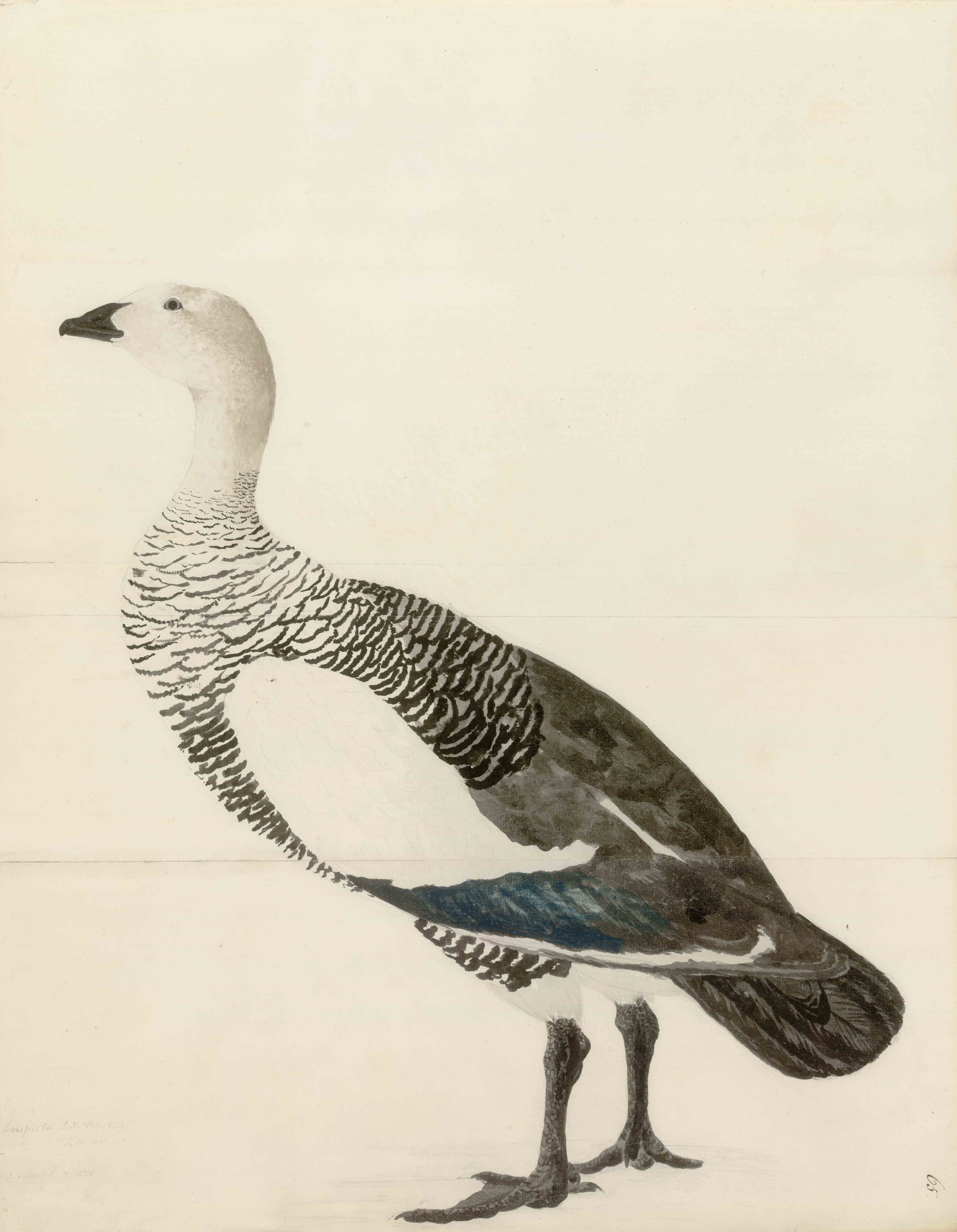
Watercolour of a male bird made by Georg Forster on James Cook's second voyage to the Pacific Ocean. This picture is the holotype for the species.

The upland goose was formally described in 1789 by the German naturalist Johann Friedrich Gmelin in his revised and expanded edition of Carl Linnaeus's Systema Naturae. He placed it with the other ducks, geese and swans in the genus Anas and coined the binomial name Anas picta. Gmelin based his description on the "painted goose" that had been included by the English ornithologist John Latham in his A General Synopsis of Birds. The species had been observed in 1775 on Isla de los Estados during Captain James Cook's second voyage to the Pacific Ocean. The naturalist Joseph Banks had provided Latham with a water-colour drawing of the goose by Georg Forster, who had accompanied Cook. It is the holotype for the species and is held by the Natural History Museum in London. The upland goose is now placed with four other species in the genus Chloephaga that was introduced in 1838 by the English naturalist Thomas Campbell Eyton. The genus name comes from the Ancient Greek khloē, meaning "grass" and -phagos, meaning "-eating". The specific epithet picta is from the Latin pictus, meaning "painted.

There are strong morphological and genetic similarities between the bird fauna of the Falkland Islands and the Southern Cone of South America, and most native bird species are usually present in both insular and continental populations. The biogeography of the region suggests that these similarities exist because in the geological past, birds from the continent might have reached the Falkland Islands either across a former land connection, during periods of lowered sea levels, or through long-distance dispersal. Genetic analyses place the Magellan goose as a sister taxa to the kelp goose.

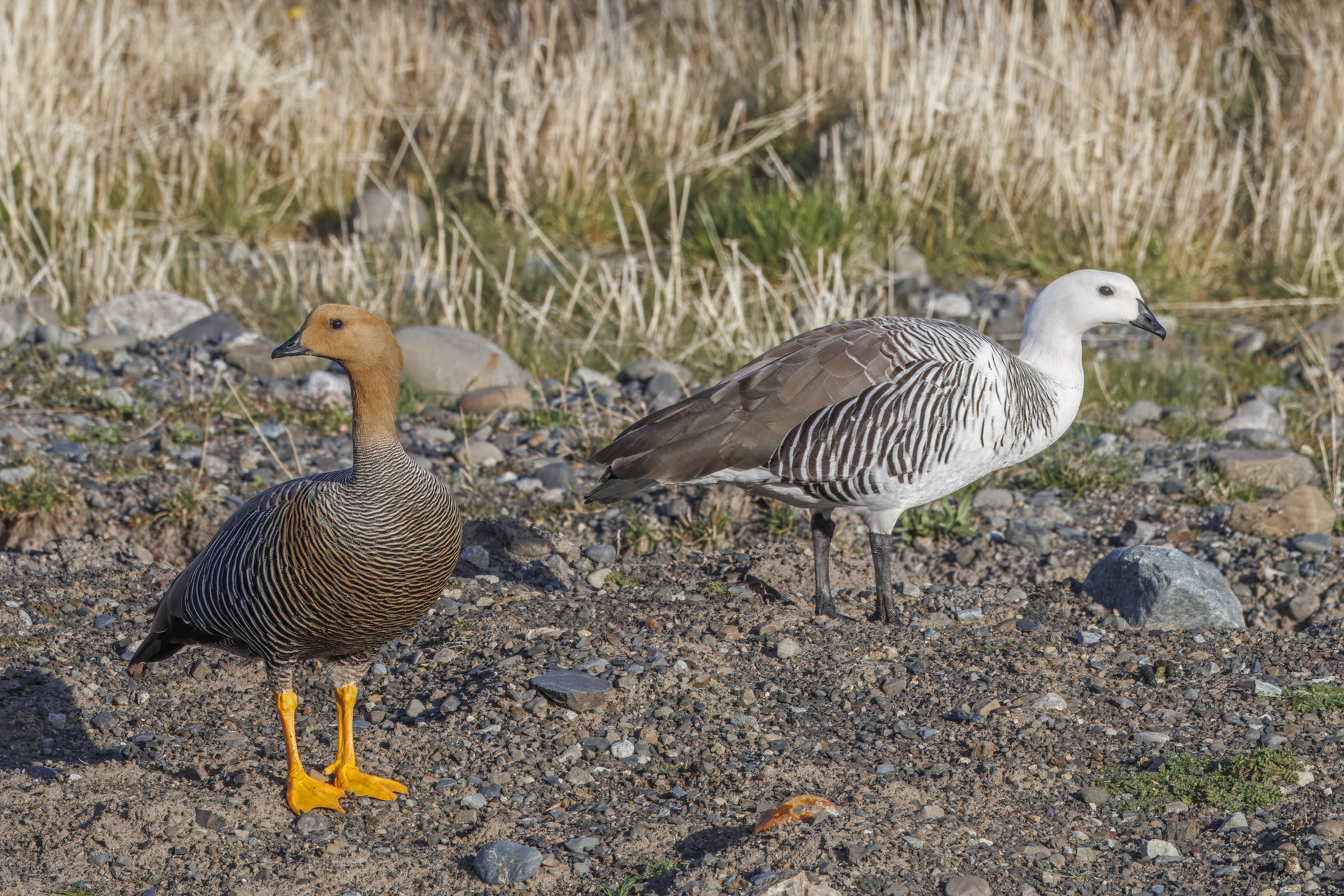
C. p. picta female (left)
Torres del Paine, Chile

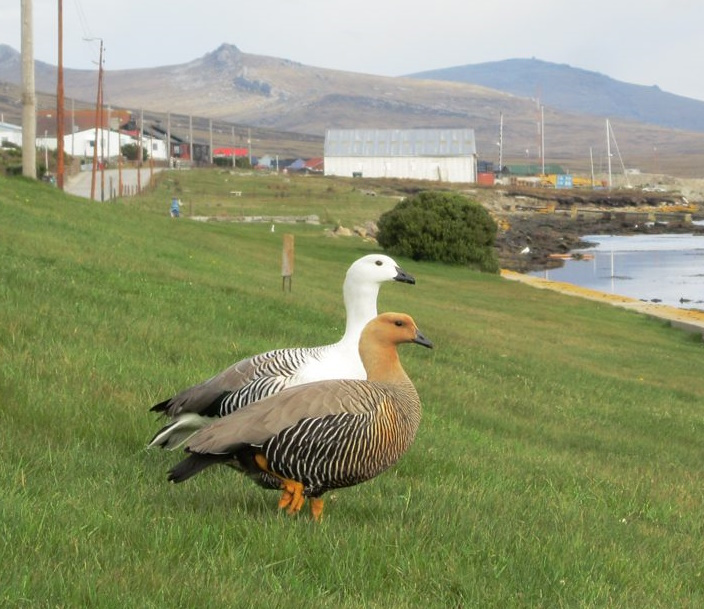
C. p. leucoptera, female (front)
Stanley, Falkland Islands

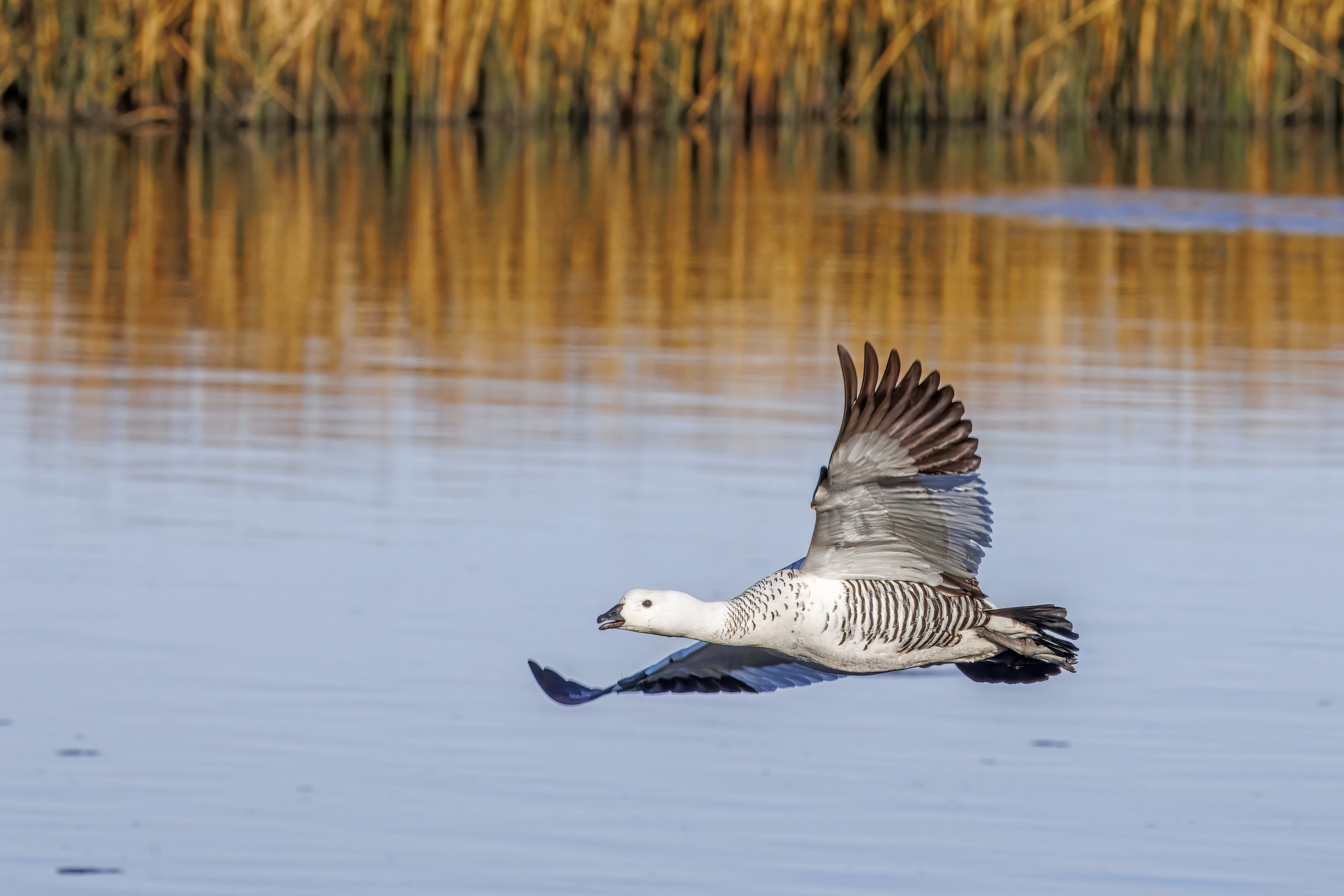
C. p. picta male

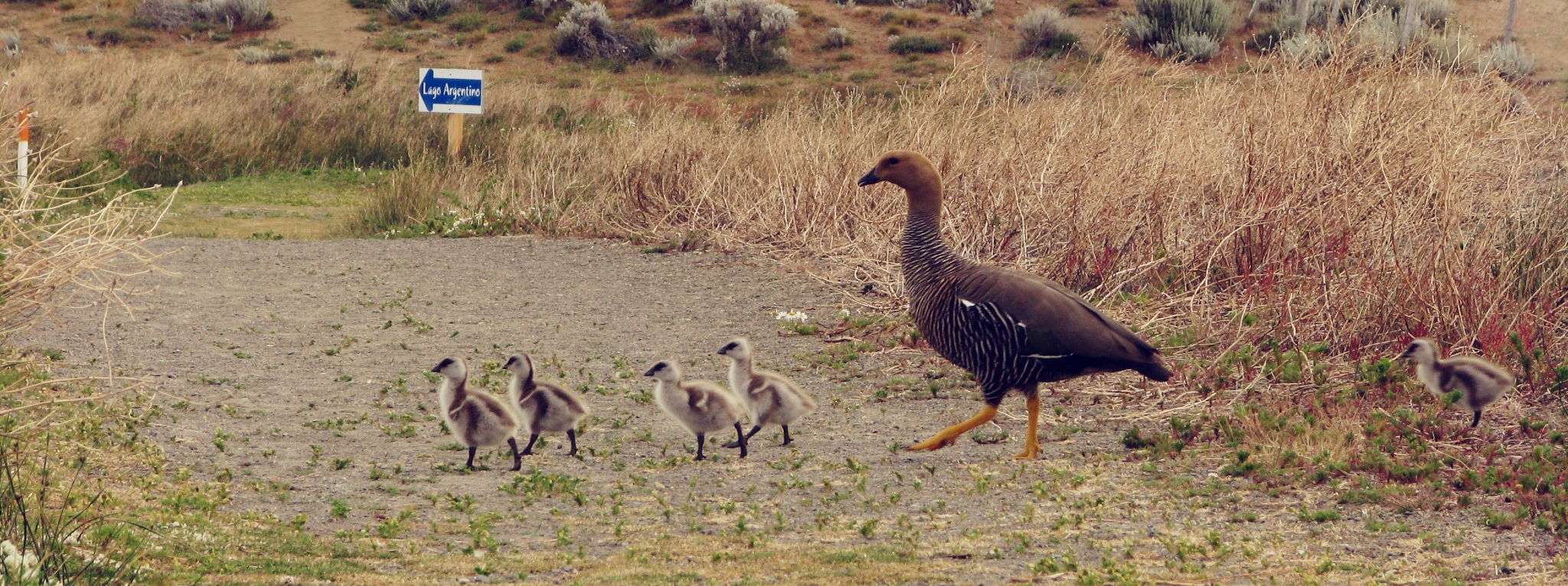
C. p. picta female with chicks

=== Subspecies ===
Two subspecies of upland goose are recognised. The smaller mainland form, C. p. picta, also known as the lesser Magellan goose, is found from central Chile and south-central Argentina south to Tierra del Fuego. The larger insular form, C. p. leucoptera or greater Magellan goose, is indigenous to the Falkland Islands, located to the east of the southern part of South America.

== Description ==
Upland geese males are similar to other sheldgeese, notably the kelp goose (Chloephaga hybrida) due to their predominantly white plumage, while females resemble the ruddy-headed goose (C. rubidiceps) due to their similarly barred breast plumage. This species is 60–72.5 centimetres (23.6–28.5 in) long.

Greater Magellan geese (leucoptera subspecies) are the largest birds of the genus Chloephaga. Males typically weigh 3.5–4.5 kg (7.7–9.9 lbs) and females range from 2.9 to 3.5 kg (6.4–7.7 lbs). Lesser Magellan geese (picta subspecies) males weigh 2.7–3.6 kg (6.0–7.9 lbs) on average and females 2.9–3.5 kg (6.4–6.8 lbs).

Upland geese display strong sexual dimorphism in their plumage. Males have white heads and breast plumage with black legs, whereas females have reddish-brown heads and breast plumage with yellow-orange legs. However, two interbreeding morphs exist for males. One morph causes black-barred breast plumage while the other causes white breast plumage. A greenish-bronze speculum is also located on the inner secondary flight feathers of the adult male. Males make a whistling "wheep" sound, while females make a low, rattling "a-rrr" sound.

Upland geese molt both their primary and secondary feathers in ponds or sheltered sea inlets, usually between late November and early January. Molting frequency depends on breeding success to some degree, since most adults that molt have either not yet mated or failed to breed. Some greater Magellan geese skip this molt, retaining their ability to fly during the austral summer. While unusual, skipping this important process might have energetic advantages, since molting season can be very nutritionally taxing.

In Chapter VI of On the Origin of Species, author Charles Darwin noted that the upland goose has webbing between its toes that appeared to be "rudimentary in function, though not in structure", and concluded that this was a vestigial anatomical feature in this bird.

== Habitat and distribution ==
=== Habitat ===
Upland geese usually live in small, scattered groups on most pasture types (temperate grasslands, arid lowland scrubs), favouring areas with short green grasses. However, recent land use changes towards crop fields and managed pastures have forced them to adapt to and colonize such modern landscapes.

=== Distribution ===
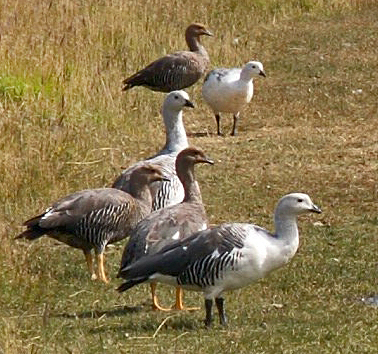
In Santa Cruz Province, Argentina

Upland geese occupy the southern South American Continent (southern and central Chile and Argentina) and the Falkland Islands, with a continental distribution ranging from central Chile/southern Argentina to Tierra del Fuego, near Antarctica. Lesser Magellan geese usually reside in Patagonia or southern Chile and migrate north during the winter towards central Argentina, to their wintering grounds. Southernmost populations are more likely to migrate, with migrants reaching flight speeds of over 40 km/h (25 mph). In 2013, researchers identified a lesser Magellan goose in southern Brazil, redefining the northern edge of their wintering grounds. Greater Magellan geese, however, do not migrate and rarely leave the Falkland Islands. In general, population densities are highest around ponds and in green grasslands. Computer modelling of population ranges suggests that their distribution is favoured by the ample presence of green grasses to feed and breed in, and hindered by human presence, notably urbanization and oil extraction. There is also a sizeable introduced population on the sub-Antarctic South Georgia Island.

== Behaviour and ecology ==
=== Breeding ===
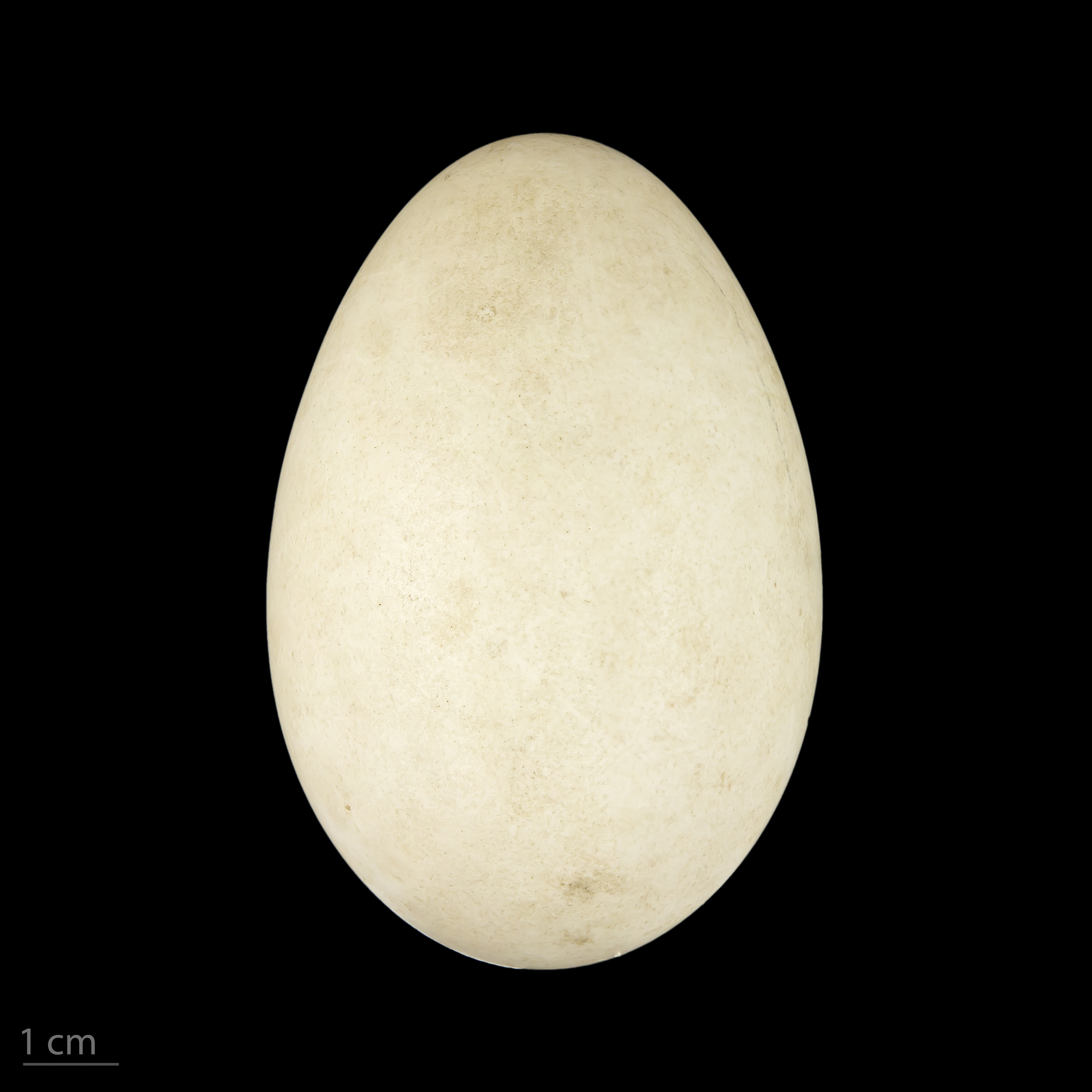
Egg in the collection of the Muséum de Toulouse

Upland goose breed in southern Patagonia or their native islands during the austral summer. They are monogamous, although divorce can occur, and generally return to breed in the same territory every year. After approximately two years from birth, females can start to lay eggs, and usually do so near their birthplace. Males begin breeding later and tend to settle farther away from where they were born. This sexual difference in dispersal distances causes the sex ratio of young to become biased towards the dispersing sex due to the inherent resource constraints of crowding. Therefore, upland geese tend to display a male-biased sex ratio. They breed non-colonially in densely vegetated areas, generally in September and October on the mainland, and in November on the Falkland Islands. A large population of this species breeds in the New Island Nature Reserve, which was created in collaboration with Falkland Conservation.

Males attract females through a courtship display in which they whistle loudly, to which the female responds with softer cackles. As they are monogamous and territorial, a violent fight may break out if a male encroaches on another's territory. Males have been found injured or dead after these fights.

The simple nest is either on the ground or within 1.5 m (5 ft) of it, usually concealed by dense vegetation, and often located near water. A clutch consists of 5–8 eggs which are incubated for about 1 month. When the chicks hatch, they are covered in greyish-brown down. They don't remain in the nest for more than a day, quickly going to a nearby water source or feeding area, and are able to feed themselves from birth. They fledge in 9–10 weeks and reach maturity in 3 years.

=== Food and feeding ===
The upland goose is primarily a herbivore, feeding mostly of seeds, leaves, stems, and other plant matter. They are very gregarious, and flocks of thousands of birds can be found grazing in one pasture alone. They are considered pests by farmers due to the fact that they eat on the pastures that are used for cattle and sheep, and because they claim that upland geese significantly decrease crop yield. However, a recent study claims that while sheldgeese do reduce wheat cover, they do not reduce overall wheat yield and they might even provide an ecosystem service through weed grazing.

=== Threats and conservation ===
In the early 20th century, the Argentinian government declared the three Patagonian sheldgeese species (Ruddy-headed goose, Ashy-headed goose, and Upland goose) as pests due to claims of excessive grazing and negative effects on crop yields. Since then, wildlife agencies have encouraged hunting of upland geese across the entirety of their range and without restrictions on the number of birds killed. Consequently, population surveys started suggesting continental populations were declining. In 2008, all three species were classified as endangered by the Argentine government and hunting was banned, although some poaching still occurs, mostly on the mainland. Recently, fox predation has drastically reduced population numbers on the mainland, so national governments have established several protected areas throughout Patagonia in an attempt to conserve the species.
