= Wingegyps =

Wingegyps Temporal range: Late Pleistocene (Ensenadan-Lujanian) ~0.126–0.012 Ma

Scientific classification
- Kingdom: Animalia
- Phylum: Chordata
- Class: Aves
- Order: Accipitriformes
- Family: Cathartidae
- Genus: †Wingegyps; Alvarenga & Olson 2004
- Species: †W. cartellei

Binomial name
- †Wingegyps cartellei Alvarenga & Olson 2004

Extinct genus of birds

Wingegyps is an extinct genus of small condor from the Late Pleistocene of South America. The type species W. cartellei was described from cave deposits in the states of Bahia and Minas Gerais, Brazil, with more material having been found in the Mene de Inciarte tar seeps of Venezuela. The material was first discovered in the mid 19th century and eventually described by Danish ornithologist Oluf Winge, for whom it was later named, without initially attributing a new scientific name. While it is regarded as the smallest known New World Vulture, the anatomy of the cranium suggests that it was actually related to condors such as Vultur and Gymnogyps, particularly the latter. The precise ecology of Wingegyps is unclear, but it has been suggested that it could have potentially fed on fruit or scraps from carcasses to avoid competition with larger, more powerful vultures.

== History and naming ==
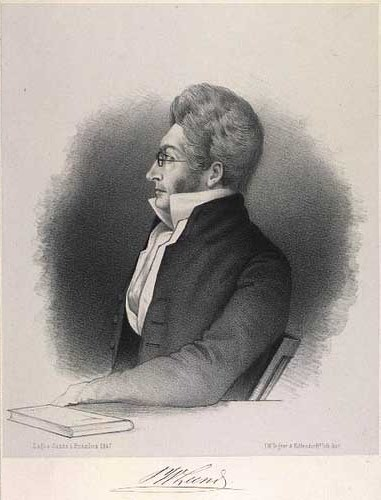
Peter Wilhelm Lund, who discovered the first Wingegyps remains.

The first remains now assigned to Wingegyps were discovered by Danish scientist Peter Wilhelm Lund after his move to Brazil. During his residence in the country from 1832 to his death in 1880 Lund collected a multitude of fossil remains from the state of Minas Gerais, ranging from mammal megafauna to assorted bird bones. Between 1835 and 1849 Winge sent masses of fossil material back to his birth country of Denmark, where they would be studied by the brothers Herluf and Oluf Winge. While Herluf Winge described the mammal remains sent to him, Oluf instead focused on the birds, eventually publishing a list on them in 1888. While Winge referred many of the fossils to extant taxa, bones he deemed to represent distinct new forms were largely left unnamed. This includes a type of New World vulture from Lapa do Tiu represented by the distal end of an upper arm bone and an ulna missing its distal end.

The Lapa do Tiu vulture was mentioned occasionally throughout the next 115 years, though it went under several names in that time period. In 1933 Lambrecht mentioned the humerus described by Winge as an indetermined genus and species of cathartid vulture, literally "Cathartidarum gen. sp. indet.", using the same terminology for entirely unrelated vulture remains from France as well. In a 1944 publication Fisher however missinterpreted this terminology as a generic name, describing Winge's vulture as Cathartidarum while regarding it as a close relative to the modern king vulture, likely based on a missinterpretation of another paper. The name Cathartidarum was then later also used by Tordoff as well as by authors reusing Fisher's phylogenetic tree.

Despite being recognized to represent a new form and the occasional mentions of the material, no further detailed studies were published on Winge's vulture in the subsequent 115 years. Eventually, researchers discovered other vulture remains in Pleistocene or early Holocene cave deposits of Gruta dos Brejões Bahia, Brazil, specifically a well preserved cranium and two humeri. After initial difficulties in classifying the animal, comparison with the fossil remains of Gymnogyps amplus from Rancho La Brea saw the animal identified as a condor and further comparison was made with the fossil material described by Winge in 1888. Researchers Herculano M. F. Alvarenga and Storrs L. Olson remarked that the less complete Bahia humerus was identical to that illustrated by Winge and coined the new genus and species Wingegyps cartellei with the cranium serving as the holotype. While the name Cathartidarum as used by Fisher would technically predate the name Wingegyps, the context in which the name was first used led to it being considered invalid by the ICZN.

Remains of Wingegyps were also recovered from the Late Pleistocene Mene de Inciarte tar seeps in Venezuela, which were regarded as an undescribed species by Steadman and colleagues in 2015.

Wingegyps is named for Oluf Winge and his early recognition of the distinct nature of the fossil material sent to him by Lund. The second part of the name is "gyps", Greek for "vulture", while the species name honors Brazilian paleontologist Castor Cartelle, who excavated fossil material at the site where the holotype was discovered.

== Description ==
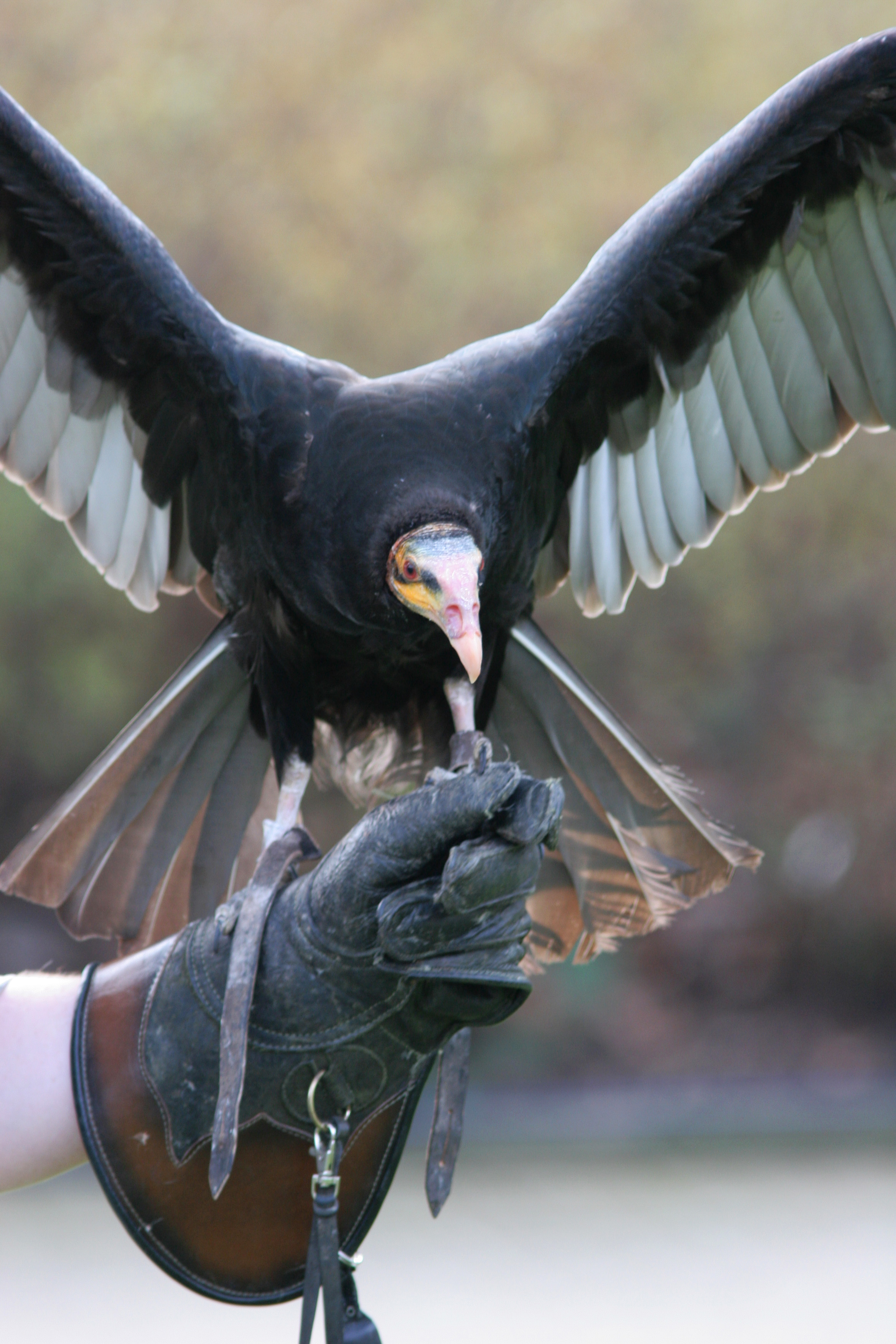
Despite being most closely related to condors, Wingegyps was smaller than even the lesser yellow-headed vulture, the smallest extant New World vulture.

Like in modern condors the neurocranium of Wingegyps appears somewhat ovoid in top view due to its narrow shape and elongated nature. In this regard the skull of Wingegyps is most similar to that of Gymnogyps (the genus that includes today's Californian condor), though even narrower and remaining at this consistent width along its length rather than expanding towards the back of the head. To match this the muscle scars on either side of the cerebellar prominence, located at the back of the cranium, are likewise cranium. The foramen magnum opens entirely posteriorly rather than showing some degree of ventral deflection and the occipital condyle is visible in its entirety alongside its stalk when looking at the skull from the side, while in other condors it is either obscured entirely (as in Breagyps) or at least partially covered (as is the case in modern condors). The paroccipital processes also differ from their extant relatives, being angled more downward than in the genera Gymnogyps and Vultur.

The brachial depression of the ulna resembles modern condors and the king vulture in that its not as pneumatized as in smaller New-World vultures. Furthermore, the olecranon is more distinctly set apart from the edge of the internal cotyla like in the Andean condor, albeit narrower than in the modern species.

The feature most prominently highlighted regarding Wingegyps is its diminutive size. Alvarenga and Olson describe it as "much smaller than any known condor" and just smaller than the smallest modern New World vulture, the lesser yellow-headed vulture (Cathartes burrovianus). They also note that the humerus is only slightly shorter than that of a tropical female black vultures, however they not only highlight that more temperate populations are larger than their tropical counterparts but also that despite having shorter humeri black vultures are still notably larger than lesser yellow-headed vultures. Stucchi and Emslie more broadly describe Wingegyps as "no larger than a raven".

== Classification ==
Winge initially compared the bones that would later be assigned to Wingegyps to the modern black vulture (Coragyps atratus), which alongside the turkey and yellow-headed vultures of the genus Cathartes forms one of the two major extant branches of New World vultures. However, the morphology of the Bahia cranium instead suggests affinities with the other major extant branch which includes the Andean and Californian condor as well as several fossil forms. Alvarenga and Olson suggest an especially close relationship with the genus Gymnogyps. In their description of Wingegyps the team regards king vultures as being more closely related to smaller non-condor New World Vultures, which they further suggest to by possibly paraphyletic. Degrange and colleagues meanwhile consider king vultures to be an intermediate between vultures and condors, but not a true condor.

== Paleobiology ==
Remains of Wingegyps are known from Minas Gerais and Bahia in Brazil, though Alvarenga and Olson argue that the animal's range could have been much greater and that its small size could have led to it being mistaken for Coragyps or Cathartes in other fossil deposits. This would be somewhat proven correct by the latter discovery of Wingegyps remains from Venezuela. The current known range suggests that Wingegyps lived during the Late Pleistocene or Early Holocene, with radiocarbon dating of sloth coprolites from Gruta dos Brejões in Bahia suggesting an age of 12.200 years BP.

Modern New World vultures are mostly known for their scavenging behavior, with most members of the family such as condors, king and black vultures operating based on sight. Among these sight-based scavengers the large Californian and Andean vultures both prefer the soft parts of large carcasses while king and black vultures are notable for their aggressive behavior around cadavers, with the latter furthermore being known to extensively rip pieces of meat into smaller, more manageable pieces. Turkey vultures meanwhile operate based on smell, allowing them to find carcasses that are either obscured from the air or arriving sooner than their relatives while generally being less competitive.

Based on the behavior of modern New World vultures, Alvarenga and Olson speculate that the small size of Wingegyps would have made it difficult to compete with larger, more aggressive bird while their presumably visual foraging behavior shared with modern condors would mean that they would be beaten to the carcass by turkey vultures with their derived, well-developed sense of smell. The team instead proposes that Wingegyps may have acted more similar to some specialized Old World vultures, in particular the Egyptian vulture or palm-nut vulture. Egyptian vultures still participate in scavenging, but rather than aggressively fighting larger birds they pick up scraps left by more dominant and powerful scavengers. Palm-nut vultures meanwhile subsist mostly on the fruit of the African oil palm. While no modern New World vultures are as specialized in frugivory as palm-nut vultures, turkey vultures are known to both feed enough on the introduced oil palm fruit to be considered a "nuisance" while also making use of native species like Acrocomia sclerocarpa. While both of these nisches could explain the diminutive size of Wingegyps, Alvarenga and Olson favor the scavenging hypothesis, as Wingegyps seems to have gone extinct at around the same time as South America's megafauna and many other scavengers, whereas palm trees remain widespread until today.
