= Neochen pugil =

Neochen pugil Temporal range: Late Pleistocene to Early Holocene

Scientific classification
- Kingdom: Animalia
- Phylum: Chordata
- Class: Aves
- Order: Anseriformes
- Family: Anatidae
- Genus: Neochen
- Species: N. pugil

Binomial name
- Neochen pugil (Winge, 1887)

Synonyms
- Chenalopex pugil Winge, 1887

Extinct species of bird

Neochen pugil is an extinct species of goose from the Late Pleistocene or possibly the Early Holocene of Brazil. The fossils were discovered by Danish paleontologist Peter Wilhelm Lund near Lagoa Santa, Minas Gerais state, and described by Danish ornithologist Oluf Winge in 1887. It was related to the living Orinoco goose, but much larger. It has a notably large build in size compared to similar species of the same genus, having a slender, 13.5 centimeter on average long tarsometatarsus.
