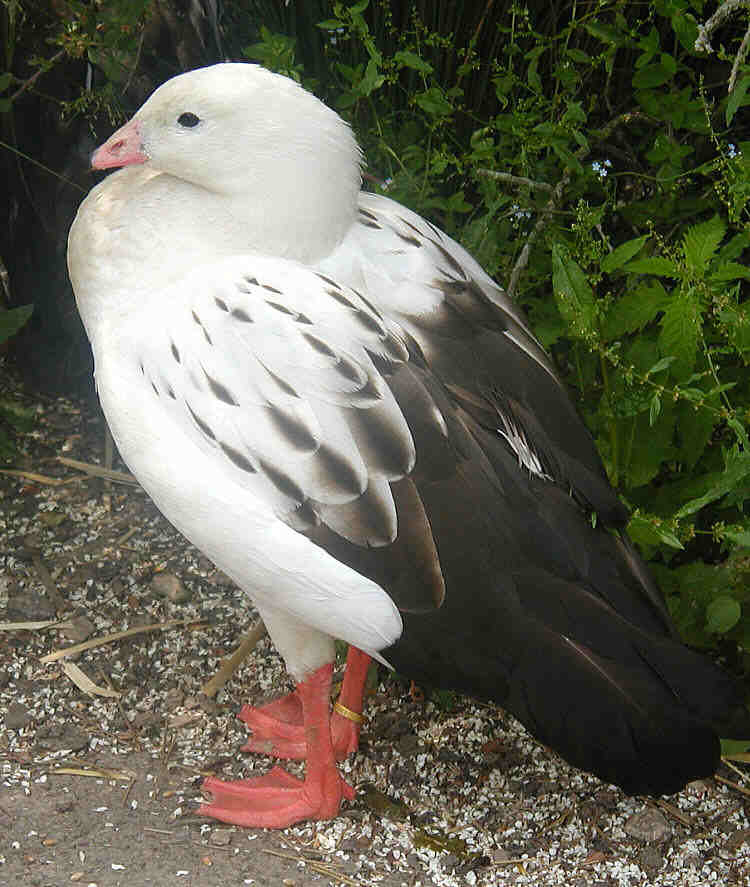

Conservation status
- Least Concern (IUCN 3.1)

Scientific classification
- Kingdom: Animalia
- Phylum: Chordata
- Class: Aves
- Order: Anseriformes
- Family: Anatidae
- Genus: Chloephaga
- Species: C. melanoptera

Binomial name
- Chloephaga melanoptera (Eyton, 1838)

Synonyms
- Oressochen melanopterus

= Andean goose =

Species of bird

The Andean goose (Chloephaga melanoptera) is a species of waterfowl in tribe Tadornini of subfamily Anserinae. It is found in Argentina, Bolivia, Chile, and Peru.

== Taxonomy and systematics ==
The Andean goose's taxonomy is unsettled. The International Ornithological Committee (IOC) and BirdLife International's Handbook of the Birds of the World (HBW) place it in genus Chloephaga with several other geese. However, based on a molecular phylogenetic study published in 2014, the South American Classification Committee of the American Ornithological Society and the Clements taxonomy place it and the Orinoco goose in the resurrected genus Oressochen. The IOC and HBW place the Orinoco goose in genus Neochen.

The Andean goose is monotypic.

== Description ==
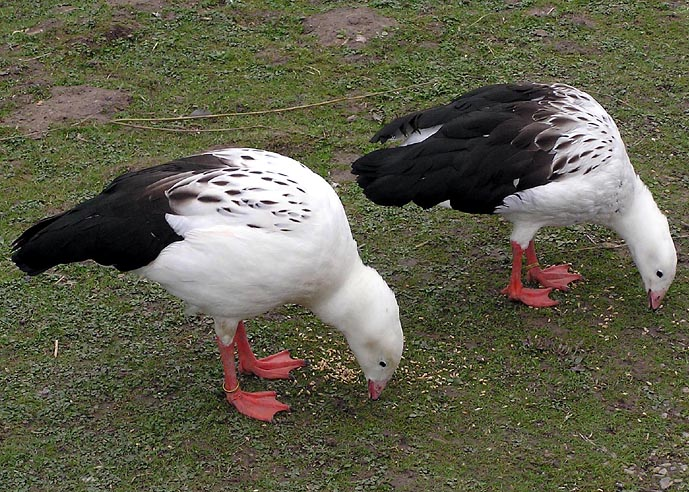
Andean geese feeding

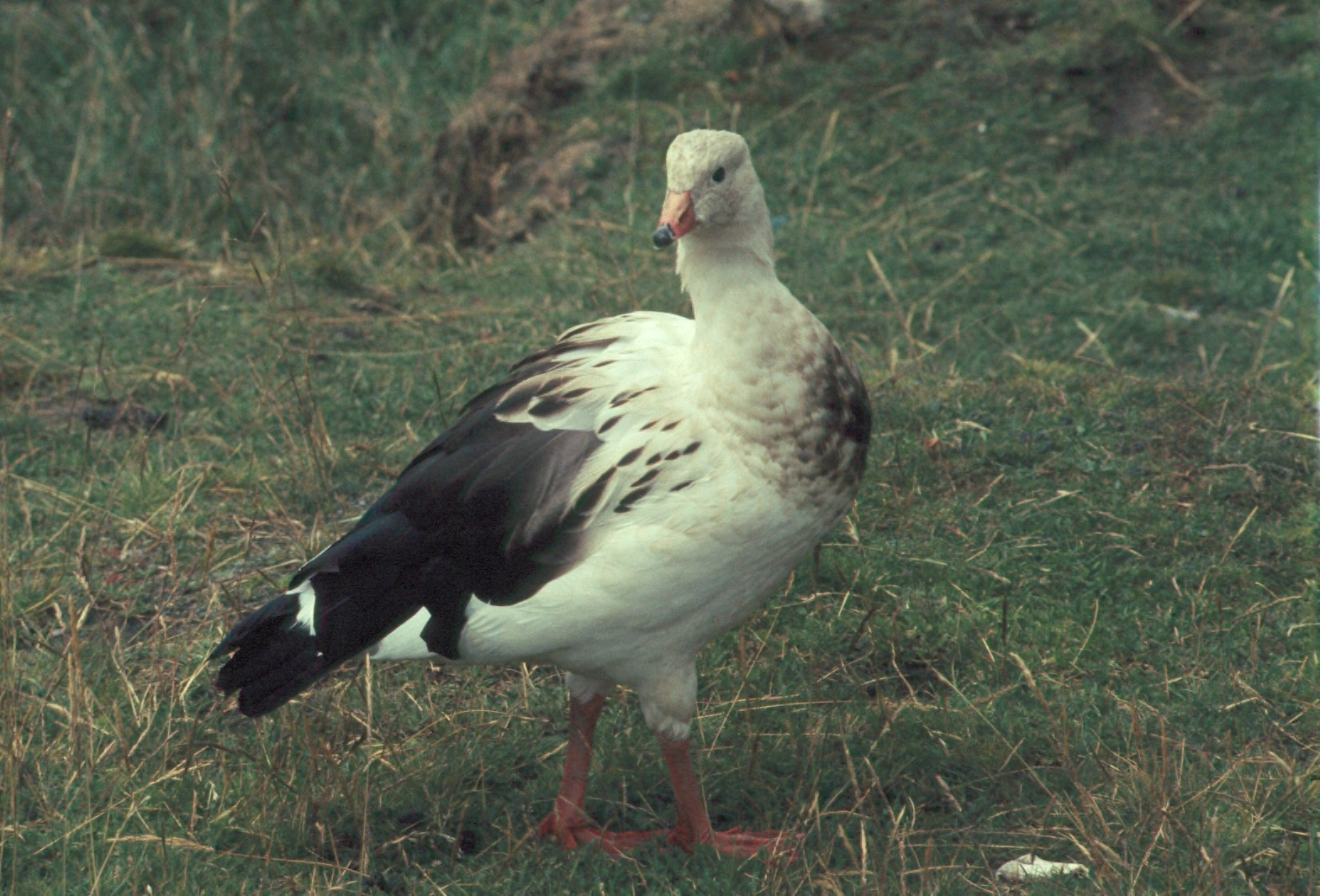
Andean goose walking in grass

The Andean goose is 70 to 76 cm (28 to 30 in) long and weighs 2.73 and 3.64 kg (6.0 and 8.0 lb). Both sexes have the same plumage. Adults' heads and bodies are white. Some scapulars have sooty centers and others are dark brown, giving a striped appearance to the shoulders. The wing's primaries and the tail are black with a greenish gloss. Their bill is coral red with a black nail and the legs and feet are light red. Downy young are mostly white with some blackish spots and streaks. Older immatures are similar to adults but duller. Their bodies are somewhat off-white, the sides of the head often partly gray, and the scapulars brownish gray.

== Distribution and habitat ==
The Andean goose is found from Peru's departments of Ancash and Junín south through western Bolivia to the Ñuble Region of Chile and in Argentina into Catamarca Province. It inhabits open grasslands, bogs, and the shores of lakes and lagoons. In elevation it is found almost entirely above 3,000 m (9,800 ft) but in Chile moves lower temporarily in times of heavy winter snow.

== Physiological adaptation ==
Andean geese have developed a mutation in their hemoglobin that has led to a vast increase in hemoglobin-oxygen affinity over that of lower-elevation species.

== Behavior ==
=== Movement ===
Except for temporary elevational changes, the Andean goose is a year-round resident throughout its range. They are almost entirely terrestrial but will fly to escape danger and will lead chicks into water to avoid predators.

=== Feeding ===
Almost nothing is known about the Andean goose's diet but it appears to be almost entirely grasses. They often form loose flocks except in the breeding season.

=== Breeding ===
Andean geese are territorial only in the breeding season, which begins in November, the austral spring. They are believed to form strong year-round pair bonds. They do not make a conventional nest but lay eggs in a scrape among sparse vegetation and sometimes on bare ground. The clutch size is five to ten eggs. Males guard females during the incubation period of about 30 days.

=== Vocalization ===
The Andean goose is very vocal, and males and females have very different voices. Males make "a "soft huit-wit-wit..., crip, quiop, [a] low, grunting kwwwwwu..., [a] single-syllable threat whistle, and double-syllable sexual calls." Females make a louder "somewhat grating kwa-kwak and "a hoarse gack-gack".

== Status ==
The IUCN has assessed the Andean goose as being of Least Concern. It has a very large range, and though its population size is unknown it is believed to be stable. No immediate threats have been identified. "The remote habitat of this species has protected it from human persecution [and it] is unlikely that the areas this goose uses will be modified by man in the near future." It is persecuted by sheep farmers who view it as a competitor to their flocks.
