= Oluf Winge =

Danish zoologist

Gustav Oluf Bang Winge (14 May 1855 Copenhagen – 16 February 1889) was a Danish zoologist.

== Biography ==
The older brother of the zoologist Herluf Winge, Oluf also had since childhood a great interest in animals. He took in 1881 the title of "Magisterkonferens" in Natural History and in 1883 became assistant at the Zoologisk Museum. He worked mainly with ornithology, such as the birds recovered from the lighthouses in Denmark and his most important work, "Fugle fra Knoglehuler i Brasilien" (1888), on the fossil birds discovered in the caves in of the state of Minas Gerais in Brazil by his compatriot paleontologist Peter Wilhelm Lund.

He died in 1889, 33 years old, from an "incurable breast suffering".

The Pleistocene condor genus Wingegyps is named after him.
