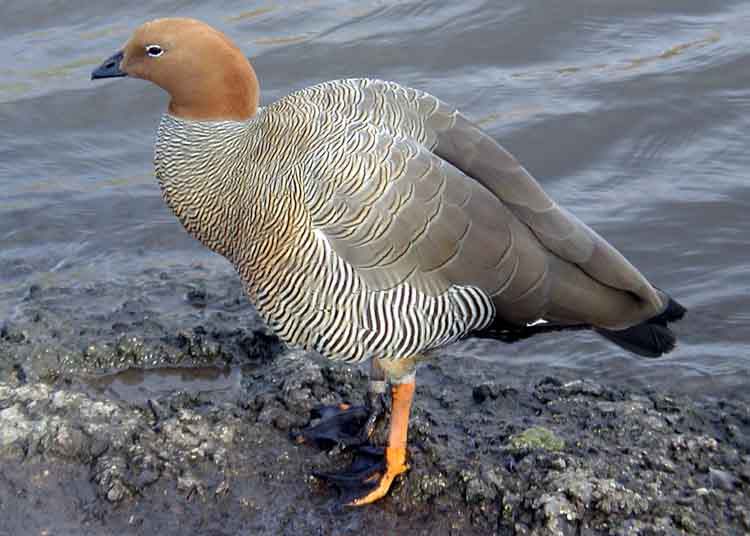

Conservation status
- Least Concern (IUCN 3.1)

Scientific classification
- Kingdom: Animalia
- Phylum: Chordata
- Class: Aves
- Order: Anseriformes
- Family: Anatidae
- Genus: Chloephaga
- Species: C. rubidiceps

Binomial name
- Chloephaga rubidiceps Sclater, PL, 1861

= Ruddy-headed goose =

Species of bird

The ruddy-headed goose (Chloephaga rubidiceps) is a species of waterfowl in tribe Tadornini of subfamily Anserinae. It is found in Argentina, Chile, and the Falkland Islands.

== Taxonomy and systematics ==
The ruddy-headed goose is monotypic.

== Description ==
The ruddy-headed goose is 45 to 52.5 cm (18 to 21 in) long. It is the smallest of the South American sheldgeese of genus Chloephaga, with males weighing 1.65 to 2.02 kg (3.6 to 4.5 lb) and females 1.20 to 1.50 kg (2.6 to 3.3 lb). Adults of both sex have the same plumage. Their heads and necks are red-brown, with a short, thin black bill. The iris is dark brown, with a white eyering. The back, breast, and flanks are gray and buff with brown barring. The wings are gray overall, with an iridescent green speculum, black primaries, and bright white lesser wing-coverts and secondaries. They have a cinnamon belly, sometimes with white patches, and their tail is black. The legs and feet are orange with black blotchy markings, and the carpal knob is orange. Juveniles are similar to adults but duller overall and with a blackish or gray speculum.

== Distribution and habitat ==
The ruddy-headed goose is found in the eastern Chilean and Argentinian parts of Tierra del Fuego and north from there to Buenos Aires Province, Argentina. It is also found on the Falkland Islands. It inhabits open landscapes such as meadows, Pampas wetlands, the borders of ponds, and coastal grasslands and meadows.

== Behavior ==
=== Movement ===
Ruddy-headed geese are year-round residents of the Falkland Islands, though they make local movements there. The species nests in Tierra del Fuego and far southern mainland Argentina and for the winter migrates north from there as far as Argentina's Buenos Aires Province.

=== Feeding ===
The ruddy-headed goose is almost entirely vegetarian and feeds mostly on the ground rather than in water. On the breeding grounds its diet is small berries and the roots, leaves, stems, and seeds of grasses and sedges. During winter it feeds on young wheat and in harvested fields of maize, sunflower, and sorghum.

=== Breeding ===
The ruddy-headed goose's breeding season begins as early as September on the Falkland Islands and in mid-October on the mainland. It nests singly or in small loose groups. Nests are placed in long grass or amid boulders and are lined with down. The clutch size is three to eight eggs. Males guard females during the incubation period of about 30 days. The time to fledging is not known.

=== Vocalization ===
Male and female ruddy-headed geese have different vocalizations: Males make a "short, whistled 'seep'" and females a "short rasping quack".

== Status ==
The IUCN has assessed the ruddy-headed goose as being of Least Concern, though its population size is unknown and believed to be decreasing. The population in the Falklands appears robust but that in Tierra del Fuego and mainland South America may be only a few hundred birds after major decline in the 20th century. A major cause of the crash is predation by the South American gray fox, which was introduced to Tierra del Fuego in the 1950s to control rabbits. A Memorandum of Understanding was negotiated in 2006 with Argentina and Chile under the Bonn Convention in an attempt to safeguard the remaining migratory Tierra del Fuego/mainland population.
