= Herluf Winge =

Danish zoologist

Adolf Herluf Winge
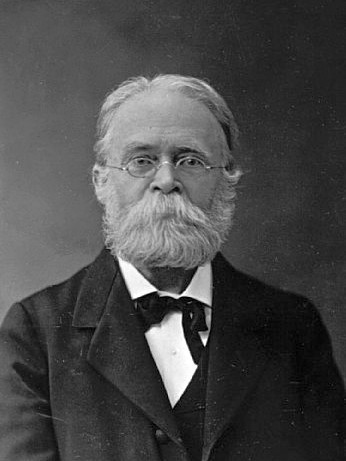
- Born: 19 March 1857; Copenhagen, Denmark
- Died: 10 November 1923 (aged 66); Hellerup, Denmark
- Scientific career
- Fields: Zoology, paleontology
- Author abbrev. (zoology): Winge

Adolf Herluf Winge (19 March 1857 – 10 November 1923) was a Danish zoologist.

== Biography ==
As a young student, along with his brother Oluf, Winge was interested in small mammals, particularly moles, shrews and insectivora. He studied mammalian dentition and produced a comparison of cusp similarities. He worked at the Zoological Museum in the University of Copenhagen from 1885. A major work was his three volumes of E Museo Lundii on the extinct fauna of South America with 75 plates that he drew. He also studied the animal remains found in the kitchen-middens of Denmark.

Winge was described as a Lamarckist by some authors.
