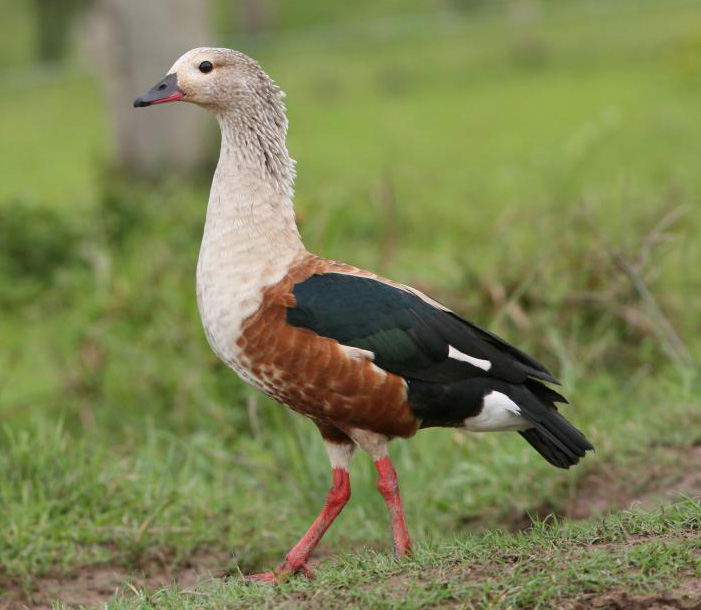
- Orinoco goose, Neochen jubata

Scientific classification
- Kingdom: Animalia
- Phylum: Chordata
- Class: Aves
- Order: Anseriformes
- Family: Anatidae
- Subfamily: Anatinae
- Genus: Neochen; Oberholser, 1918

Type species
- Anser jubatus Spix, 1825

Species
- N. jubata; †N. barbadiana; †N. debilis; †N. pugil

= Neochen =

Genus of birds

Neochen is a genus of birds in the family Anatidae.

== Extant species ==
The genus contains a single living species:

Image	Scientific name	Common name	Distribution
	Neochen jubata	Orinoco goose	South America

== Fossil species ==
- †Neochen barbadiana - Late Pleistocene, Barbados
- †Neochen debilis - Middle Pleistocene, Argentina
- †Neochen pugil - Late Pleistocene or Early Holocene, Brazil
