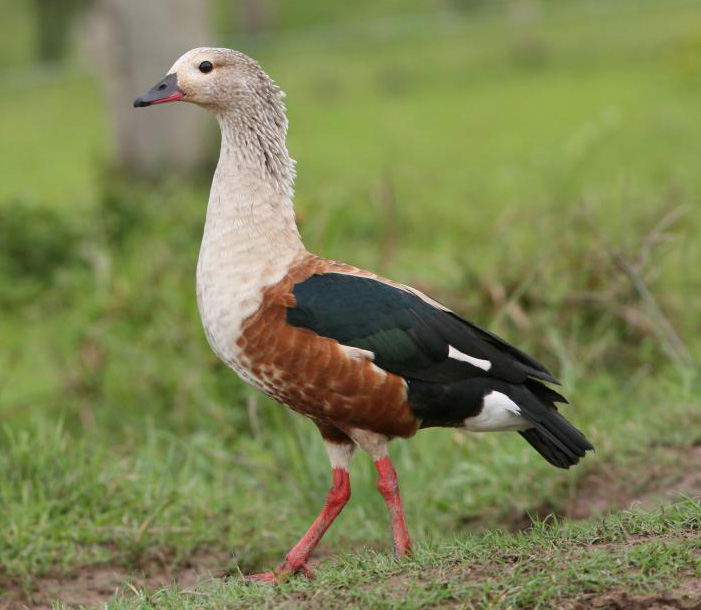

Conservation status
- Least Concern (IUCN 3.1)

Scientific classification
- Kingdom: Animalia
- Phylum: Chordata
- Class: Aves
- Order: Anseriformes
- Family: Anatidae
- Genus: Neochen
- Species: N. jubata

Binomial name
- Neochen jubata (Spix, 1825)

Synonyms
- Oressochen jubatus

= Orinoco goose =

Species of bird

The Orinoco goose (Neochen jubata) is a species of waterfowl in the tribe Tadornini of subfamily Anserinae. It is found in every mainland South American country except Chile, French Guiana, Suriname, and Uruguay.

== Taxonomy and systematics ==
The Orinoco goose's taxonomy is unsettled. The International Ornithological Committee (IOC) and BirdLife International's Handbook of the Birds of the World (HBW) place it alone in the genus Neochen. However, based on a molecular phylogenetic study published in 2014, the South American Classification Committee of the American Ornithological Society and the Clements taxonomy place it and the Andean goose in the resurrected genus Oressochen. The IOC and HBW place the Andean goose in the genus Chloephaga.

Two fossil relatives have been described from Pleistocene sites in South America, Neochen pugil and N. debilis.

The Orinoco goose is monotypic.

== Description ==
The Orinoco goose is 61 to 76 cm (24 to 30 in) long. Males weigh about 1.8 kg (4.0 lb) and females about 1.3 kg (2.9 lb). Adult males have an off-white head, neck, and breast with slight buffy streaks on the nape and buffy scalloping on the breast. Their mantle is gray with white scalloping. They have an orange band across the upper mantle and onto the sides of the breast and flanks and a crescent of dark brown behind the flanks. Their undertail coverts are white. Their wings are black with a wide white speculum. Also, their bill has a black maxilla and a mostly red mandible and their legs and feet are bright salmon red. Adult females have a similar pattern as the males but have a drab wash on their crown and nape, less orange on the flanks, and darker scalloping on the sides of the belly. Their legs and feet are more a dull orange than bright red.

== Distribution and habitat ==
The Orinoco goose is found from Venezuela south through Colombia, eastern Ecuador, eastern Peru, and Bolivia into far northern Argentina and in a broad swath across central Brazil. An isolated population spans the northern Brazil–Guyana border. Though the IUCN range map includes French Guiana, Suriname, and Paraguay, the South American Classification Committee of the American Ornithological Society has no records in the first two countries and records only as a vagrant in Paraguay.

The Orinoco goose inhabits wet savanna and the edges of large freshwater wetlands in the wet season and in the dry season, it is also found on river beaches and oxbow lakes in the Amazon Basin.

== Behavior ==
=== Migration ===
The Orinoco goose is a year-round resident of the Llanos of Venezuela and possibly Colombia. Some of the Bolivian population is also non-migratory. However, some leave the Llanos de Moxos to breed 700 km (430 mi) away in Manú National Park, Peru, and others move almost 1,000 km (620 mi) along the Río Juruá in western Brazil. The migration patterns of other populations, or lack theorof, are not known.

The migration of Orinoco geese may spread disease. Toxoplasma gondii and Neospora caninum are both apicomplexan parasites that infect various animals and cause severe disease. They thrive in fields where Orinoco geese forage during stopovers during migration. Once birds are infected, they can transmit the parasites to other birds or humans. Orinoco goose meat is eaten by people in Bolivia and Brazil, potentially leading to human infection.

=== Feeding ===
The Orinoco goose is herbivorous and feeds mainly on leaves and seed heads, especially those of grasses. It also feeds on aquatic algae in stagnant water along rivers and oxbows. It mostly forages during the day in open areas near water, although it also forages at night. Individuals move between feeding and resting areas at dawn and dusk.

=== Breeding ===
The Ornico goose's breeding season varies geographically and with rainfall patterns. Populations below the Equator nest between April and November, a mostly dry season. In Venezuela most nest in the July to August wet season though some nest at other times. Orinoco geese nest in both natural and artificial cavities. They use cavities in trees formed by natural causes such as limb loss or rot rather than those created by other cavity-nesting species and may compete with owls and parrots for cavities. There are some reports of nesting on the ground in dense grass but that strategy appears rare.

Orinoco geese are sometimes brood parasites, with a female laying eggs in another Orinoco goose's nest. In one study, unparasitized nests had a clutch size averaging seven eggs while the parasitized ones averaged about 19. Nest success as a percentage of the clutch was higher in parasitized nests.

Orinoco geese form strong year-round pair bonds and are intensely territorial during the breeding season. Males guard females during the incubation period.

=== Vocalization ===
The Orinoco goose is very vocal. During the breeding season males make "a high whistle and guttural honks" and females "a loud cackle". Males also make "a shrill-whistled zree and series of hollow reedy whistles" and females "a low guttural honking gu'rump, gur'rump, gur'rump". Both sexes make "a distinctive nasal honking, unnhh?". Young make "soft chicken-like peeps".

== Status ==
The IUCN assessed the Orinoco goose as Near Threatened from 2004 – 2025. As of 2025, it has been downlisted to Least Concern. It has a large range and an estimated population of 15,000 – 40,000 mature individuals, which is decreasing slowly. The major cause of the decline appears to be habitat loss, though hunting may also play a small role. Conservation efforts should focus on river margins, sandy beaches along main river channels, and migration routes.
