= Neochen debilis =

Neochen debilis Temporal range: Mid Pleistocene

Scientific classification
- Kingdom: Animalia
- Phylum: Chordata
- Class: Aves
- Order: Anseriformes
- Family: Anatidae
- Genus: Neochen
- Species: N. debilis

Binomial name
- Neochen debilis (Ameghino 1891)

Synonyms
- Chenalopex debilis Ameghino 1891

Extinct species of bird

Neochen debilis is an extinct species of goose from the Middle Pleistocene Belgrano Formation of Argentina. Argentine paleontologist Florentino Ameghino described the species from a tarsometatarsus discovered in La Plata. It was smaller than the extant Orinoco goose.
