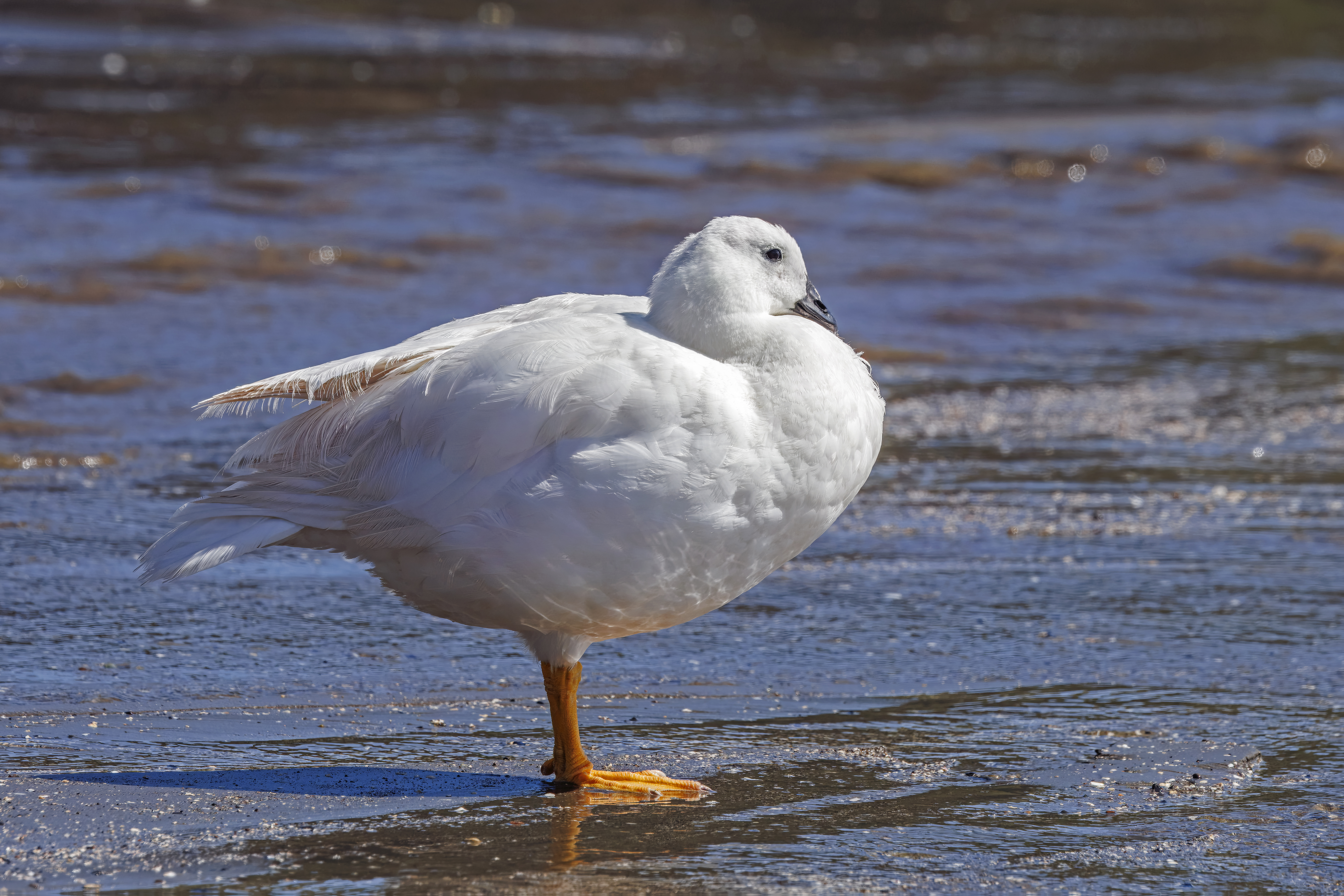
- Male
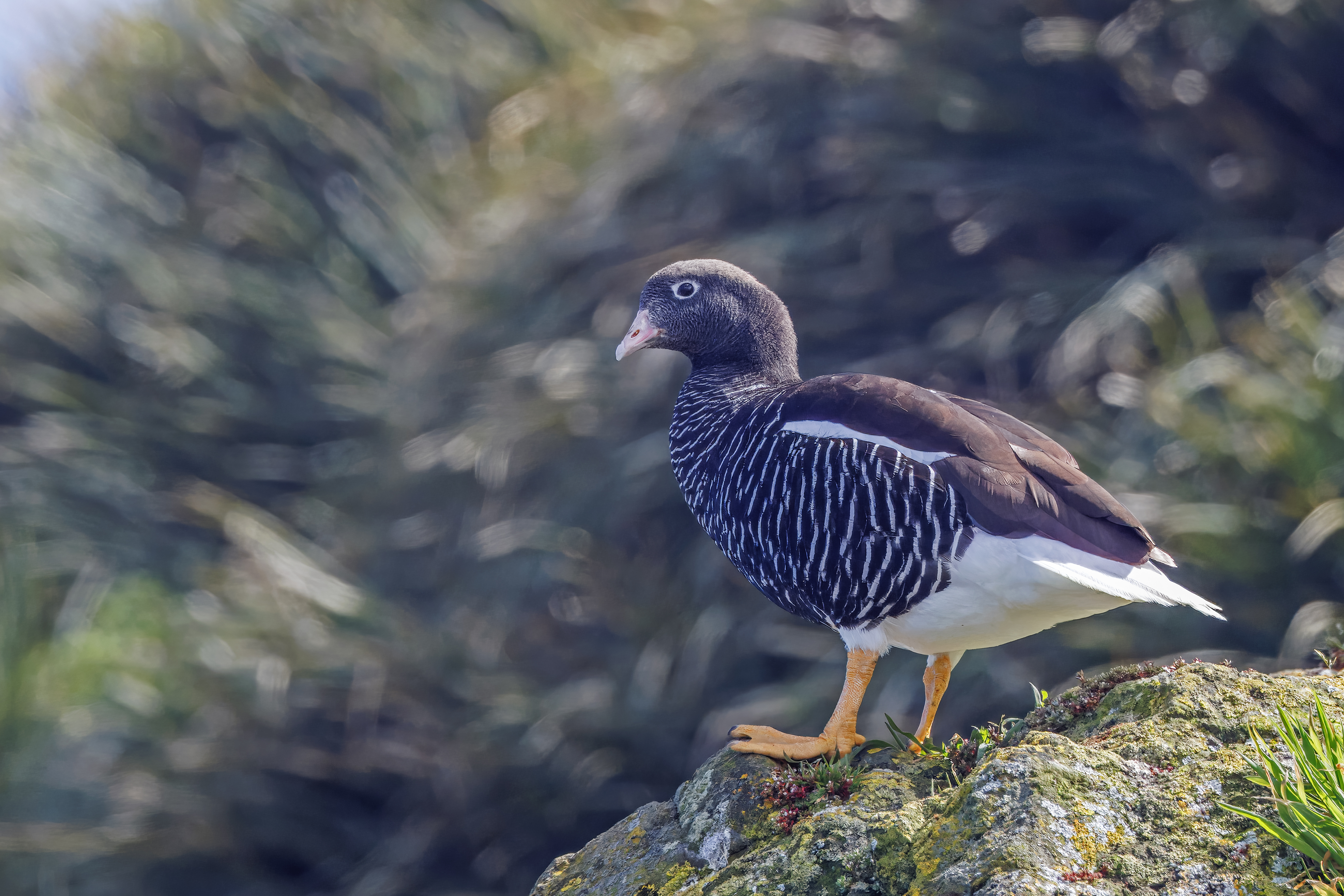
- Female both on Chiloé Island, Chile

Conservation status
- Least Concern (IUCN 3.1)

Scientific classification
- Kingdom: Animalia
- Phylum: Chordata
- Class: Aves
- Order: Anseriformes
- Family: Anatidae
- Genus: Chloephaga
- Species: C. hybrida

Binomial name
- Chloephaga hybrida (Molina, 1782)

Subspecies
- Chloephaga hybrida hybrida (Molina, 1782); Chloephaga hybrida malvinarum (Phillips, 1916)

= Kelp goose =

Species of bird

The kelp goose (Chloephaga hybrida) is a species of waterfowl in tribe the Tadornini of the subfamily Anserinae. It is found in Argentina, Chile, and the Falkland Islands.

== Taxonomy and systematics ==
The kelp goose has two subspecies, the nominate C. h. hybrida and C. h. malvinarum.

== Description ==
The kelp goose is 55 to 65 cm (22 to 26 in) long. Males of the nominate subspecies weigh 2.54 to 2.58 kg (5.6 to 5.7 lb) and females 2.00 to 2.02 kg (4.4 to 4.5 lb). Subspecies C. h. malvinarum is heavier: Males weigh 3.25 to 3.60 kg (7.2 to 7.9 lb) and females 2.05 to 2.80 kg (4.5 to 6.2 lb). The two subspecies have the same plumage but the sexes are completely different. Adult males are entirely white but for a black bill with a pink spot on the maxilla and yellow legs and feet. Adult females have a pale brown crown and chocolate brown head, neck, and mantle. Their breast and flanks have black and white bars and their back, tail, and undertail coverts are white. Their bill is pink and their legs and feet yellow. Juvenile males resemble adult females but with brown "shoulders" and greenish-yellow legs and feet. Juvenile females have a dark crown and dark uppertail coverts.

== Distribution and habitat ==
The nominate subspecies of kelp goose is found on coastal southern Chile and Argentina including the Tierra del Fuego archipelago. C. h. malvinarum is found only on the Falkland Islands. Except when nesting, the species inhabits rocky coasts or shingle beaches with kelp beds offshore. It nests at coastal freshwater lakes.

== Behavior ==
=== Movement ===
The nominate subspecies of kelp goose is found year-round along the southern Chile coast and in Tierra del Fuego. It is mostly sedentary, with some individuals moving further north in Chile and others north along the Atlantic coast of Argentina in the austral winter. C. h. malvinarum is also mostly sedentary throughout the Falklands, but some individuals move from more exposed offshore islands to larger ones in winter.

=== Feeding ===
The kelp goose is almost entirely vegetarian, though it probably ingests small invertebrates incidentally. It forages mostly by grazing though it sometimes dips under water to feed. On the coast it feeds on several species of seaweed and some algae. During breeding it feeds on grass and in winter sometimes on berries. During the summer, 100 or more non-breeding geese may gather on the shore.

=== Breeding ===
The kelp goose's breeding season (up to hatching) on the mainland extends from October to January; that on the Falklands begins somewhat sooner and extends only to November. The species nests in pairs or loose groups. It builds a nest of grass lined with down, on the mainland near somewhat inland freshwater lakes and on the Falklands close to the shore. Nests are sited in vegetation or beside a boulder or driftwood. The clutch size is three to seven eggs. Males guard females during the incubation period of about 30 days. Young leave the nest shortly after the last egg hatches and fledging occurs 12 to 13 weeks after hatch. Both parents care for the young into winter.

=== Vocalization ===
Male and female kelp geese have different vocalizations: Males make a "whistled 'si-si-si'" and females "low honking 'arnk-arnk', 'ooer' or 'ooeroo' calls". Very young chicks make "a double-noted 'cheep'."

== Conservation status ==
The IUCN has assessed the kelp goose as being of Least Concern. It has a large range, and though its population size is unknown it is believed to be stable. No immediate threats have been identified. It "does not compete with human interests due to inaccessibility and [the] types of habitats preferred" but "[c]ould be at risk from spillage of oil or other toxic substances on rocky coasts."

== Gallery ==
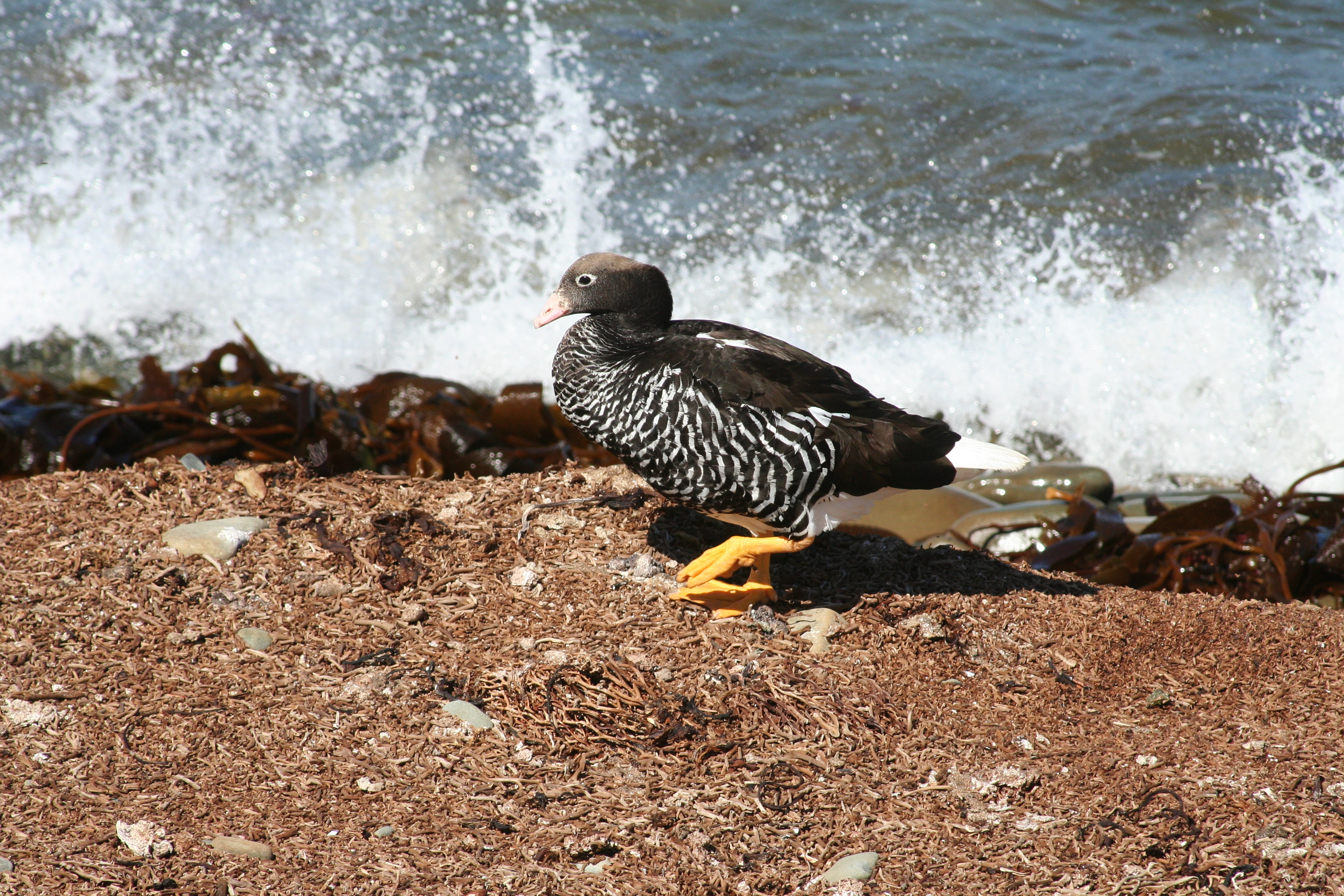
Female on East Falkland

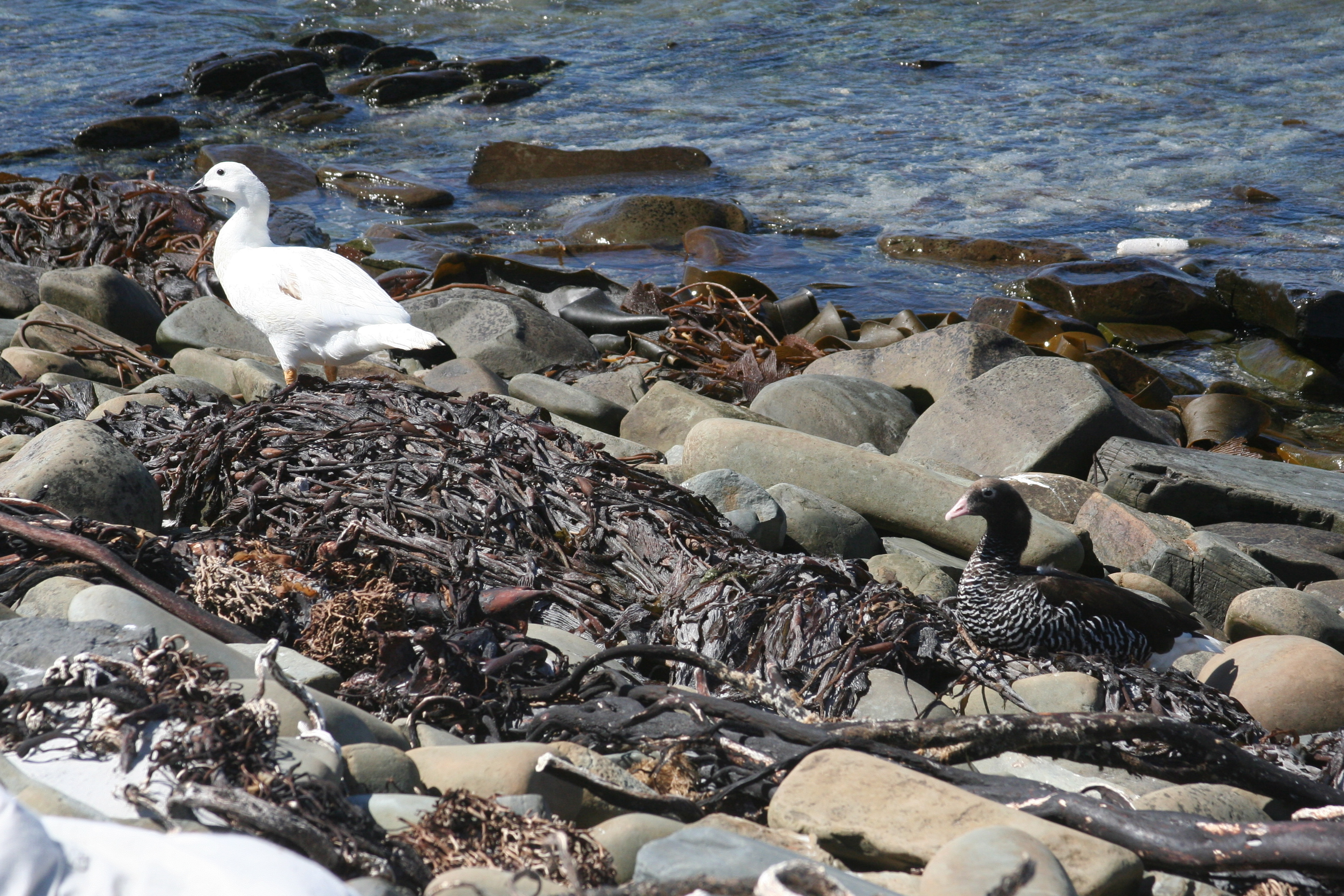
A pair on East Falkland

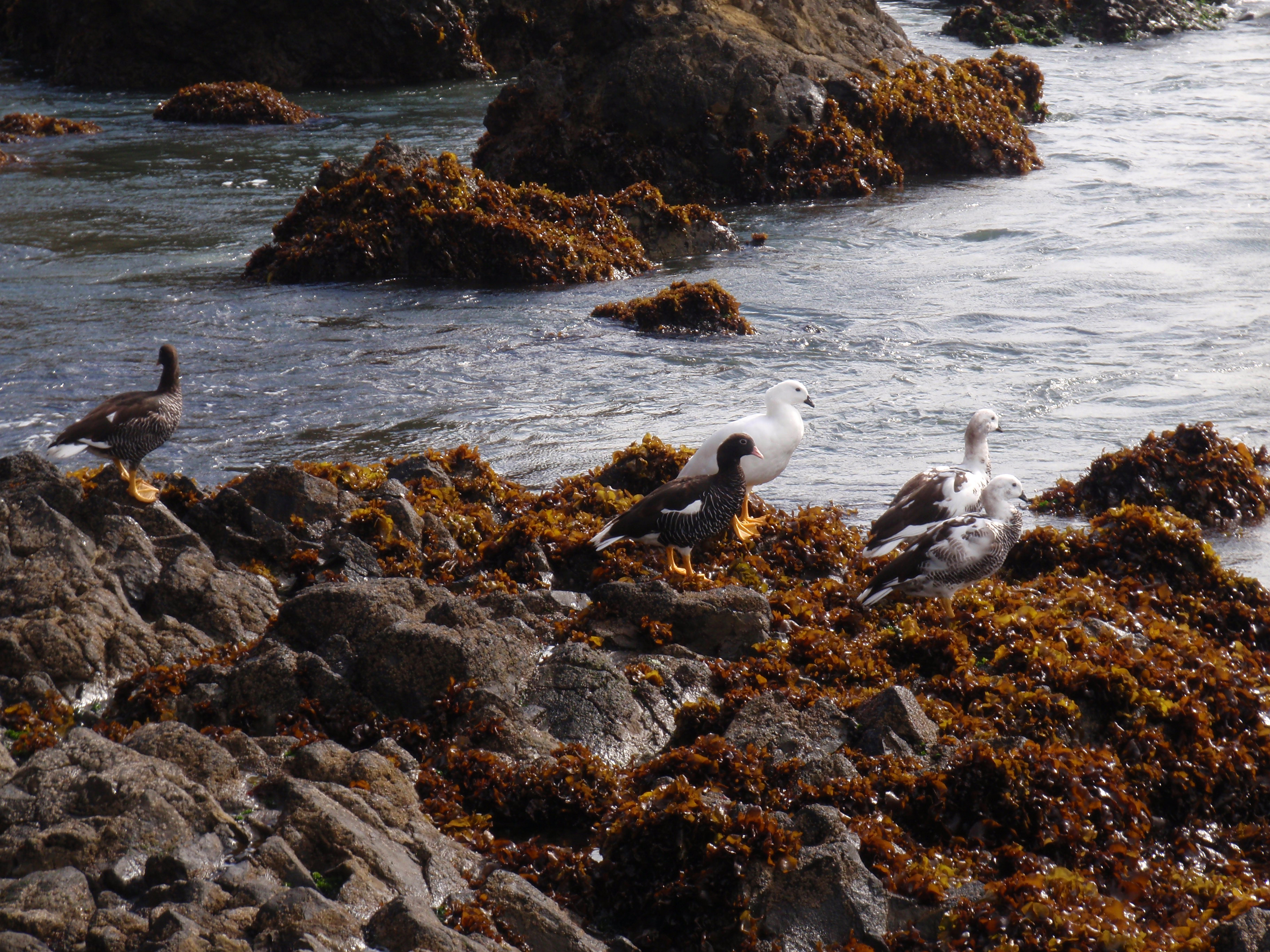
Two females, one male, and two juveniles on Chiloé Island, Chile.
