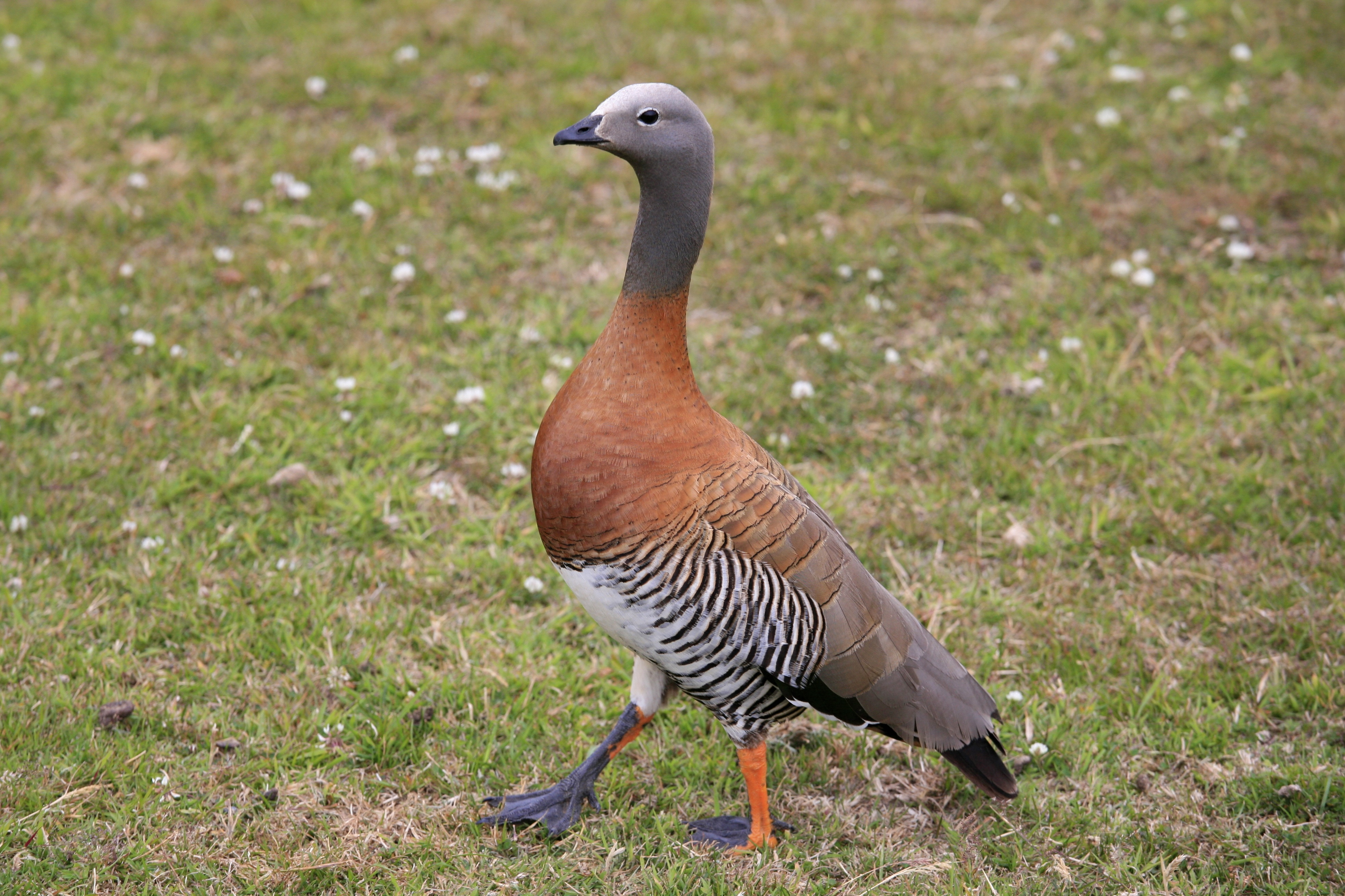
- Adult in Patagonia, South America

Conservation status
- Least Concern (IUCN 3.1)

Scientific classification
- Kingdom: Animalia
- Phylum: Chordata
- Class: Aves
- Order: Anseriformes
- Family: Anatidae
- Genus: Chloephaga
- Species: C. poliocephala

Binomial name
- Chloephaga poliocephala P.L. Sclater, 1857

= Ashy-headed goose =

Species of bird

The ashy-headed goose (Chloephaga poliocephala) is a species of waterfowl in tribe Tadornini of subfamily Anserinae. It is found in Argentina and Chile.

== Taxonomy and systematics ==
The ashy-headed goose is monotypic.

== Description ==
The ashy-headed goose is 50 to 60 cm (20 to 24 in) long. Males weigh 1.62 to 2.27 kg (3.6 to 5.0 lb) and females 1.47 to 1.49 kg (3.2 to 3.3 lb). Adults have the same plumage. Their heads and necks are gray, their upper back and breast chestnut with fine barring, their flanks barred black and white, and their belly white. In flight their blackish wings show bold white leading and trailing patches and a metallic green speculum. Their bill is black and the legs and feet orange with black markings. Juveniles' rufous areas are much duller, their back and breast barring stronger, and their speculum dark brownish.

== Distribution and habitat ==
The ashy-headed goose is a bird of South America's southern cone from central Chile and Buenos Aires Province, Argentina, south into Tierra del Fuego. It also occurs as vagrant on the Falkland Islands and has bred there. In summer it primarily inhabits clearings in damp forests of southern beech (Nothofagus sp.) around lakes and marshes, on inland islands, near the coast, and on higher ground. In winter it favors meadows and pastures.

== Behavior ==
=== Movement ===
The ashy-headed goose nests south of 37° south latitude in Chile and western Argentina. In winter much of the population moves further north in Chile and onto the Argentinian Pampas.

=== Feeding ===
The ashy-headed goose is almost entirely vegetarian. A study of its diet on its wintering grounds in Argentina showed it feeding mainly in harvested fields of wheat, maize, sunflower, and sorghum. One in the austral summer in Tierra del Fuego showed a diet there of leaves and fleshy fruits. Red crowberry (Empetrum rubrum) was the dominant fruit.

=== Breeding ===
The ashy-headed goose's breeding season begins in October to November and in some areas lasts to March. It nests singly or in small loose groups. Nests are placed in a tree hollow, on a stump, or in long grass, and are lined with down. The clutch size is four to six eggs. Males guard females during the incubation period of about 30 days. The time to fledging is not known.

=== Vocalization ===
Male and female ashy-headed geese have different vocalizations: Males make "soft, wigeon-like whistles" and females "harsh cackling notes".

== Status ==
The IUCN has assessed the ashy-headed goose as being of Least Concern. It has a large range, and though its population size is unknown it is believed to be stable. No immediate threats have been identified. Winter surveys in northeastern Argentina estimated that as many as 150,000 may be there. The species is "[r]elatively free from human persecution at [the] breeding grounds" but in winter is persecuted by farmers who view it as a competitor to their livestock.

== Gallery ==
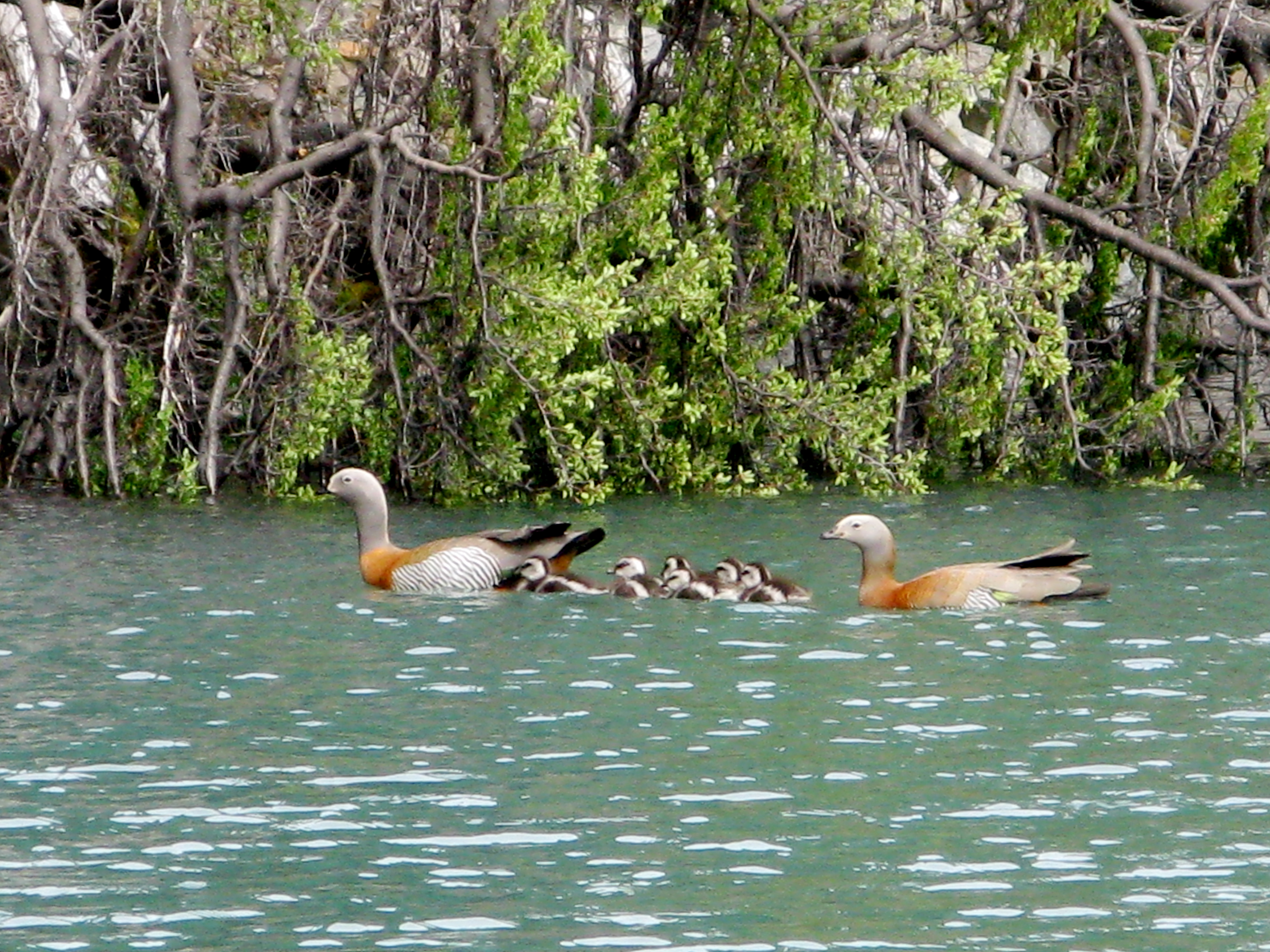
Parents with chicks in Tierra del Fuego

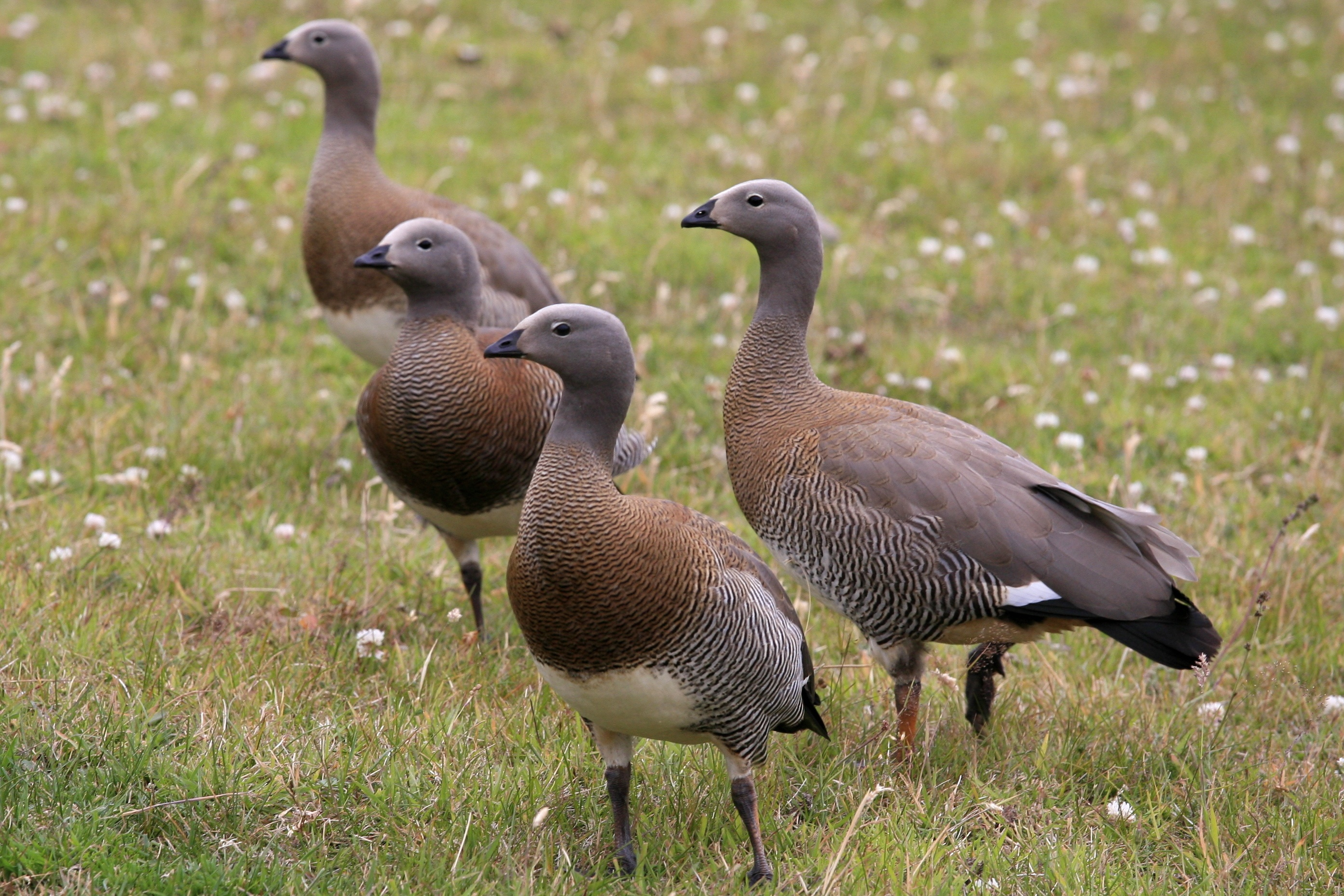
Juveniles in Patagonia

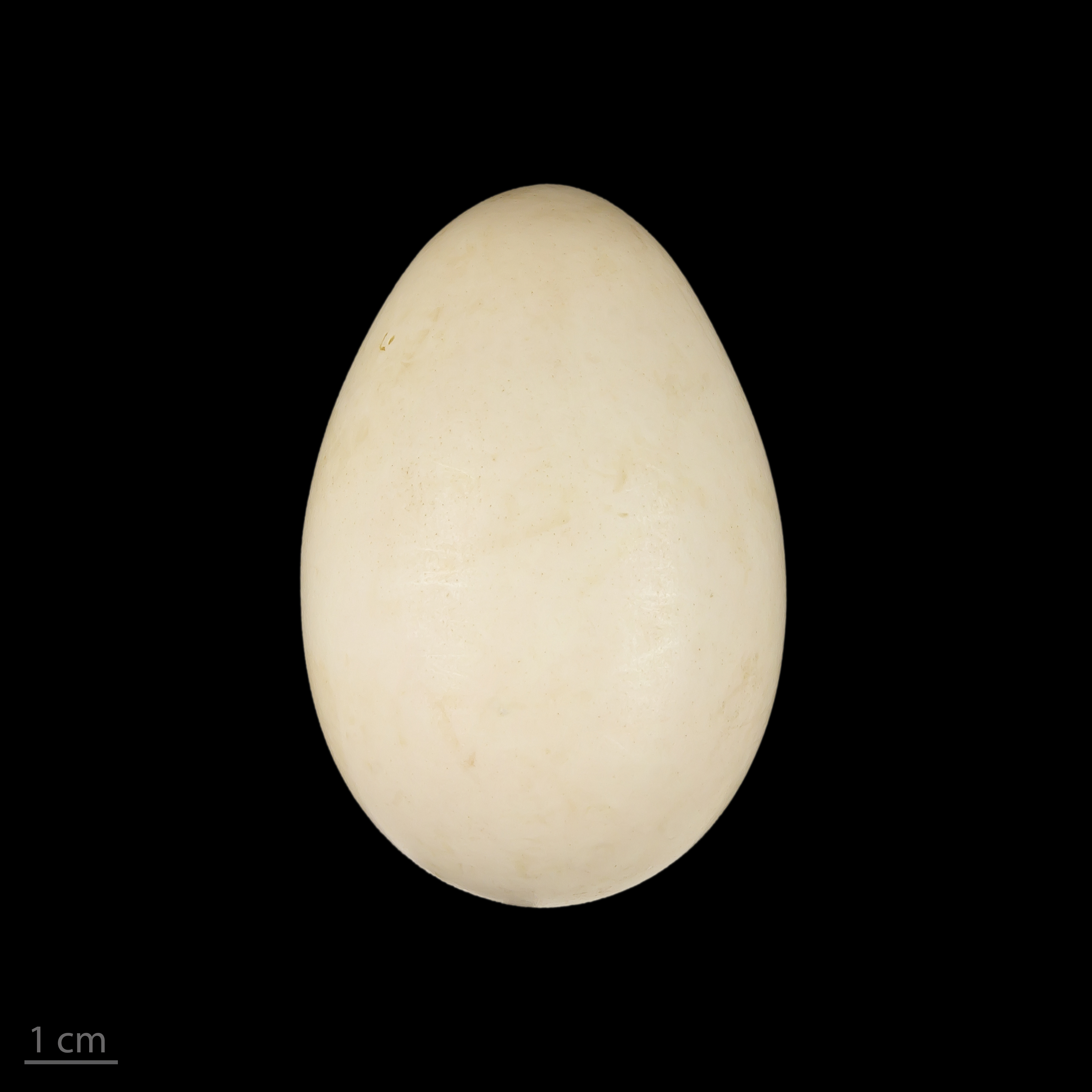
Chloephaga poliocephala egg - MHNT

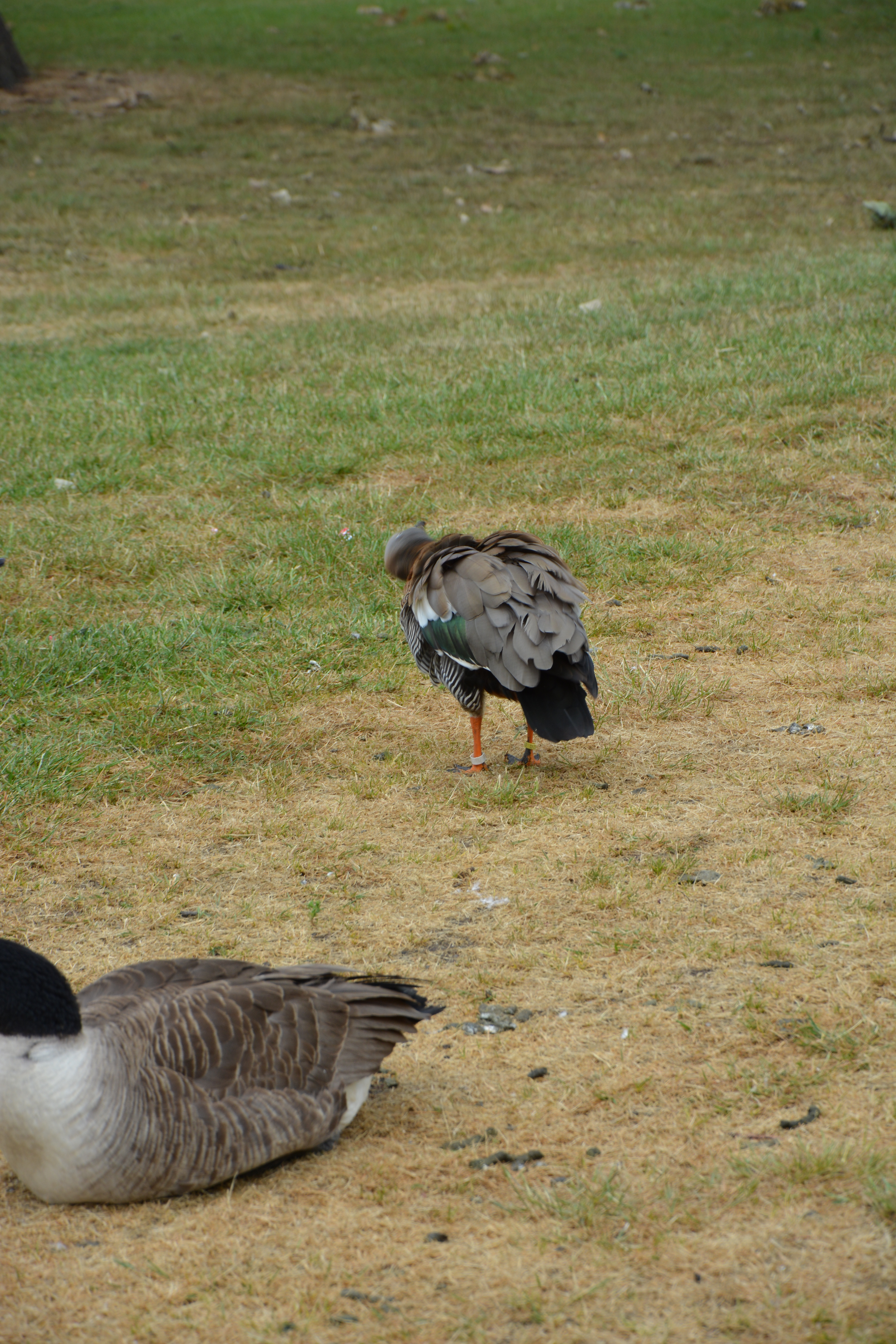
Ashy headed goose shaking Its feathers
