= List of Anatidae species =

The avian family Anatidae, commonly called waterfowl, comprise the ducks, geese, and swans. The International Ornithological Committee (IOC) recognizes these 174 Anatidae species distributed among 53 genera, 32 of which have only one species. Eight species on the list are extinct; they are marked (E).

This list is presented according to the IOC taxonomic sequence and can also be sorted alphabetically by common name and binomial.

Common name	Binomial name + authority	IOC sequence
White-faced whistling duck	Dendrocygna viduata (Linnaeus, 1766)	1
Black-bellied whistling duck	Dendrocygna autumnalis (Linnaeus, 1758)	2
Spotted whistling duck	Dendrocygna guttata Schlegel, 1866	3
West Indian whistling duck	Dendrocygna arborea (Linnaeus, 1758)	4
Fulvous whistling duck	Dendrocygna bicolor (Vieillot, 1816)	5
Plumed whistling duck	Dendrocygna eytoni (Eyton, 1838)	6
Wandering whistling duck	Dendrocygna arcuata (Horsfield, 1824)	7
Lesser whistling duck	Dendrocygna javanica (Horsfield, 1821)	8
White-backed duck	Thalassornis leuconotus Eyton, 1838	9
Cape Barren goose	Cereopsis novaehollandiae Latham, 1801	10
Brant goose	Branta bernicla (Linnaeus, 1758)	11
Red-breasted goose	Branta ruficollis (Pallas, 1769)	12
Nene	Branta sandvicensis (Vigors, 1834)	13
Canada goose	Branta canadensis (Linnaeus, 1758)	14
Barnacle goose	Branta leucopsis (Bechstein, 1803)	15
Cackling goose	Branta hutchinsii (Richardson, 1832)	16
Bar-headed goose	Anser indicus (Latham, 1790)	17
Emperor goose	Anser canagicus (Sevastianov, 1802)	18
Ross's goose	Anser rossii Cassin, 1861	19
Snow goose	Anser caerulescens (Linnaeus, 1758)	20
Greylag goose	Anser anser (Linnaeus, 1758)	21
Swan goose	Anser cygnoides (Linnaeus, 1758)	22
Taiga bean goose	Anser fabalis (Latham, 1787)	23
Pink-footed goose	Anser brachyrhynchus Baillon, 1834	24
Tundra bean goose	Anser serrirostris Gould, 1852	25
Greater white-fronted goose	Anser albifrons (Scopoli, 1769)	26
Lesser white-fronted goose	Anser erythropus (Linnaeus, 1758)	27
Coscoroba swan	Coscoroba coscoroba (Molina, 1782)	28
Black swan	Cygnus atratus (Latham, 1790)	29
Black-necked swan	Cygnus melancoryphus (Molina, 1782)	30
Mute swan	Cygnus olor (Gmelin, JF, 1789)	31
Trumpeter swan	Cygnus buccinator Richardson, 1831	32
Tundra swan	Cygnus columbianus (Ord, 1815)	33
Whooper swan	Cygnus cygnus (Linnaeus, 1758)	34
Freckled duck	Stictonetta naevosa (Gould, 1841)	35
Blue duck	Hymenolaimus malacorhynchos (Gmelin, JF, 1789)	36
Flying steamer duck	Tachyeres patachonicus (King, PP, 1831)	37
Fuegian steamer duck	Tachyeres pteneres (Forster, JR, 1844)	38
Falkland steamer duck	Tachyeres brachypterus (Latham, 1790)	39
Chubut steamer duck	Tachyeres leucocephalus Humphrey & Thompson, 1981	40
Torrent duck	Merganetta armata Gould, 1842	41
Spur-winged goose	Plectropterus gambensis (Linnaeus, 1766)	42
Comb duck	Sarkidiornis sylvicola Ihering, HFA & Ihering, R, 1907	43
Knob-billed duck	Sarkidiornis melanotos (Pennant, 1769)	44
Blue-winged goose	Cyanochen cyanoptera (Rüppell, 1845)	45
Egyptian goose	Alopochen aegyptiaca (Linnaeus, 1766)	46
Mauritius sheldgoose	Alopochen mauritiana (Newton, E & Gadow, 1893) (E)	47
Reunion sheldgoose	Alopochen kervazoi (Cowles, 1994) (E)	48
Orinoco goose	Neochen jubata (Spix, 1825)	49
Andean goose	Chloephaga melanoptera (Eyton, 1838)	50
Upland goose	Chloephaga picta (Gmelin, JF, 1789)	51
Kelp goose	Chloephaga hybrida (Molina, 1782)	52
Ashy-headed goose	Chloephaga poliocephala Sclater, PL, 1857	53
Ruddy-headed goose	Chloephaga rubidiceps Sclater, PL, 1861	54
Radjah shelduck	Radjah radjah (Garnot & Lesson, RP, 1828)	55
Common shelduck	Tadorna tadorna (Linnaeus, 1758)	56
Ruddy shelduck	Tadorna ferruginea (Pallas, 1764)	57
South African shelduck	Tadorna cana (Gmelin, JF, 1789)	58
Australian shelduck	Tadorna tadornoides (Jardine & Selby, 1828)	59
Paradise shelduck	Tadorna variegata (Gmelin, JF, 1789)	60
Crested shelduck	Tadorna cristata (Kuroda, Nm, 1917) (E)	61
Pink-eared duck	Malacorhynchus membranaceus (Latham, 1801)	62
Salvadori's teal	Salvadorina waigiuensis Rothschild & Hartert, EJO, 1894	63
Muscovy duck	Cairina moschata (Linnaeus, 1758)	64
White-winged duck	Asarcornis scutulata (Müller, S, 1842)	65
Hartlaub's duck	Pteronetta hartlaubii (Cassin, 1860)	66
Wood duck	Aix sponsa (Linnaeus, 1758)	67
Mandarin duck	Aix galericulata (Linnaeus, 1758)	68
Maned duck	Chenonetta jubata (Latham, 1801)	69
African pygmy goose	Nettapus auritus (Boddaert, 1783)	70
Cotton pygmy goose	Nettapus coromandelianus (Gmelin, JF, 1789)	71
Green pygmy goose	Nettapus pulchellus Gould, 1842	72
Brazilian teal	Amazonetta brasiliensis (Gmelin, JF, 1789)	73
Ringed teal	Callonetta leucophrys (Vieillot, 1816)	74
Crested duck	Lophonetta specularioides (King, PP, 1828)	75
Bronze-winged duck	Speculanas specularis (King, PP, 1828)	76
Baikal teal	Sibirionetta formosa (Georgi, 1775)	77
Garganey	Spatula querquedula (Linnaeus, 1758)	78
Blue-billed teal	Spatula hottentota (Eyton, 1838)	79
Puna teal	Spatula puna (Tschudi, 1844)	80
Silver teal	Spatula versicolor (Vieillot, 1816)	81
Red shoveler	Spatula platalea (Vieillot, 1816)	82
Cinnamon teal	Spatula cyanoptera (Vieillot, 1816)	83
Blue-winged teal	Spatula discors (Linnaeus, 1766)	84
Cape shoveler	Spatula smithii Hartert, EJO, 1891	85
Australasian shoveler	Spatula rhynchotis (Latham, 1801)	86
Northern shoveler	Spatula clypeata (Linnaeus, 1758)	87
Gadwall	Mareca strepera (Linnaeus, 1758)	88
Falcated duck	Mareca falcata (Georgi, 1775)	89
Eurasian wigeon	Mareca penelope (Linnaeus, 1758)	90
Chiloe wigeon	Mareca sibilatrix (Poeppig, 1829)	91
American wigeon	Mareca americana (Gmelin, JF, 1789)	92
Amsterdam wigeon	Mareca marecula (Olson & Jouventin, 1996) (E)	93
African black duck	Anas sparsa Eyton, 1838	94
Yellow-billed duck	Anas undulata Dubois, CF, 1838	95
Meller's duck	Anas melleri Sclater, PL, 1865	96
Pacific black duck	Anas superciliosa Gmelin, JF, 1789	97
Laysan duck	Anas laysanensis Rothschild, 1892	98
Hawaiian duck	Anas wyvilliana Sclater, PL, 1878	99
Philippine duck	Anas luzonica Fraser, 1839	100
Indian spot-billed duck	Anas poecilorhyncha Forster, JR, 1781	101
Eastern spot-billed duck	Anas zonorhyncha Swinhoe, 1866	102
Mallard	Anas platyrhynchos Linnaeus, 1758	103
Mottled duck	Anas fulvigula Ridgway, 1874	104
American black duck	Anas rubripes Brewster, 1902	105
Mexican duck	Anas diazi Ridgway, 1886	106
Cape teal	Anas capensis Gmelin, JF, 1789	107
White-cheeked pintail	Anas bahamensis Linnaeus, 1758	108
Red-billed teal	Anas erythrorhyncha Gmelin, JF, 1789	109
Yellow-billed pintail	Anas georgica Gmelin, JF, 1789	110
Eaton's pintail	Anas eatoni (Sharpe, 1875)	111
Northern pintail	Anas acuta Linnaeus, 1758	112
Eurasian teal	Anas crecca Linnaeus, 1758	113
Green-winged teal	Anas carolinensis Gmelin, JF, 1789	114
Yellow-billed teal	Anas flavirostris Vieillot, 1816	115
Andean teal	Anas andium (Sclater, PL & Salvin, 1873)	116
Sunda teal	Anas gibberifrons Müller, S, 1842	117
Andaman teal	Anas albogularis (Hume, 1873)	118
Mascarene teal	Anas theodori Newton, E & Gadow, 1893 (E)	119
Grey teal	Anas gracilis Buller, 1869	120
Chestnut teal	Anas castanea (Eyton, 1838)	121
Bernier's teal	Anas bernieri (Hartlaub, 1860)	122
Brown teal	Anas chlorotis Gray, GR, 1845	123
Auckland teal	Anas aucklandica (Gray, GR, 1844)	124
Campbell teal	Anas nesiotis (Fleming, JH, 1935)	125
Marbled duck	Marmaronetta angustirostris (Ménétriés, 1832)	126
Pink-headed duck	Rhodonessa caryophyllacea (Latham, 1790) (E)	127
Red-crested pochard	Netta rufina (Pallas, 1773)	128
Rosy-billed pochard	Netta peposaca (Vieillot, 1816)	129
Southern pochard	Netta erythrophthalma (Wied-Neuwied, M, 1833)	130
Canvasback	Aythya valisineria (Wilson, A, 1814)	131
Redhead	Aythya americana (Eyton, 1838)	132
Common pochard	Aythya ferina (Linnaeus, 1758)	133
Hardhead	Aythya australis (Eyton, 1838)	134
Madagascar pochard	Aythya innotata (Salvadori, 1894)	135
Baer's pochard	Aythya baeri (Radde, 1863)	136
Ferruginous duck	Aythya nyroca (Güldenstädt, 1770)	137
New Zealand scaup	Aythya novaeseelandiae (Gmelin, JF, 1789)	138
Ring-necked duck	Aythya collaris (Donovan, 1809)	139
Tufted duck	Aythya fuligula (Linnaeus, 1758)	140
Greater scaup	Aythya marila (Linnaeus, 1761)	141
Lesser scaup	Aythya affinis (Eyton, 1838)	142
Steller's eider	Polysticta stelleri (Pallas, 1769)	143
Spectacled eider	Somateria fischeri (Brandt, JF, 1847)	144
King eider	Somateria spectabilis (Linnaeus, 1758)	145
Common eider	Somateria mollissima (Linnaeus, 1758)	146
Harlequin duck	Histrionicus histrionicus (Linnaeus, 1758)	147
Labrador duck	Camptorhynchus labradorius (Gmelin, JF, 1789) (E)	148
Surf scoter	Melanitta perspicillata (Linnaeus, 1758)	149
Velvet scoter	Melanitta fusca (Linnaeus, 1758)	150
White-winged scoter	Melanitta deglandi (Bonaparte, 1850)	151
Stejneger's scoter	Melanitta stejnegeri (Ridgway, 1887)	152
Common scoter	Melanitta nigra (Linnaeus, 1758)	153
Black scoter	Melanitta americana (Swainson, 1832)	154
Long-tailed duck	Clangula hyemalis (Linnaeus, 1758)	155
Bufflehead	Bucephala albeola (Linnaeus, 1758)	156
Common goldeneye	Bucephala clangula (Linnaeus, 1758)	157
Barrow's goldeneye	Bucephala islandica (Gmelin, JF, 1789)	158
Smew	Mergellus albellus (Linnaeus, 1758)	159
Hooded merganser	Lophodytes cucullatus (Linnaeus, 1758)	160
New Zealand merganser	Mergus australis Hombron & Jacquinot, 1841 (E)	161
Brazilian merganser	Mergus octosetaceus Vieillot, 1817	162
Common merganser	Mergus merganser Linnaeus, 1758	163
Red-breasted merganser	Mergus serrator Linnaeus, 1758	164
Scaly-sided merganser	Mergus squamatus Gould, 1864	165
Black-headed duck	Heteronetta atricapilla (Merrem, 1841)	166
Masked duck	Nomonyx dominicus (Linnaeus, 1766)	167
Ruddy duck	Oxyura jamaicensis (Gmelin, JF, 1789)	168
Andean duck	Oxyura ferruginea (Eyton, 1838)	169
Lake duck	Oxyura vittata (Philippi, 1860)	170
Blue-billed duck	Oxyura australis Gould, 1837	171
Maccoa duck	Oxyura maccoa (Eyton, 1838)	172
White-headed duck	Oxyura leucocephala (Scopoli, 1769)	173
Musk duck	Biziura lobata (Shaw, 1796)	174
