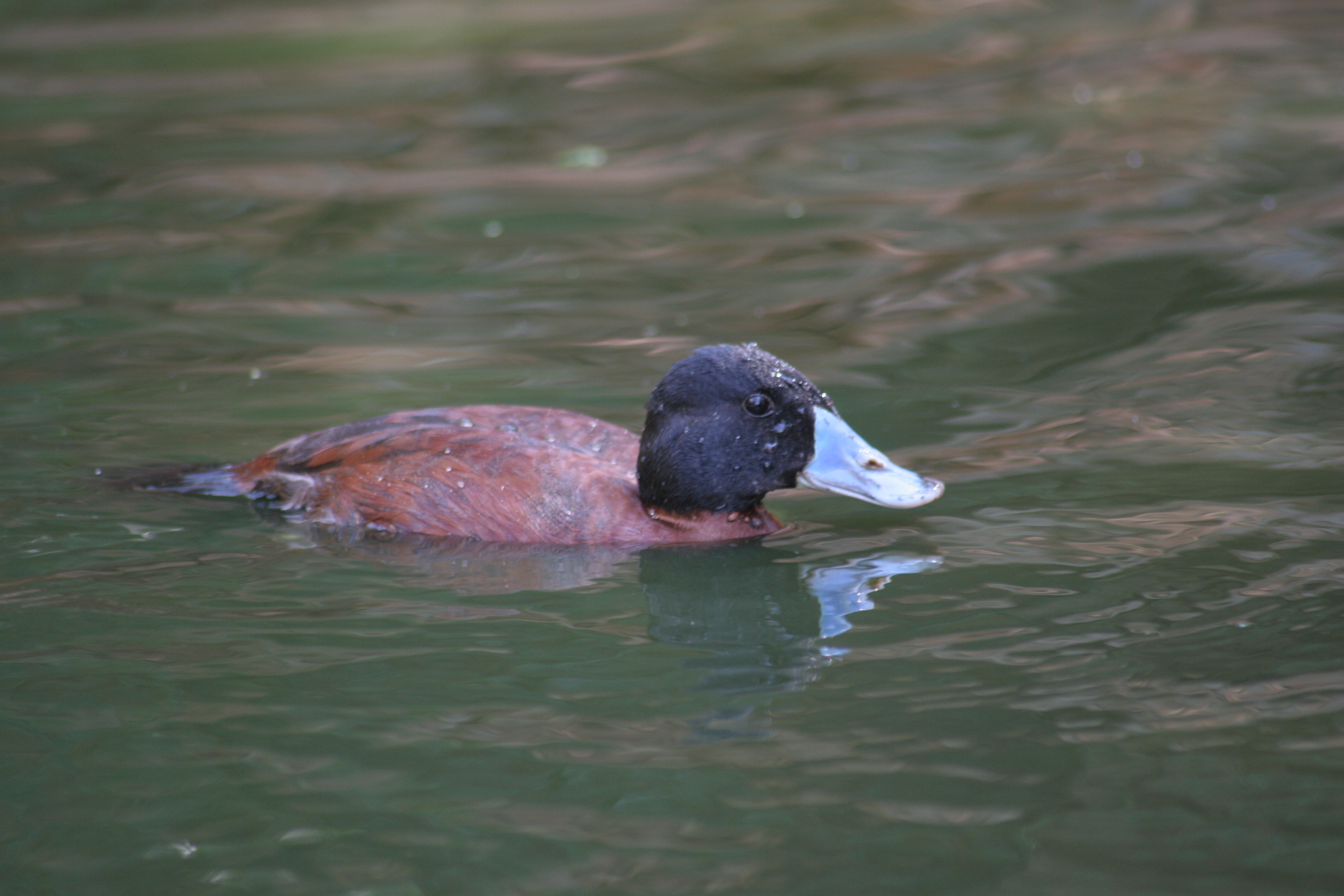
- O. maccoa, male

Conservation status
- Endangered (IUCN 3.1)

Scientific classification
- Kingdom: Animalia
- Phylum: Chordata
- Class: Aves
- Order: Anseriformes
- Family: Anatidae
- Genus: Oxyura
- Species: O. maccoa

Binomial name
- Oxyura maccoa (Eyton, 1838)
- Oxyura maccoa range Extant (resident)

Synonyms
- Erismatura maccoa Eyton, 1838

= Maccoa duck =

Species of bird

The Maccoa duck (Oxyura maccoa) is a stiff-tailed diving duck found across Eastern and Southern Africa.

== Description ==
As members of the stiff-tailed duck group, Maccoas are often found wading in the water with their tail feathers cocked upwards. As diving ducks, their bodies are specialized for being agile underwater swimmers and thus have sacrificed the characteristics that allow them to move well on land. As a result, their legs are set further back on their bodies which makes them awkward when walking out of water.

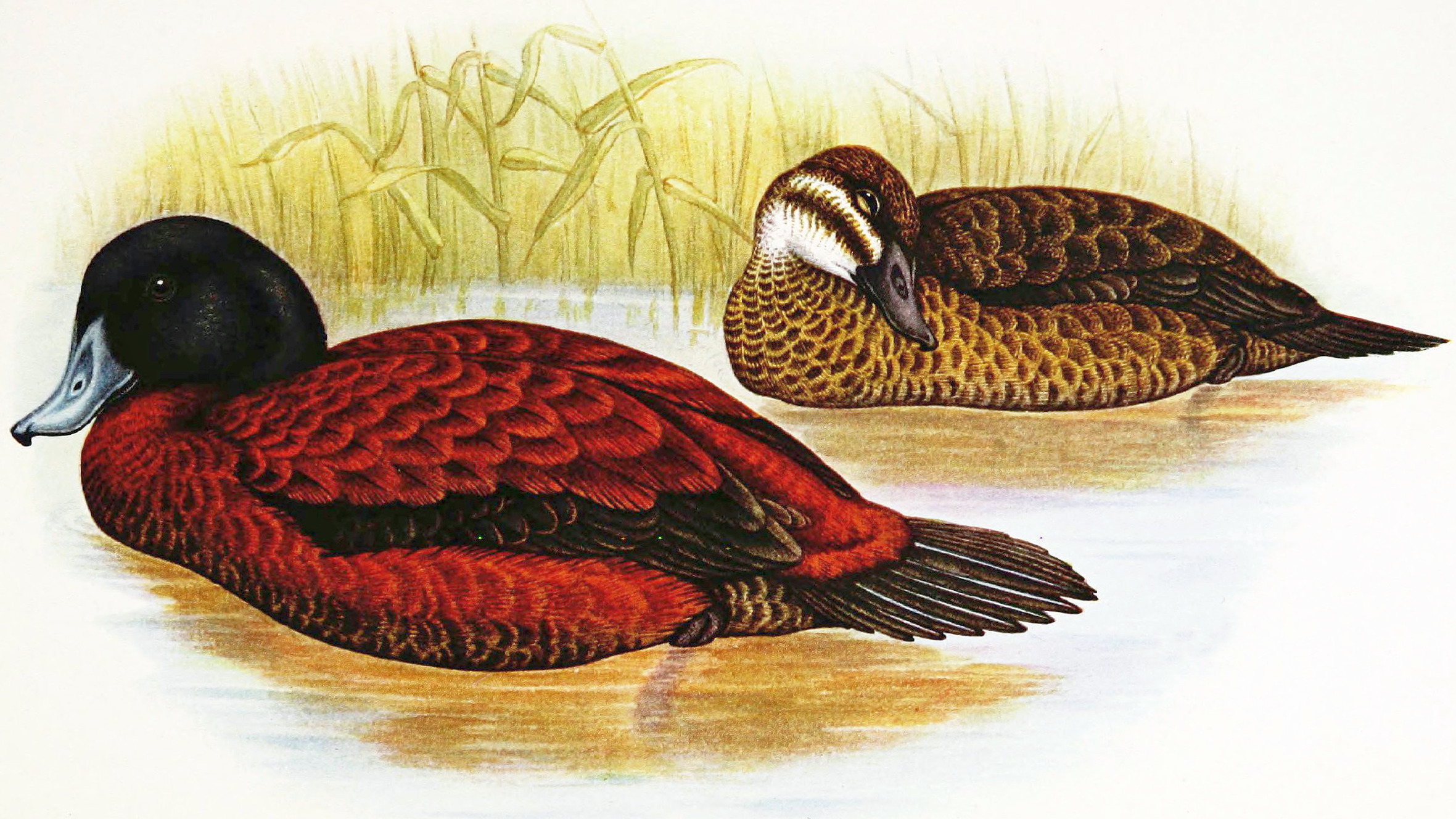
Male (left) and female (right) Maccoa ducks.

=== Male ===
The breeding male Maccoa stands out with its cobalt blue bill extending from a completely black head and throat. The breast and back are chestnut coloured while the underparts are often greyish-brown, the rump is dark brown, and the tail and feet are black. In flight, the male's off-white underwing feathers and white axillaries can be seen. Non-breeding males closely resemble the females, except for a few points: a darker crown and hints of chestnut colour on the back.

=== Female ===
The female Maccoa is less colourful. It boasts a greyish-black bill with a light tip, and a light brown face with a dark crown and cheek stripe, and an off-white throat. The female also has a light brown breast, darker brown back, off-white underparts, black feet and black tail feathers.

=== Juvenile ===
As with many birds, juvenile Maccoa ducks have similar plumage to adult females. However, their tail feathers are slimmer and notched, and their crowns are a darker brown.

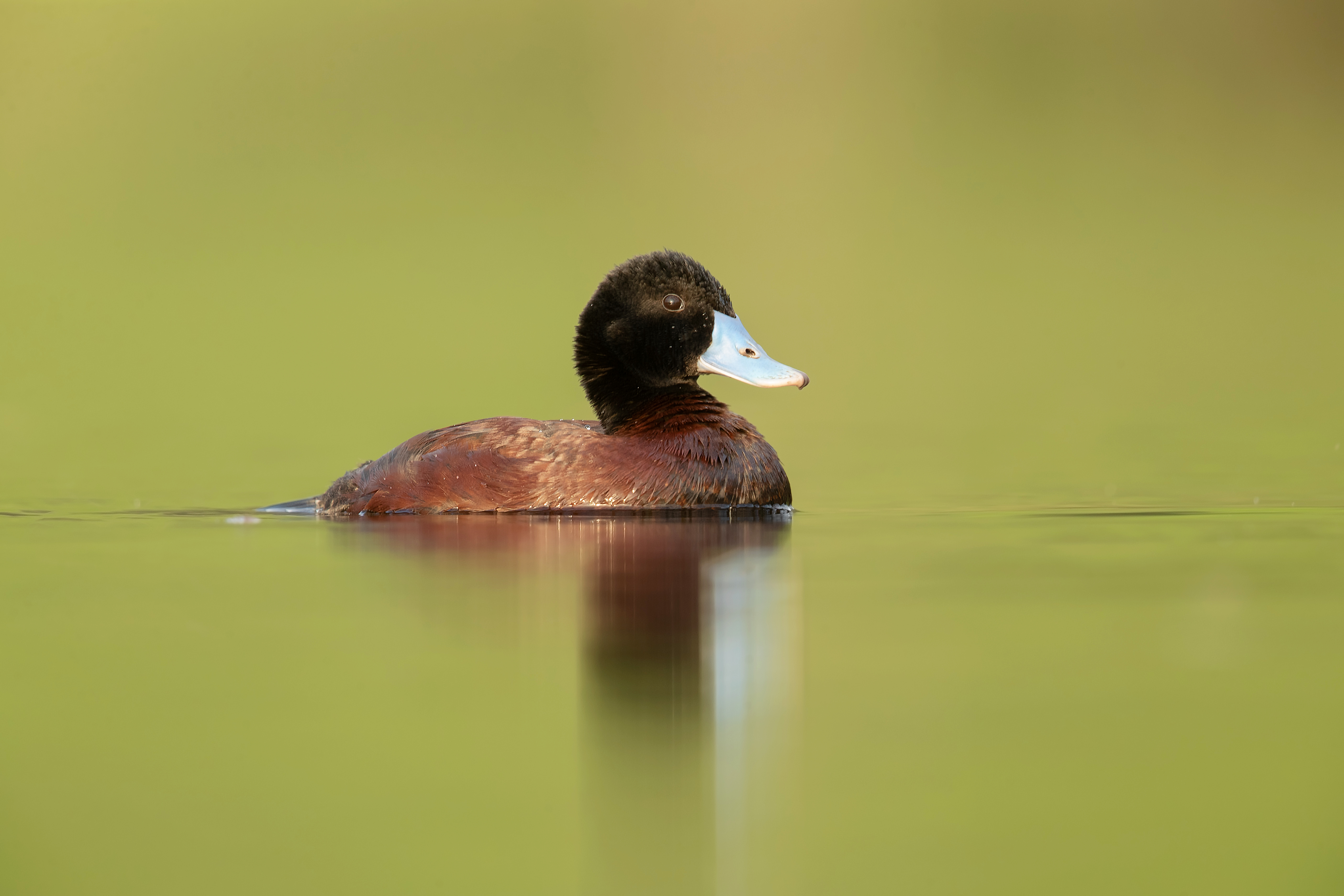
The blue-billed duck (Oxyura australis)

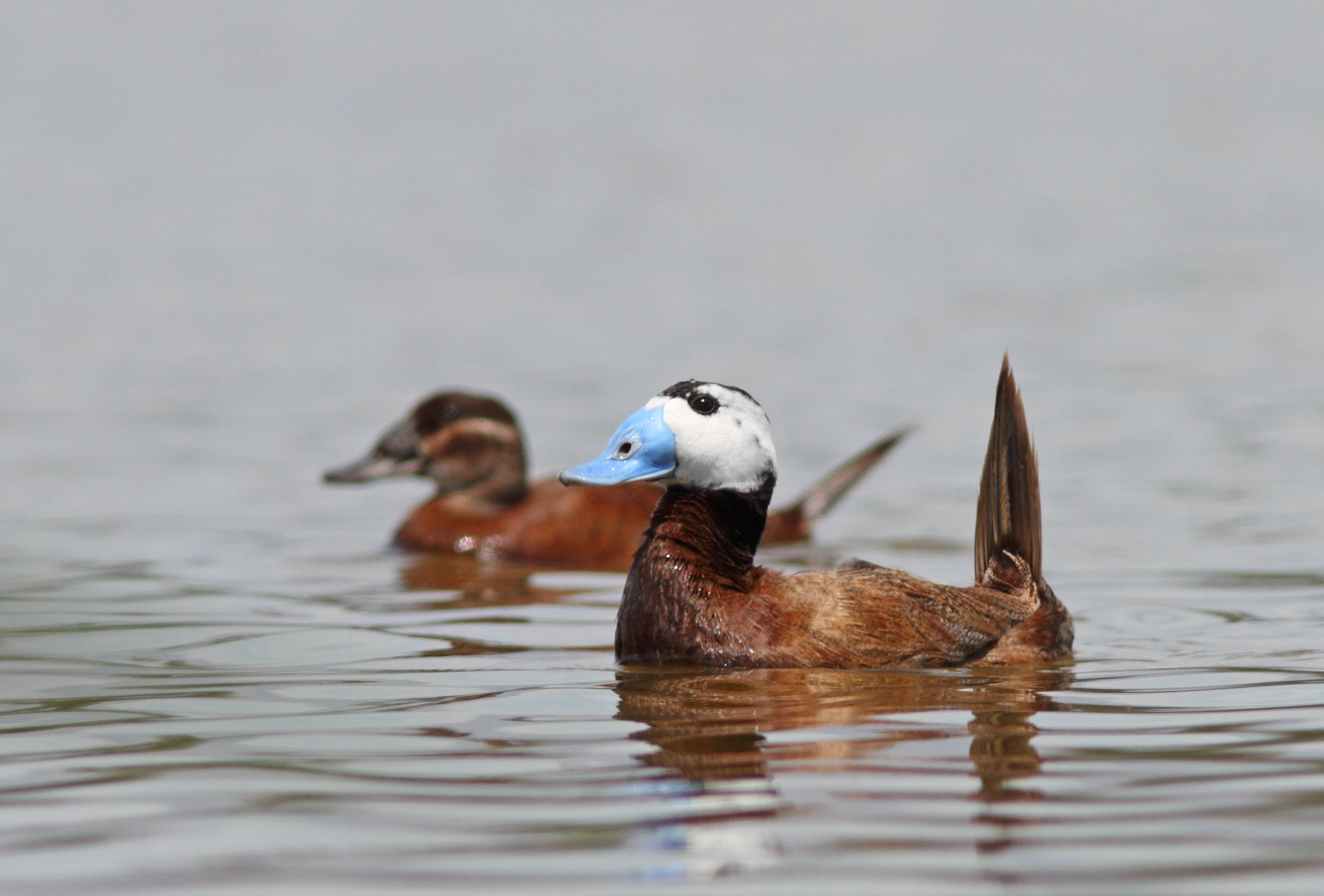
The white-headed duck (Oxyura leucocephala)

== Taxonomy and systematics ==
The Oxyura genus is commonly referred to as stiff-tailed ducks. It is widely agreed that Oxyura and Nomonyx (a genus with a single species - the masked duck - Nomonyx dominicus) are sister groups, and these results have been shown in both trait-based and genome-based phylogenies over the past 30 years. This genus has been separated into 2 groups: the Old World ducks consist of O. maccoa, O. leucocephala (white-headed duck), and O. australis (blue-billed duck), and the New World ducks are O. vittata (lake duck), O. jamaicensis (ruddy duck), and O. ferruginea (andean duck). The exact relationships between the different species of Oxyura are still undetermined.

In 1995, a phylogenetic tree based solely on comparative traits suggested that O. maccoa and O. leucocephala were most closely related, while O. australis was put into a separate clade along with the New World species O. vittata, O. jamaicensis, and O. ferruginea. More recently, genetic analyses have found strong evidence that O. maccoa, O. australis, and O. leucocephala are more closely related to one another than they are to O. vittata, O. jamaicensis, and O. ferruginea; however, the shape of their Old World clade and their evolutionary relationships relative to one another still remain unsolved. More recent studies have focused on comparing different genes across species, but these methods still yield conflicting results. Analyses examining mitochondrial DNA samples indicate that it is most likely O. leucocephala diverged first and that O. maccoa and O. australis share the most recent common ancestor. On the other hand, analyses comparing nuclear DNA show maximum likelihood that O. australis was the first to diverge and that O. maccoa and O. leucocephala are the closest relatives. Furthermore, other types of analyses in this same study continue to go back and forth between the two possibilities, thus confirming that the true evolutionary history of these 3 species is still unknown.

== Habitat and distribution ==
Outside of the breeding season, Maccoa ducks tend to occupy inland waters - ranging from fresh to brackish - which are filled with nutrients. This includes lakes, ponds, salty flooded water pans, dams, river mouths, and even sewage ponds. All of these places provide ample space for the Maccoa to land, take off, and of course dive underwater for its food.

While breeding, these ducks enjoy similar habitats to those described above, but with one exception. A critical component of breeding grounds for Maccoas is the presence of both open freshwater and some adjacent emerging vegetation. These ducks have been found to especially prefer Typha species in their breeding habitats, and will usually build their nests in hidden bundles of these reeds.

As mentioned, the Maccoa duck is found throughout the southern and eastern countries of Africa. It is considered a sedentary species, meaning it does not migrate for winters or breeding, and simply moves around to find new wetlands for food and nesting. The main populations throughout Africa are spread quite far apart with large spatial gaps between them - this is likely because there is a lack of desirable wetland habitats for the ducks due to climatic variation across the continent. The global population in 2012 was believed to be ~11 000, and approximately 75% of these resided in southern Africa at the time; South Africa alone is still home to half of the global Maccoa population.

While many bird species can be negatively impacted by human disturbances and land-use change, Maccoa ducks have found a silver lining to water management techniques and human infrastructure. Many big groups of this species have been found living behind dams across Namibia - namely the Friedenau Dam, Borodino Dam, and the Walvis Bay Sewage Works. These large dams provide deep freshwater habitats for these diving ducks and may actually prove to be a benefit for the conservation of this species.

== Behaviour ==
=== Vocalizations ===
When putting on their mating displays, males will often give out short whistles or will produce a prrrr'ing sound for 2 or 3 seconds.

When feeling threatened, both males and females will emit low grunts.

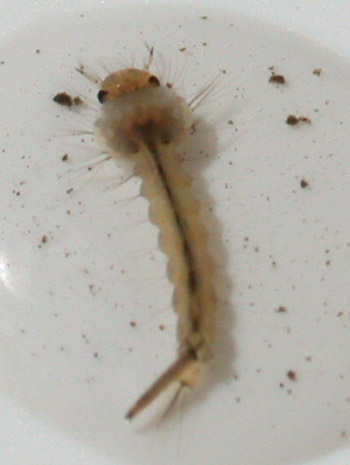
Mosquito larva. A member of the Diptera order.

=== Diet ===
The Maccoa duck is an omnivore whose diet consists primarily of aquatic invertebrates and plants. The average dive lasts about 15 to 22 seconds, and it uses this time to fill its bill with dark debris sitting at the bottom of the lake or pond – a perfect habitat for many invertebrates. It then uses its mouth to sift through the material and keep the desired seeds, vegetation, and insects.

When foraging underwater for vegetation, Maccoa ducks will eat a variety of plants - but seem to prefer species from the Persicaria and Polygonum genera - and will feed on their seeds, roots, and other plant debris. These ducks will also predate on multiple stage classes of aquatic invertebrate species, including Tubifex worms, Diptera larvae, and Daphnia eggs. Other invertebrates on the Maccoa duck's menu include gastropods and ostracods.

=== Reproduction ===
This species mates and lays its eggs typically between January and May, and spends this time in small, defended freshwater habitats with emerging vegetation, as mentioned above.

The male Maccoa ducks are polygynous - meaning a single male will mate with multiple females - and they aggressively defend their breeding territory. These males do not provide any help with nest building or parental care. After mating, females remain in the male's territory and either build a new nest out of sedges, reeds, and down, or sometimes occupy the pre-existing nests of coots and grebes. Clutches are typically 5 or 6 eggs, but can reach up to 12 when females put their own eggs in another female's nest. In addition to this egg dumping, female Maccoas have also been observed abandoning their young both before and during incubation periods. The incubation period typically lasts from 25 to 27 days, but the fledging period is not well understood. Chicks are born with dark legs, feet, and bills, a white face, and are covered in grey-brown down.

Interestingly, the breeding plumage of male Maccoa ducks can be influenced by their social rank. A study of captive Maccoa ducks in 1985 found that submissive males who were aggressively hassled by more dominant males had a lower social ranking, and these same males actually failed to acquire flashy and bright breeding plumage.

== Status and threats ==
=== Pollution ===
Unlike most other ducks who have a vegetarian diet, Maccoa ducks are omnivores who feed on plants as well as invertebrates. As a result, they are put in relatively high trophic positions compared to other ducks. For this reason, the species is more vulnerable to pollution because of the bioaccumulation and magnification of toxins in their diet. The most common sources of these dangerous pollutants are pesticides and herbicides carried in runoff from surrounding farms.

=== Climate change ===
As the global climate continues to warm, it is likely that the wetlands of southern Africa which Maccoas depend on will start to dry up. Without such important breeding habitats, it can be expected that this species will soon show greater declines in their populations.

=== Bycatch ===
A less prominent but still relevant threat to the Maccoa duck is accidental capture in gill nets. This has become more common as the need to catch fish to feed the growing human population continues to rise. This issue seems to be more relevant to eastern Africa populations who reside on large lakes.
