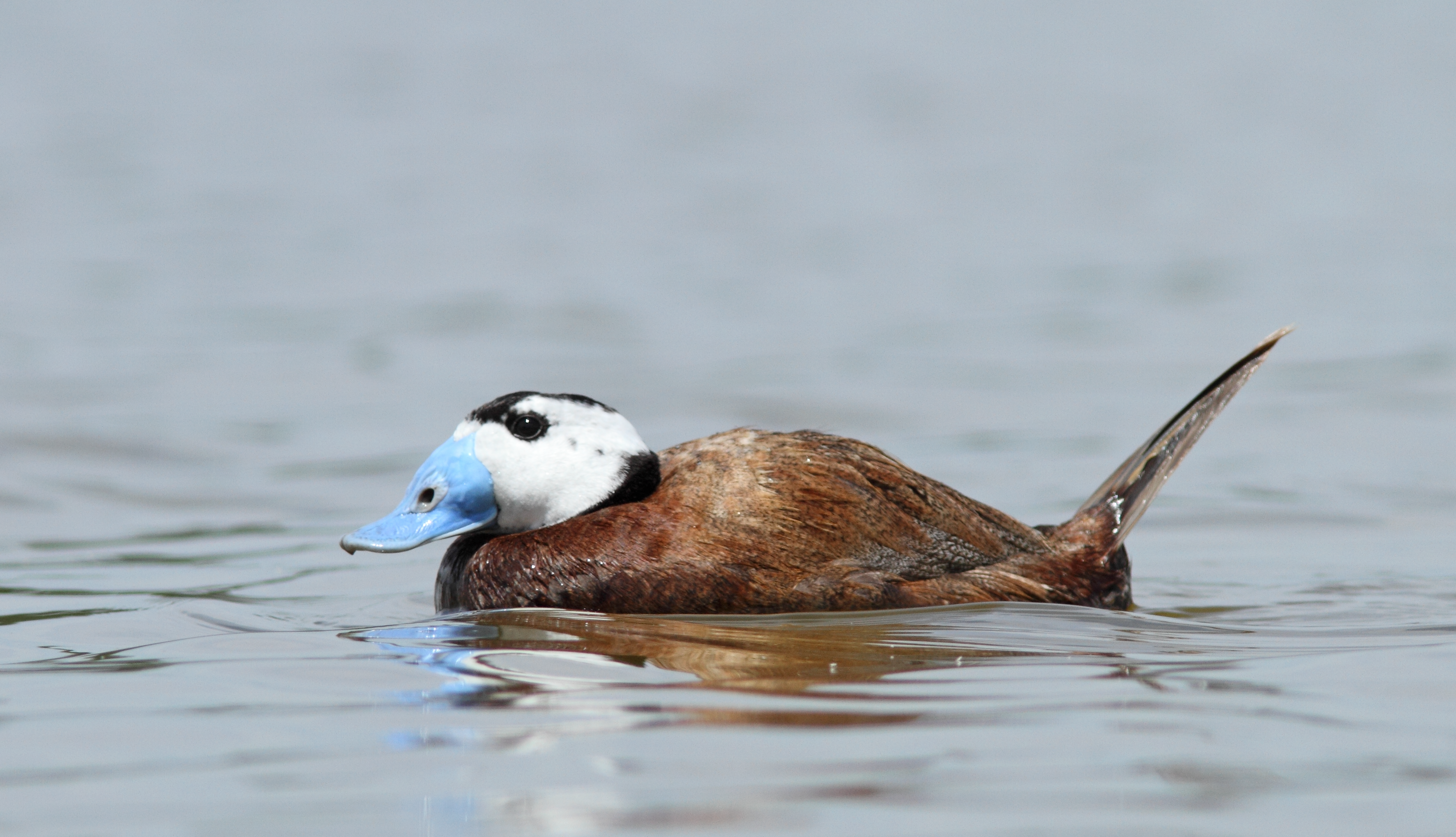
- Breeding male, Andalusia, Spain
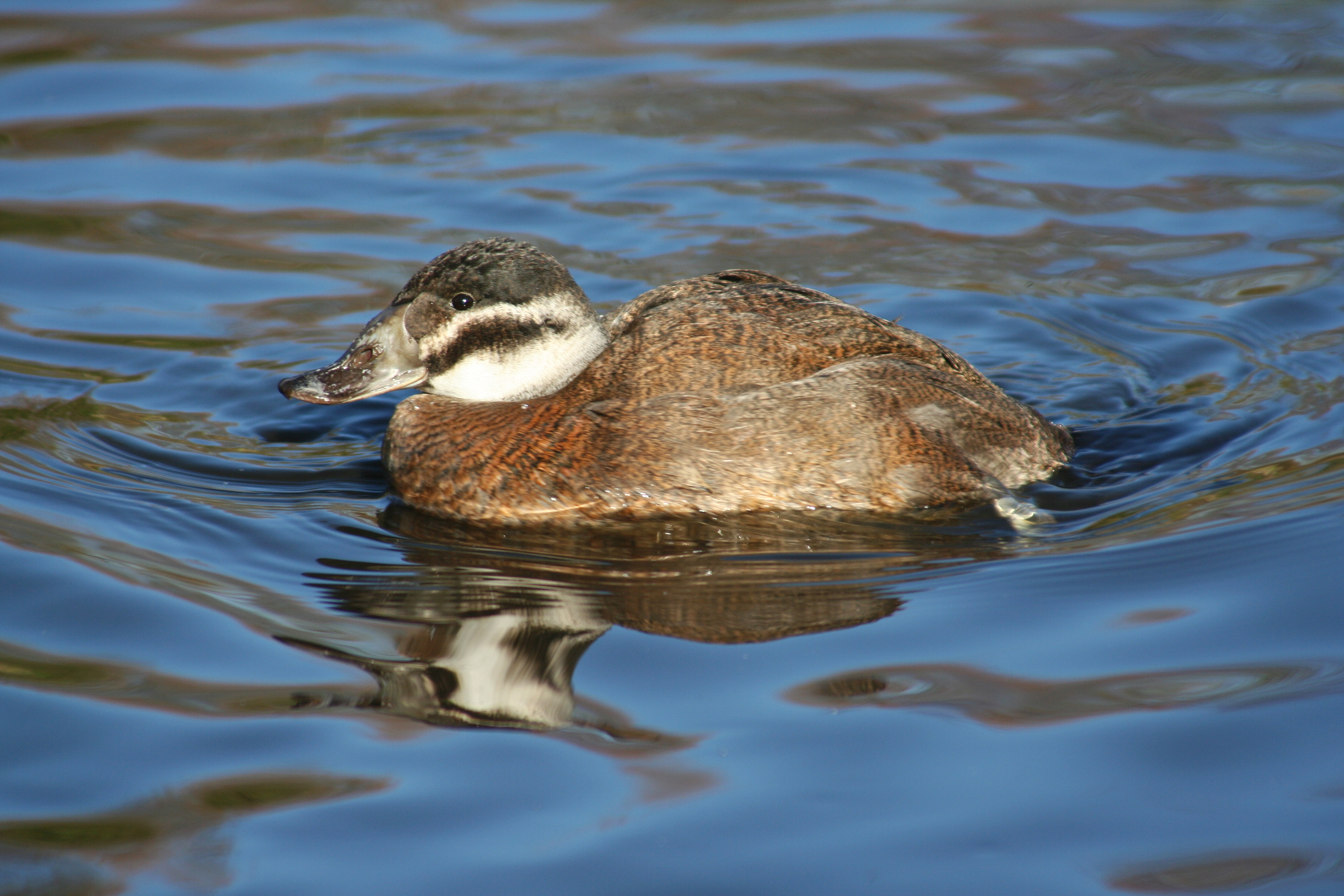
- Female

Conservation status
- Endangered (IUCN 3.1)
- CITES Appendix II

Scientific classification
- Kingdom: Animalia
- Phylum: Chordata
- Class: Aves
- Order: Anseriformes
- Family: Anatidae
- Genus: Oxyura
- Species: O. leucocephala

Binomial name
- Oxyura leucocephala (Scopoli, 1769)
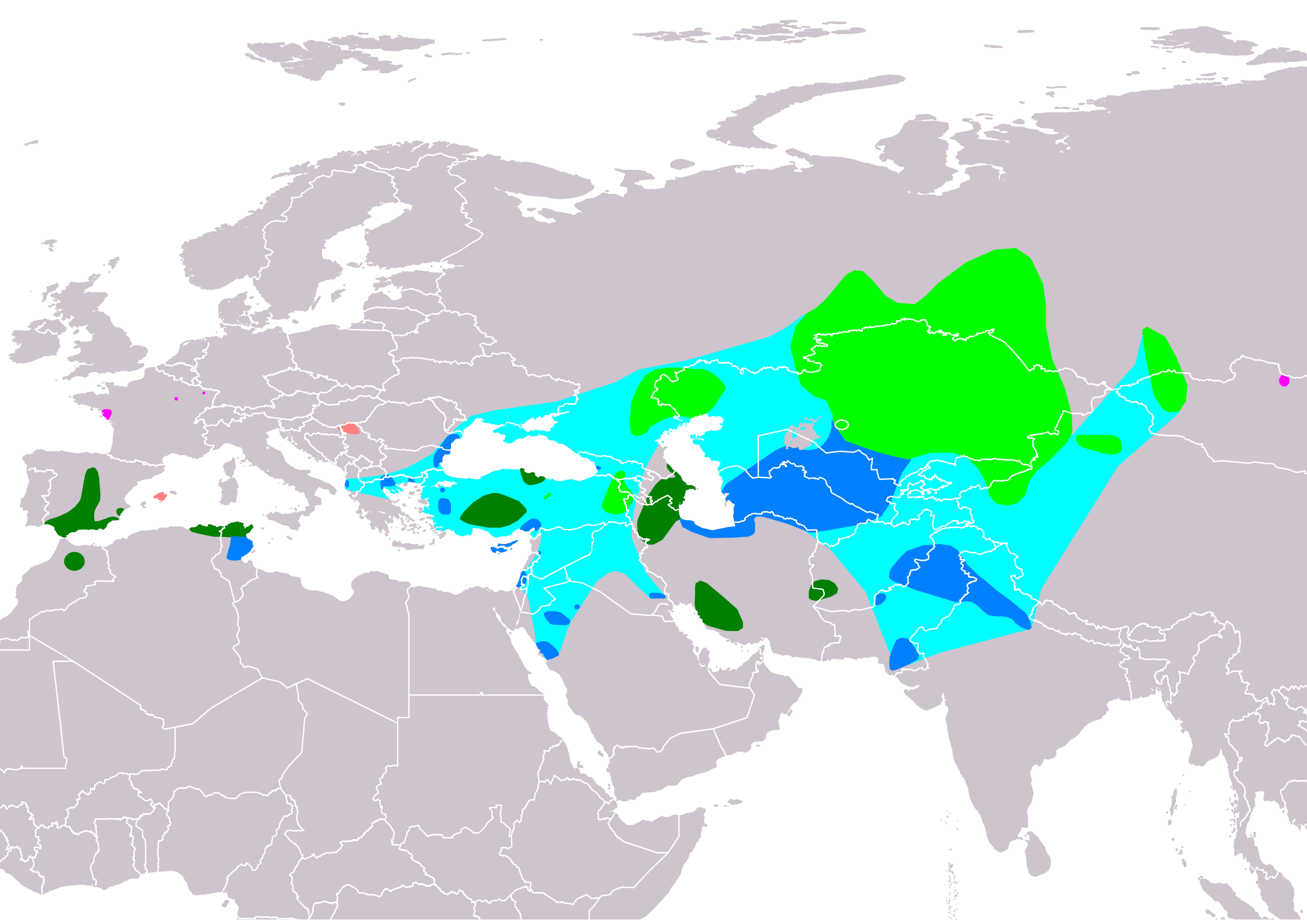
- Oxyura leucocephala range Breeding Resident Non-breeding Passage Vagrant (seasonality uncertain) Probably extinct

= White-headed duck =

Species of bird

The white-headed duck (Oxyura leucocephala) is a small diving duck some 45 cm (18 in) long. The male has a white head with a black crown, a blue bill, and reddish-grey plumage. The female has a dark bill and rather duller colouring. Its breeding habitat is lakes with open water and dense vegetation at the margin. It dives under water and feeds on aquatic vegetation as well as some animal matter. It is more likely to swim away from a perceived threat than to fly. This duck is known from Spain, North Africa, Western Asia and Central Asia. Populations are declining, mostly due to loss of habitat and pollution, and the International Union for Conservation of Nature has rated the bird's status as "endangered".

== Taxonomy and systematics ==
The white-headed duck was originally described as Anas leucocephala by Giovani Antonio Scopoli in 1769. It is currently in the genus Oxyura. Other generic synonyms used in the past include Erismatura, Cerconectes, Gymnura, Undina, Bythonessa, Plectrura, and Pervicauda. Other junior synonyms for the species include Anas mersa, Anas vindila, Anas ruthenica, and Oxyura unifasciata. Its scientific name comes from the Greek Oxyura (from oxus, "sharp", and oura, "tail") and leucocephala (from leukos, "white" and kephalos, "head". The common name white-headed duck, like the specific name, refers to its white head.

It interbreeds with other species in its genus, such as the ruddy duck. The hybrids are fully fertile and capable of having viable offspring with both parent species.

The species is monotypic. Different populations of the white-headed duck do not display significant genetic differences. However, some studies have found that they do display morphological differences, with western populations being larger in size, having darker ventral coloration, and males having more yellow feathers on their back. Dark phase birds have only been found in the western populations.

In the genus Oxyura, it is generally thought to be related most closely to Maccoa duck. Some studies have also found that these two species form a clade with the blue-billed duck, although this is disputed and species relations between Oxyura ducks are unresolved.

== Description ==
Adult males have a grey and reddish body, a blue bill and a largely white head with a black cap and neck. Adult females have a grey-brown body with a white face and a darker bill, cap, and cheek stripe. Length is 43–48 cm (17–19 in) and weight is 580–750 g (1.28–1.65 lb).

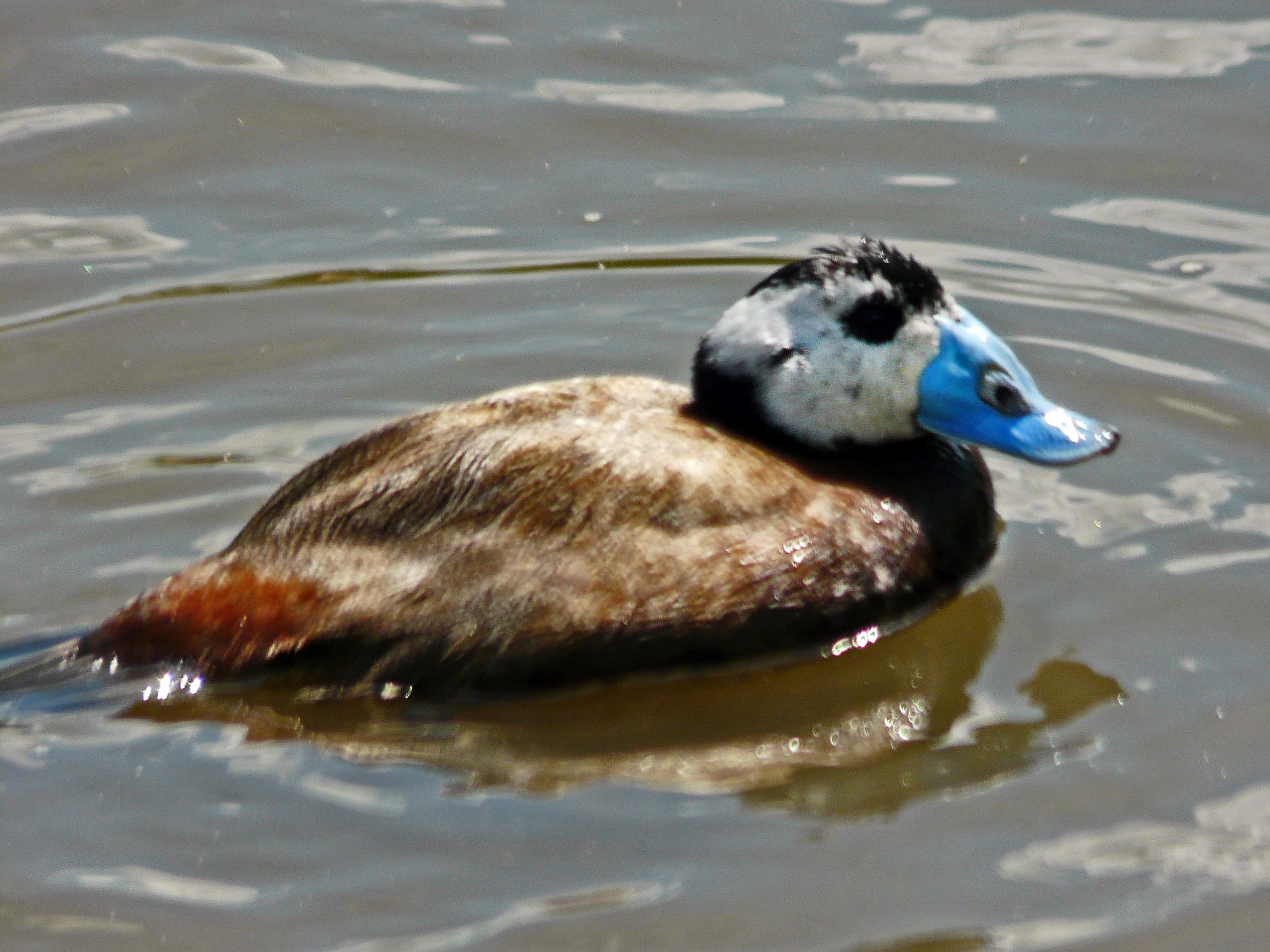
Male in winter

== Distribution and habitat ==
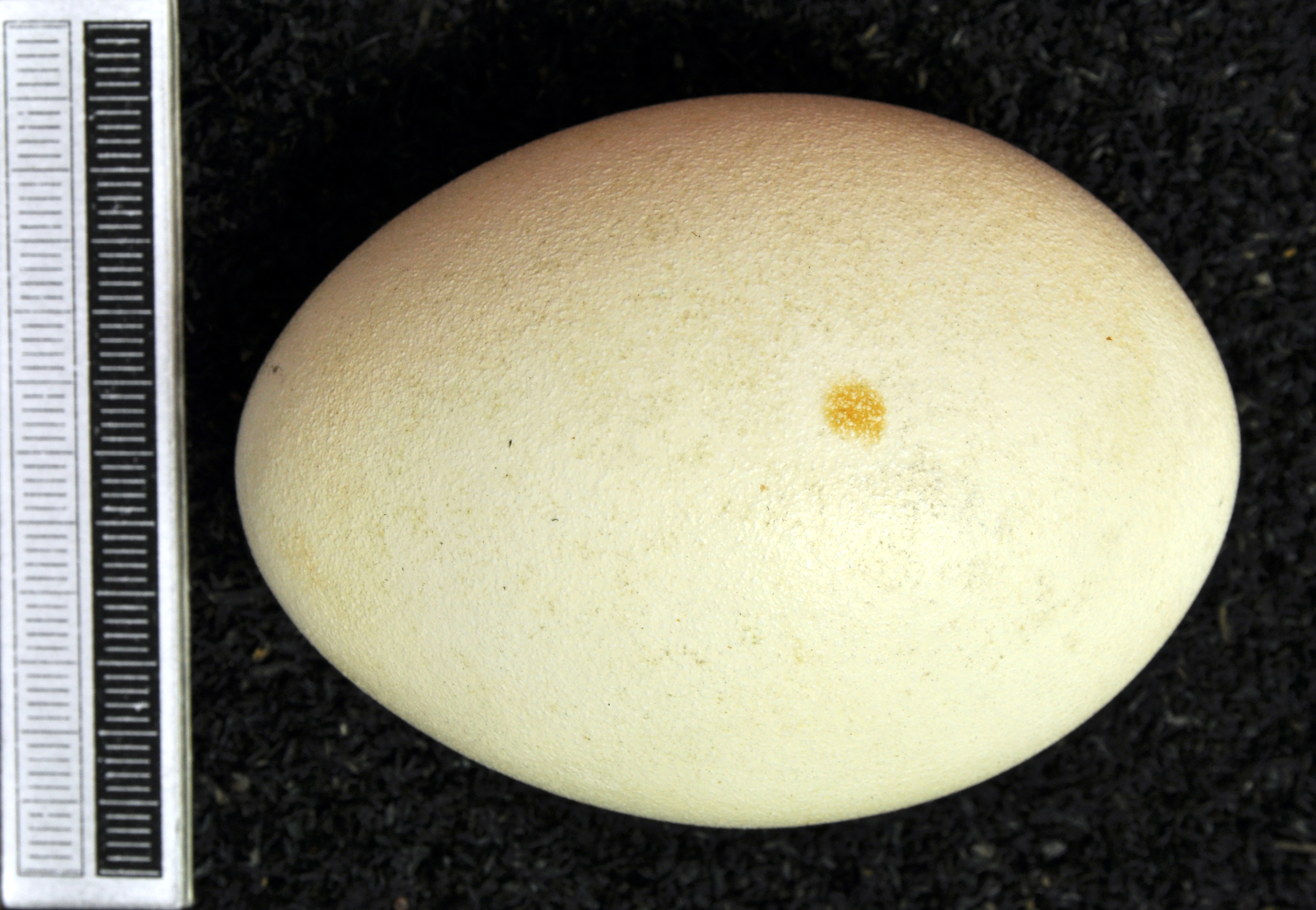
Egg, collection Museum Wiesbaden

This duck breeds in Spain and North Africa, with a larger population in western and central Asia. Their breeding habitat is large tracts of open water, such as lakes and ponds including artificial water bodies, with dense stands of aquatic plants to provide shelter and nesting sites. Individuals are fairly frequently reported well north of their breeding range, but as with many wildfowl, the status of these extralimital records is clouded by the possibility of escapes from collections.

== Behaviour and ecology ==
=== Diet ===
These birds dive and swim under water. They are omnivorous, with vegetable matter predominating. They are reluctant to fly, preferring to swim for cover.

== Conservation ==
This duck is considered endangered due to a large reduction in populations in the last 10 years. Most of this decline is due to habitat loss and hunting, but interbreeding of the Spanish population with the introduced ruddy duck (Oxyura jamaicensis) is a more recent threat. This has led to the attempted eradication of the American species from western Europe.

The white-headed duck is one of the species to which the Agreement on the Conservation of African-Eurasian Migratory Waterbirds (AEWA) applies, and the International Union for Conservation of Nature has rated the bird's conservation status as being "endangered".
