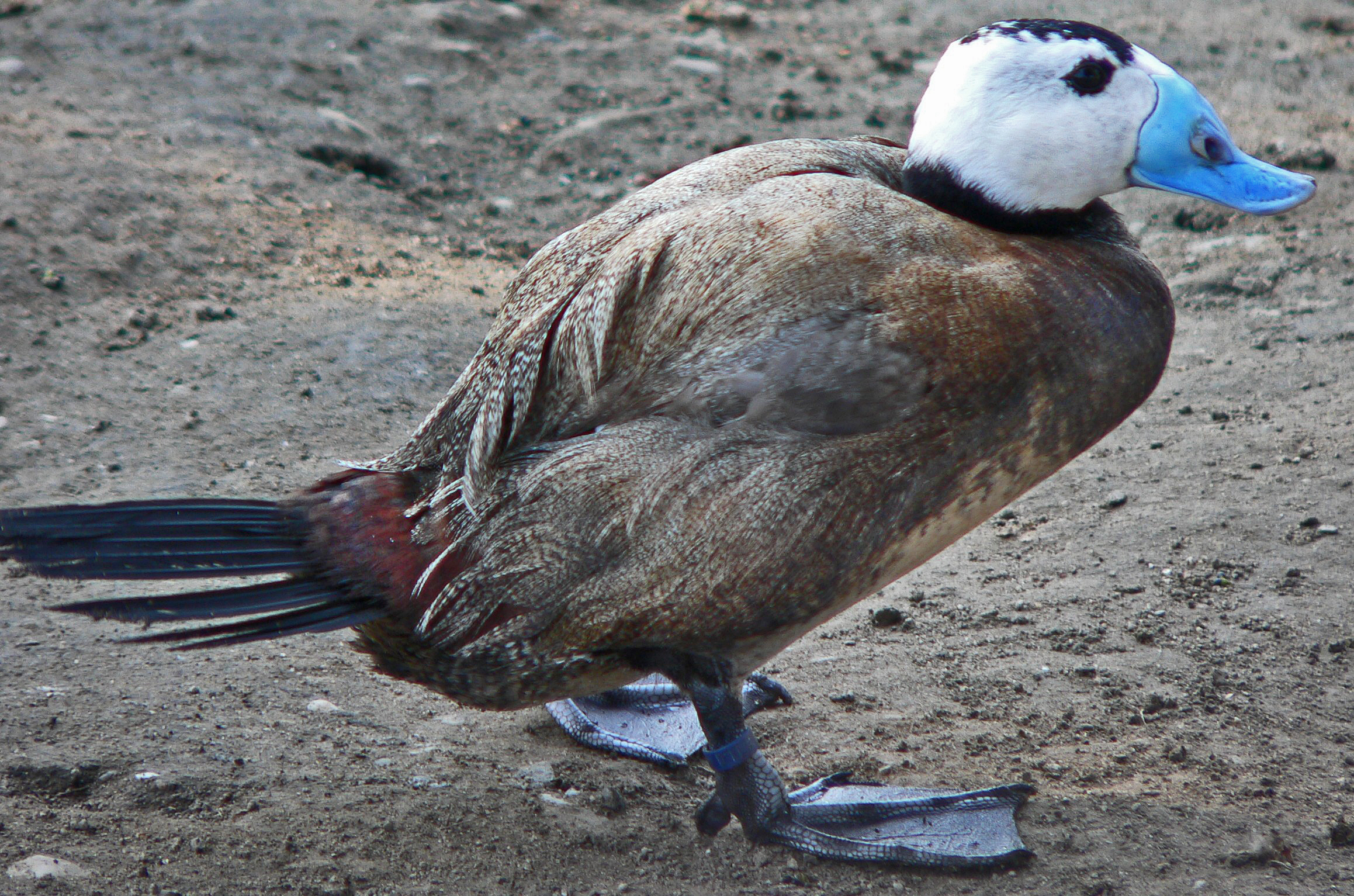
- Male white-headed duck, Oxyura leucocephala

Scientific classification
- Kingdom: Animalia
- Phylum: Chordata
- Class: Aves
- Order: Anseriformes
- Family: Anatidae
- Tribe: Oxyurini
- Genus: Oxyura; Bonaparte, 1828

Type species
- Anas rubidus (ruddy duck) Wilson, 1814

Species
- Oxyura australis Oxyura jamaicensis Oxyura leucocephala Oxyura maccoa Oxyura vittata †Oxyura vantetsi
- Key: Oxyura vittata Oxyura ferruginea Oxyura maccoa Oxyura leucocephala Oxyura jamaicensis Oxyura australis

= Stiff-tailed duck =

Stiff-tailed duck Temporal range: Early Miocene to present

Genus of birds

The stiff-tailed ducks, the genus Oxyura, are part of the Oxyurini tribe of ducks.

All ducks in the genus have, as their name implies, long, stiff tail feathers which are erect when the bird is resting. They all have relatively large, swollen bills. These are freshwater diving ducks. Their legs are set far back, which makes them awkward on land and they rarely leave the water.

Their uncommon displays involve drumming noises from inflatable throat sacs, throwing its head back, and erect short crests on its head. Plumage sequences are complicated and aging difficult. Plumage is vital for survival because the bird spends most of its time in the water.

== Taxonomy ==
The genus Oxyura was introduced (as a subgenus) in 1828 by the French naturalist Charles Lucien Bonaparte to accommodate a single taxon, Anas rubidus Wilson, 1814. It is now considered to be a synonym of Anas jamaicensis Gmelin 1789, the ruddy duck. The genus name is derived from Ancient Greek oxus, meaning "sharp" and oura meaning "tail".

The six extant members of the genus are distributed widely throughout North America, South America, Australia, Asia, and much of Africa.

== Species ==
Genus Oxyura – Bonaparte, 1828 – six species
Common name	Scientific name and subspecies	Range	Size and ecology	IUCN status and estimated population
Blue-billed duck Male Female	Oxyura australis Gould, 1837	Australia	Size: Habitat: Diet:	LC
Ruddy duck Male Female	Oxyura jamaicensis (Gmelin, 1789)	North and South America (+ British Isles, France, & Spain (introduced))	Size: Habitat: Diet:	LC
Andean duck Male Female	Oxyura ferruginea (Eyton, 1838)	Andes Mountains of South America	Size: Habitat: Diet:	LC
White-headed duck Male Female	Oxyura leucocephala (Scopoli, 1769)	Spain, North Africa, and western and central Asia	Size: Habitat: Diet:	EN
Maccoa duck Male	Oxyura maccoa (Eyton, 1838)	eastern Africa from Sudan and Ethiopia to Tanzania and west to eastern Zaire, and southern Africa from Zimbabwe to Cape Province, South Africa	Size: Habitat: Diet:	EN
Lake duck Male Female	Oxyura vittata (Philippi, 1860)	central Chile, Argentina and southern Uruguay	Size: Habitat: Diet:	LC

A fossil species from the Late Pliocene or Early Pleistocene of Jalisco (Mexico) was described as Oxyura zapatanima. It resembled a small ruddy duck or, even more, an Argentine blue-bill.

A larger Middle Pleistocene fossil form from California was originally described as Oxyura bessomi. A re-examination of the type specimen revealed it instead most likely belongs within the genus Anas, with referred specimens lying within the range of the ruddy duck.

"Oxyura" doksana from the Early Miocene of Dolnice (Czech Republic) cannot be assigned to any anatine subfamily with certainty.
