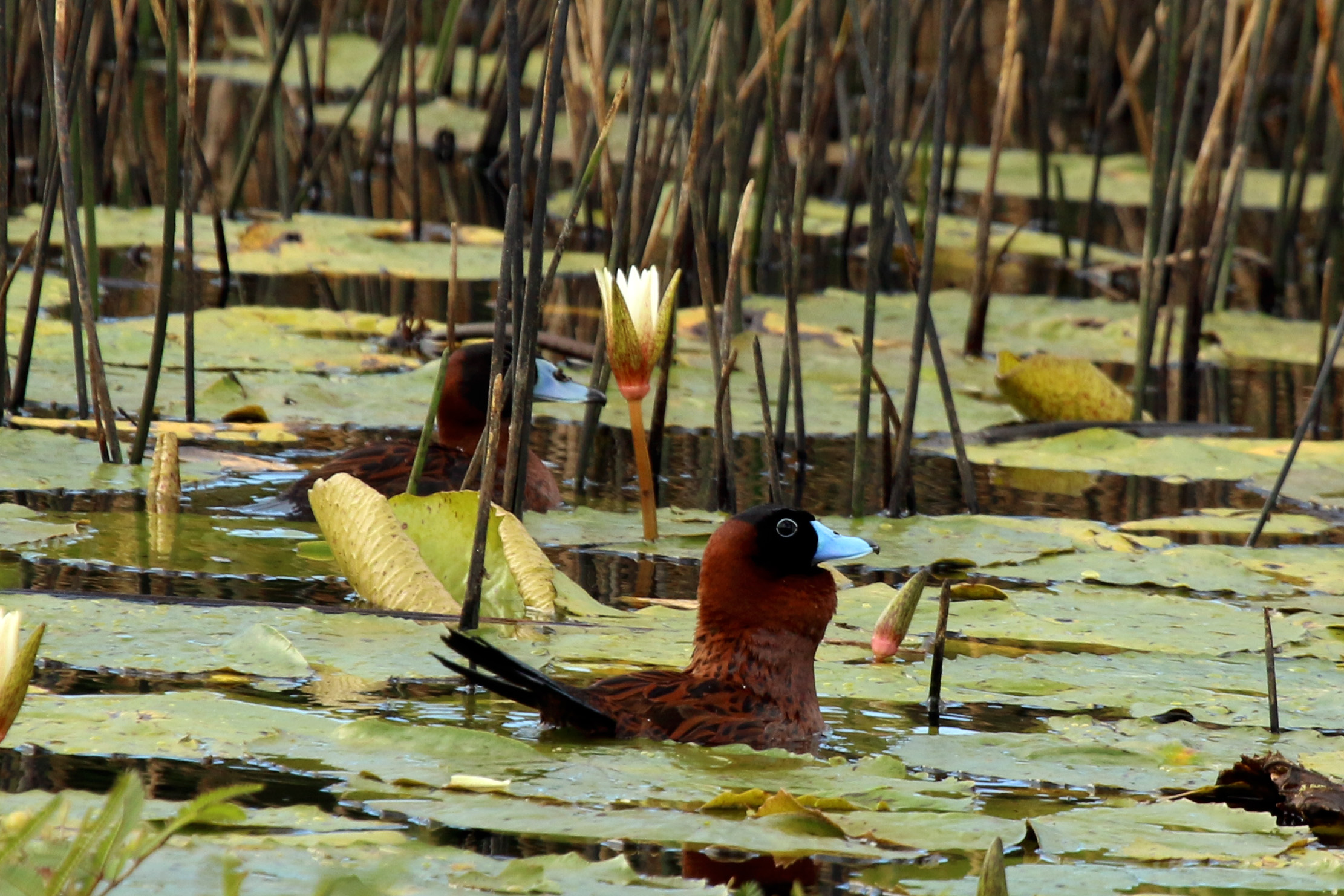
- Adult males, Tobago

Conservation status
- Least Concern (IUCN 3.1)

Scientific classification
- Kingdom: Animalia
- Phylum: Chordata
- Class: Aves
- Order: Anseriformes
- Family: Anatidae
- Genus: Nomonyx; Ridgway, 1880
- Species: N. dominicus

Binomial name
- Nomonyx dominicus (Linnaeus, 1766)

Synonyms
- Anas dominica Linnaeus, 1766; Oxyura dominica (Linnaeus, 1766)

= Masked duck =

Species of bird

The masked duck (Nomonyx dominicus) is a tiny stiff-tailed duck ranging through the tropical Americas.

== Taxonomy ==
The only member of the genus Nomonyx, it is intermediate between the rather primitive black-headed duck (Heteronetta) and the very apomorphic true stiff-tailed ducks. It is sometimes included with the latter in the genus Oxyura, but the masked ducks are now considered the descendants of a missing link in the Oxyurini evolution, having changed little for millions of years.

== Distribution and habitat ==
They are found from southern Texas and Mexico to South America and also in the Caribbean. Primarily not migratory, masked ducks are reported as very uncommon vagrants in the southernmost United States, along the Mexican border and in Florida. As of 2000, the conservation status for masked ducks in Texas is 3,800 birds. On April 1, 1962, it was recorded from Lowndes County, Georgia, where it was photographed by Alexander Wetmore. Masked ducks breed in any freshwater body with marsh vegetation and surrounded by heavy tree cover. They also occur in mangrove swamps.

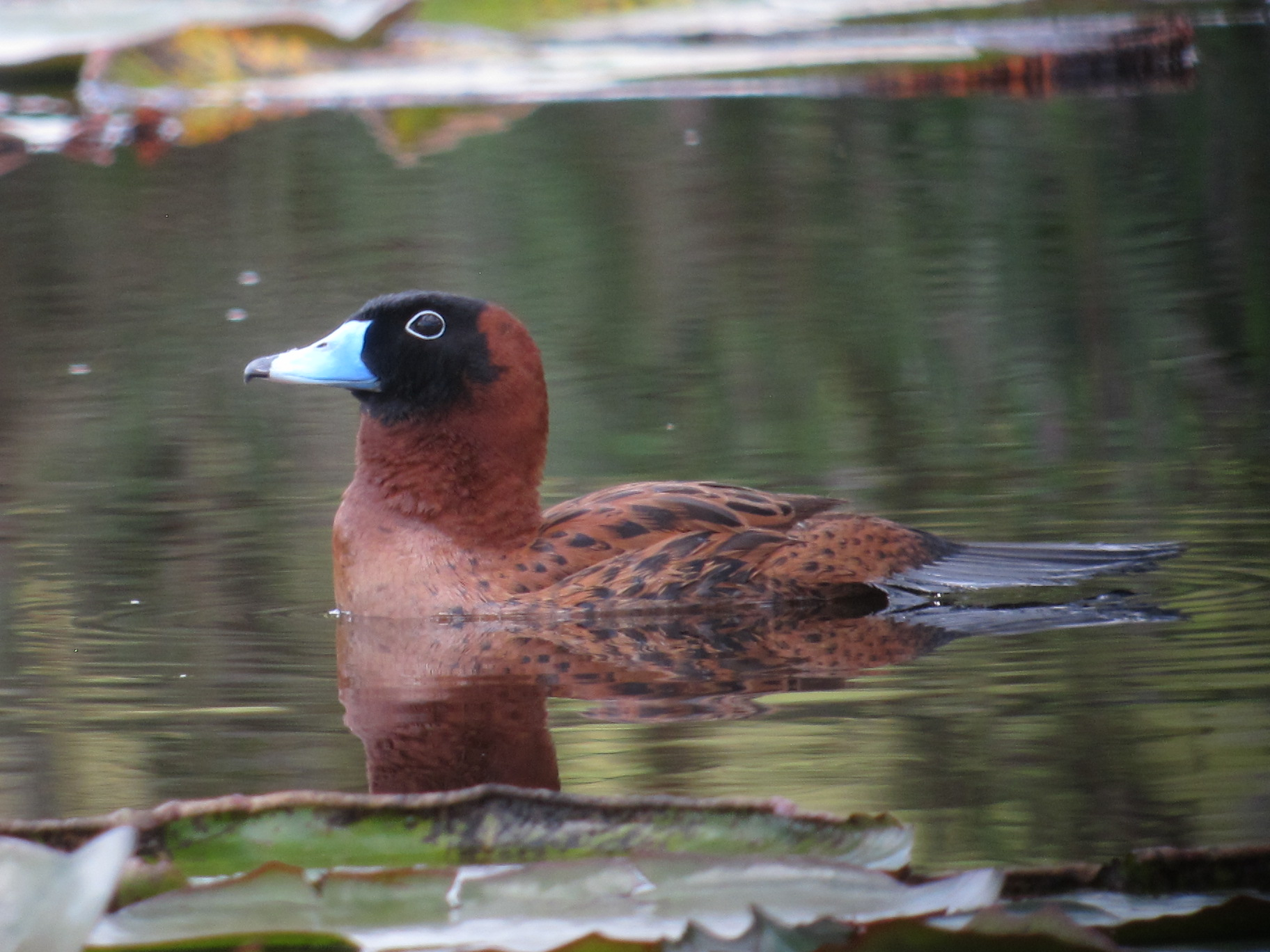
Male

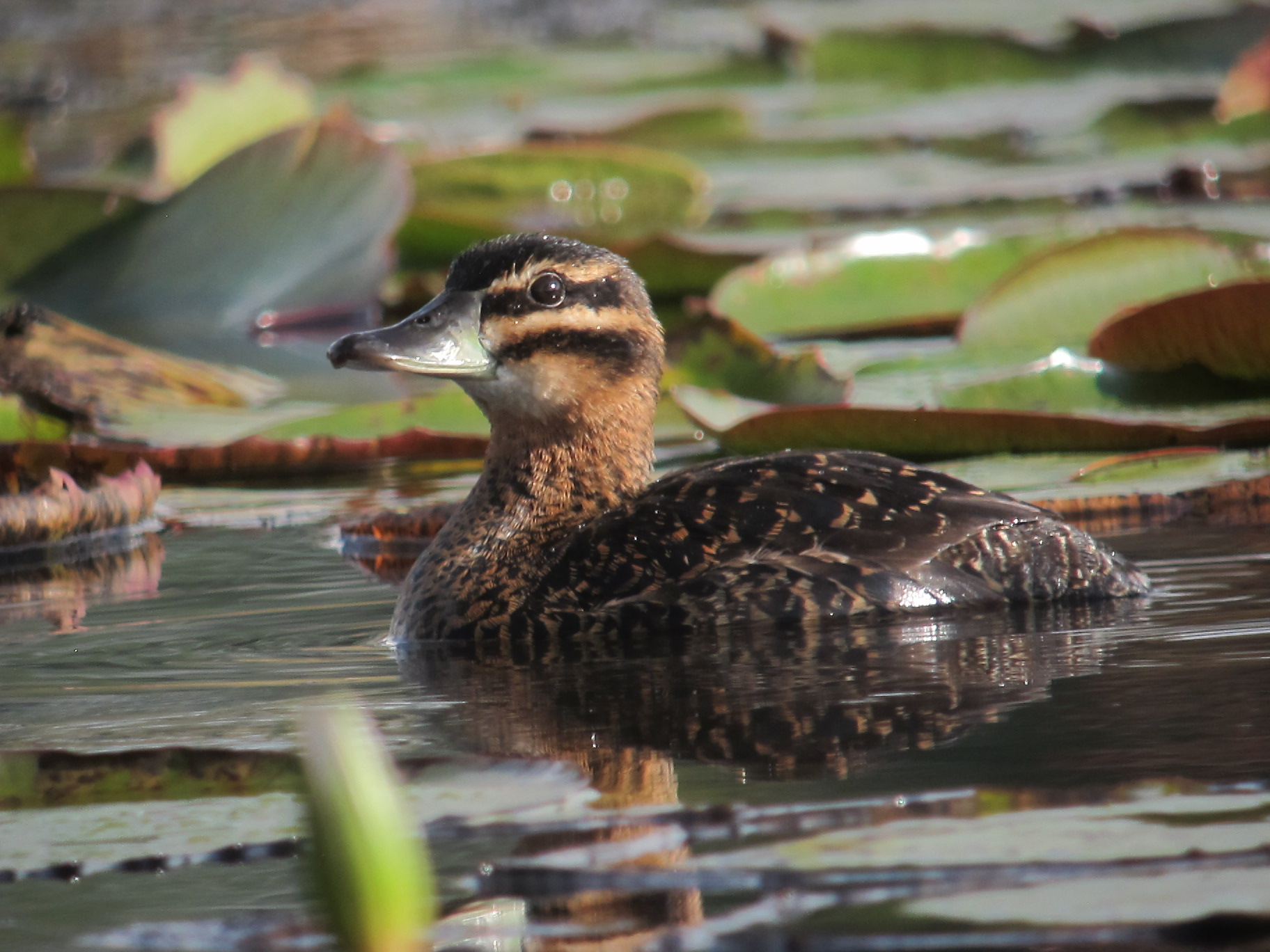
Female

== Description ==
Breeding adult males have a rust-colored body with a black face and mottled wings. Adult females, winter males, and juveniles have a barred brownish gray body, with two horizontal, dark-colored stripes running through the buff-colored face.

== Diet ==
These ducks mainly feed on seeds, roots, stems, and leaves of aquatic plants. They also eat aquatic insects and crustaceans. They feed by diving. These ducks are usually very secretive, but they are not rare and not considered threatened by the IUCN.
