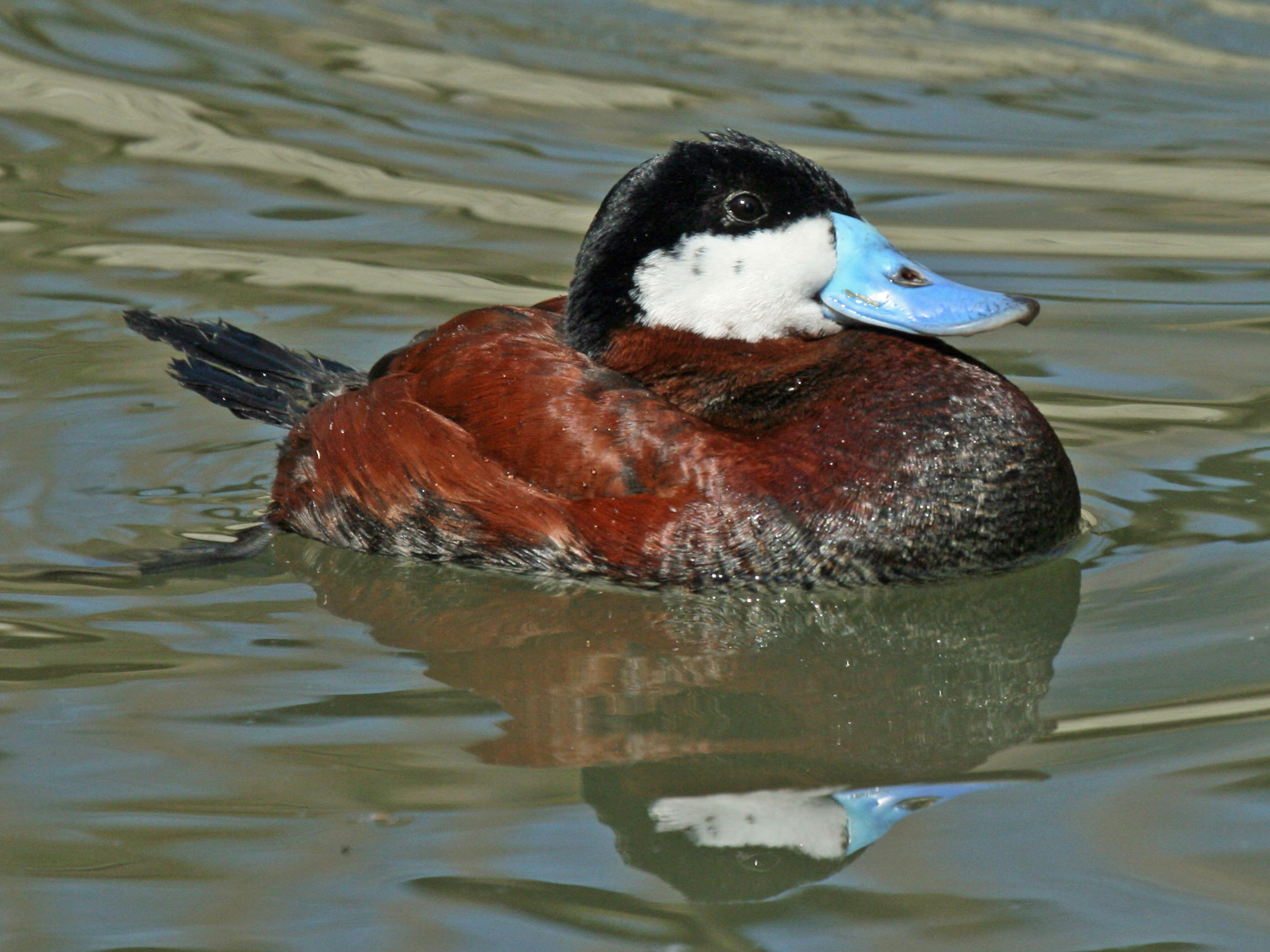
- Male
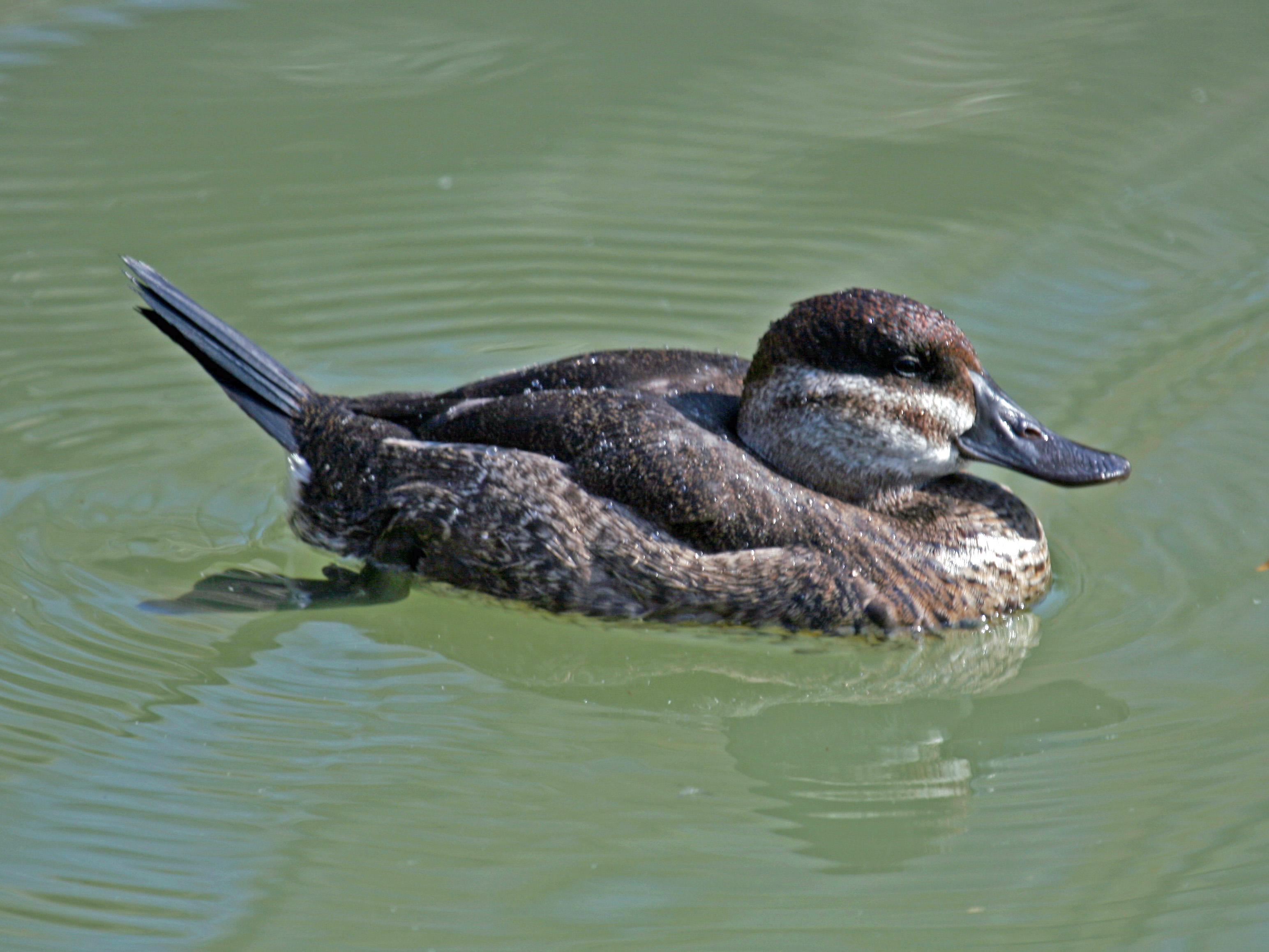
- Female

Conservation status
- Least Concern (IUCN 3.1)

Scientific classification
- Kingdom: Animalia
- Phylum: Chordata
- Class: Aves
- Order: Anseriformes
- Family: Anatidae
- Genus: Oxyura
- Species: O. jamaicensis

Binomial name
- Oxyura jamaicensis (Gmelin, 1789)
- Extant, breeding Extant, resident Extant, passage Extant, non-breeding Extant & Introduced (resident) Probably extinct

Synonyms
- Erismatura jamaicensis

= Ruddy duck =

Ruddy duck Temporal range: Chibanian–Present (Note: Fossil remains are known from between 0.30 and 0.01 million years ago.)

Species of bird

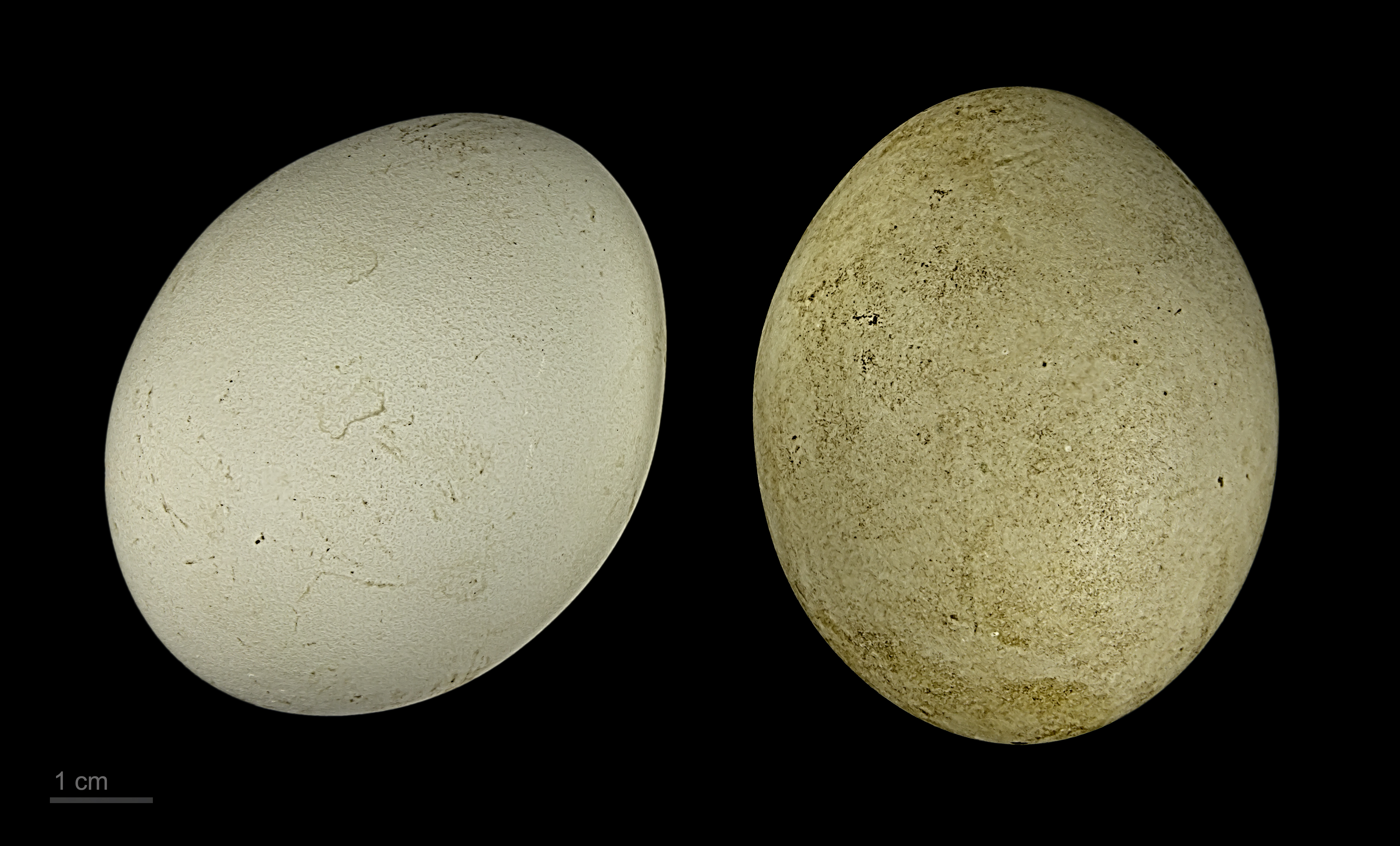
Oxyura jamaicensis - MHNT

The ruddy duck (Oxyura jamaicensis) is a species of duck, one of six extant species of stiff-tailed duck (genus Oxyura). In the 1940s, the ruddy duck was introduced to the United Kingdom, where it established a population. Outside the Americas, the ruddy duck is considered a highly invasive species, prompting many countries to initiate culling projects to eradicate it from the native ecosystem.

The generic name is derived from Ancient Greek oxus meaning "sharp", and oura meaning "tail". The specific name jamaicensis means "from Jamaica". The ruddy duck has also been nicknamed "butterball", a term used to describe an individual that is somewhat fat, due to its short and stout stature making activities like flying and walking upright awkward.

== Taxonomy ==
The ruddy duck was formally described in 1789 by the German naturalist Johann Friedrich Gmelin in his revised and expanded edition of Carl Linnaeus's Systema Naturae. He placed it with the other ducks, geese and swans in the genus Anas and coined the binomial name Anas jamaicensis. Gmelin based his description on the "Jamaica shoveler" that had been described in 1785 by the English ornithologist John Latham from a specimen that he had received from Jamaica. The ruddy duck is now placed with five other species in the genus Oxyura that was introduced in 1828 by the French naturalist Charles Lucien Bonaparte. The genus name is derived from Ancient Greek oxus, meaning "sharp", and oura meaning "tail". The specific epithet jamaicensis means "from Jamaica". The Andean duck was formerly considered to be conspecific with the ruddy duck but with the two species split, the ruddy duck is monotypic: no subspecies are recognised.

== Description ==
Ruddy duck diving under water

The ruddy duck is a small, compact duck with a stout, scoop-shaped bill, and a long, stiff tail which it holds cocked upward. It has a slightly peaked head and a fairly short, thick neck. The male ruddy duck has a blackish cap that contrasts with its bright white cheeks. In summer, it has a rich chestnut body with a bright blue bill. In winter, it is a dull gray-brown above and paler below with a dull gray bill. The female and first-year male are brownish, somewhat like the winter male but with a blurry stripe across the pale cheek patch. In flight, the ruddy duck shows the solidly dark tops of the wings. On average, the female is smaller and weighs less than the male.

It has a short and stout scoop-shaped bill designed for underwater foraging. With its short stature, it is known to be a great swimmer whilst finding taking flight a much more laboured task. In comparison to other ducks, ruddy ducks rarely fly but when they do, it is done with a very fast wingbeat and closely over the water.

An interesting physical feature found within this taxon of duck is the trachea, inflatable air sacs, and esophagi which are used in displays. The tail of the ruddy duck is commonly seen held upwards.

Standard Measurements
Total Body Length	340–430 mm (13.5–17 in)
Weight	560 g (1.23 lb)
Wingspan	470 mm (18.5 in)
Wing	133–147.5 mm (5.24–5.81 in)
Tail	67–79 mm (2.6–3.1 in)
Culmen	38.5–41 mm (1.52–1.61 in)
Tarsus	33–38 mm (1.3–1.5 in)

== Vocalizations ==
Both male and female ruddy ducks are not known to be very vocal most of the year, though they do become more vocal when courting and raising young. Males are known to produce short "aa-anh" calls and other noises in short bursts. Female ruddy ducks have a much higher pitched call, often having a "raanh" sound when communicating with their brood, squeaks when chased by males, and hisses and nasal sounds towards intruders.

== Behaviour and ecology ==
=== Breeding and habits ===
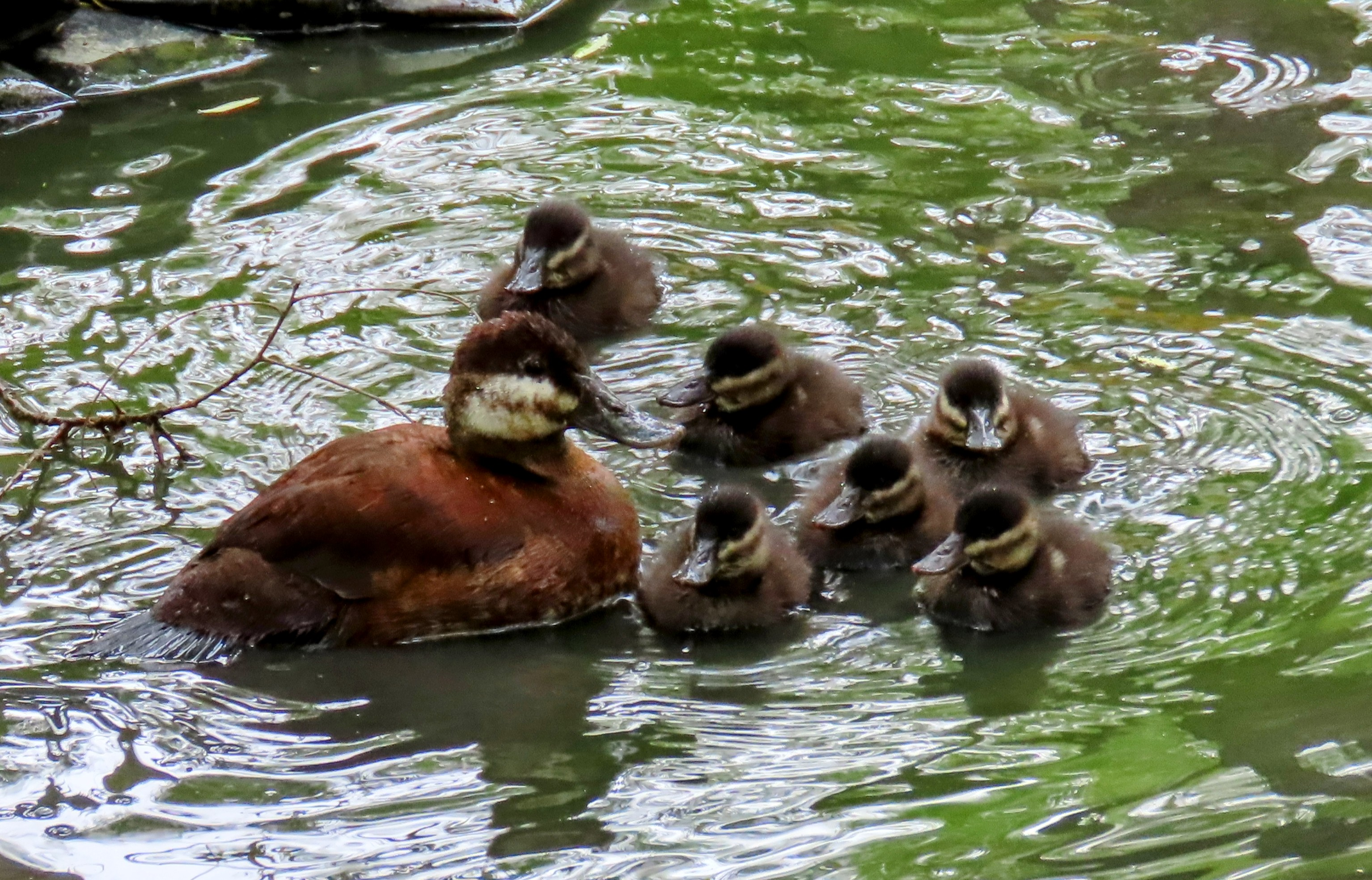
A female ruddy duck with six ducklings

Unlike other migratory anatine courtship where partnerships occur in wintering grounds, ruddy ducks often begin courtship on the breeding ground. Both male and female ruddy ducks have been observed interacting aggressively with each other but despite aggression, pairs can be seen loafing next to each other minutes later. Their breeding habitat is marshy lakes and ponds.

Both male and females are not known to be very vocal with quacks, though males are known to produce a distinct drumming sound by beating their lower mandible on their breast. This drumming beat is done hard enough that often swirls of bubbles will appear in the water. This display is known as "bubbling". In an aggressive response, the male faces his rival while performing bubbling. In courting, a bubbling male orientates his body laterally to the female. In a group of courting birds of more than one male, the males typically display rapidly alternating forms of bubbling in accordance with constantly and suddenly changing aggressive and sexual responses. In courting gestures females mostly respond to the male's advances.

They nest in dense marsh vegetation near water. The female builds the nest out of grass, locating it in tall vegetation to hide it from predators. A typical brood contains 5 to 15 ducklings. Pairs form each year. Though ruddy ducks can have large broods, the male normally takes no part in rearing. Eggs measure 5.9–6.8 cm (2.3–2.7 in) in length and 4.3–4.8 cm (1.7–1.9 in) in width. The female will incubate the eggs for 23–26 days whilst being protected by her mate. After the young hatch, it only takes about a month or two until they are fully ready to fly but as a result of the young being independent very quickly, they often stray from the rest of the brood. Females will care for her young but never for the entire period of the fledgling.

Female ruddy ducks have been observed acting in brood parasitism. There hasn't been a clear factor that influences females to lay their eggs in other nests. Though it was observed that parasitic eggs were more likely to be male than female hatchlings. Though some suspect that the parasitic laying is directly tied to the lack of attunement between the female ruddy duck and the environmental cues.

They are migratory and winter in coastal bays and unfrozen lakes and ponds.

=== Feeding ===
Ruddy ducks mainly feed on a large amount of plant matter like seeds and roots as well as aquatic insects and crustaceans. A large portion of the animal matter consumed is larvae and pupae. During the winter, they often consume a higher amount of animal food. The food foraged is done underwater, an activity that the ruddy duck excels at. They forage by straining food from the surface of the substrate, moving their bills side to side whilst opening and closing their mandibles. This allows their food to stay caught in between their bill whilst the substrate is filtered out.

Due to all foraging occurring with substrate clouding the water, the way ruddy ducks select their prey is not through visuals. Instead, ruddy ducks use tactile location of the larvae and pupae to forage. Ruddy ducks can also feed on small molluscs and crustaceans like bivalves and amphipods. They are able to find these organisms in moving waters by using the tip of their bill as it has many sensory endings which direct the duck towards their food. The slight crooked shape of their mandible also allows them to efficiently tear at plant matter underwater.

When searching for randomly placed food patches, Ruddy Ducks sampled previously profitable sites before investigating other areas more frequently than would be expected by chance. Revisiting previously profitable foraging sites may be important when exploiting a patchy food resource with prey densities that are likely to be quickly replenished after having been exploited.

== Invasive species and culling ==
As a result of escapes from wildfowl collections in the late 1950s, ruddy ducks became established in Great Britain, from where they spread into Europe. This duck's aggressive courting behavior and willingness to interbreed with the endangered native white-headed duck (Oxyura leucocephala), of southern Europe, caused concern amongst Spanish conservationists. Due to this, a controversial scheme to extirpate the ruddy duck as a British breeding species started; there have also been culling attempts in other European countries.

By March 2012 a culling program in the UK, supported by the RSPB, had killed 6,500, at a cost of £5m (£769 per bird). In 2003 the BBC had reported the cost of killing each bird at £915. In 2012 Lee Evans, founder of the British Birding Association, claimed "The cull cannot succeed now. There are hundreds of ruddy ducks on the continent which will not be killed so the birds will continue to breed. There's never been any proof, anyway, that the British population has ever interbred with the Spanish ducks". By early 2014, the cull had reduced the British population to about 20–100, down from a peak of about 5,500 in 2000. According to Animal Aid, in the UK the cost of hunting down the last few ruddy ducks was £3,000 per bird. They advised "If you see one, don't tell anyone. Even bird groups will tell the authorities and those birds may be killed".

In Europe, the ruddy duck is included since 2016 in the list of Invasive Alien Species of Union concern (the Union list). That implies the species cannot be imported, bred, transported, commercialized, or intentionally released into the environment in the whole of the European Union.
