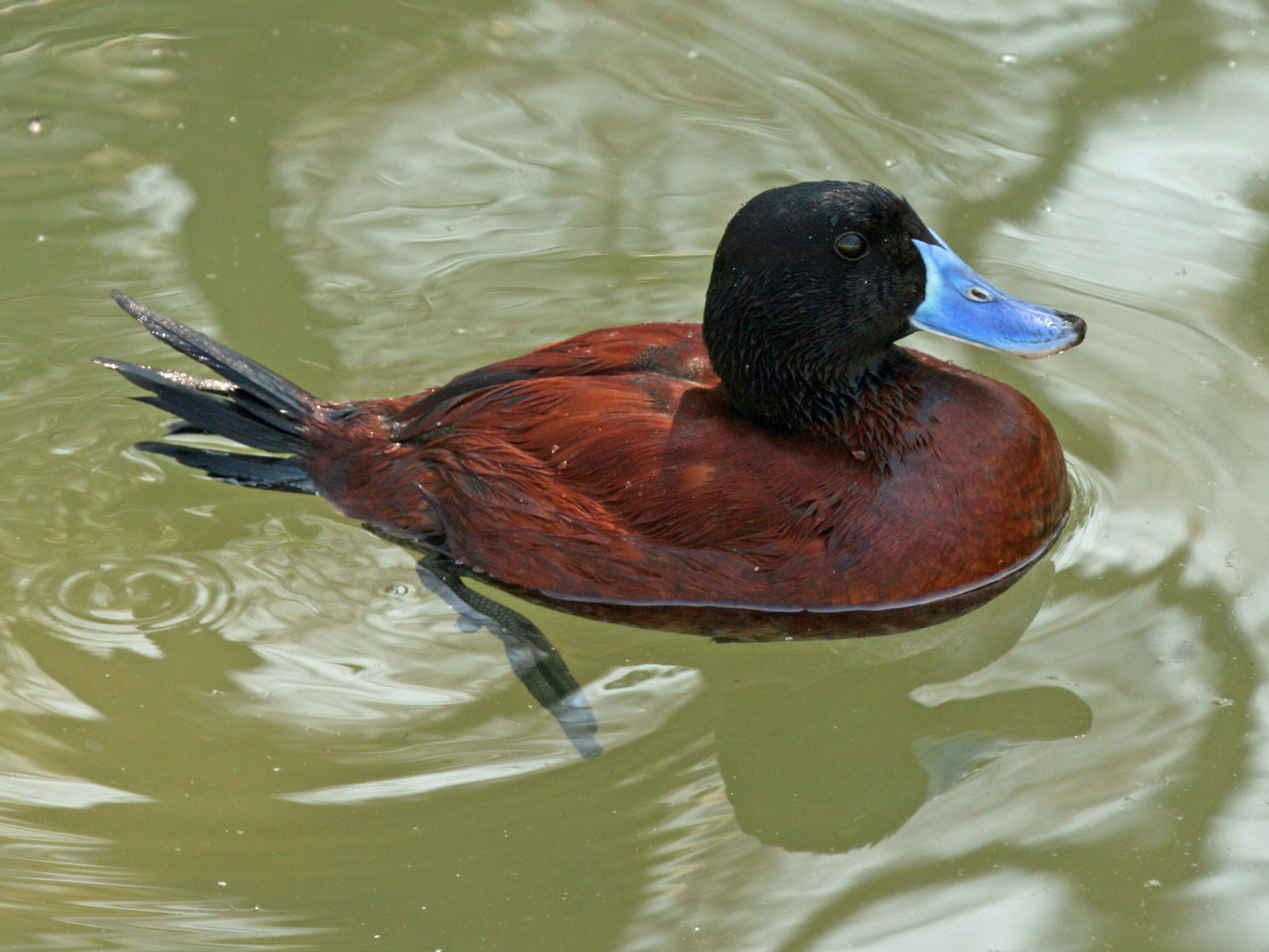

Conservation status
- Least Concern (IUCN 3.1)

Scientific classification
- Kingdom: Animalia
- Phylum: Chordata
- Class: Aves
- Order: Anseriformes
- Family: Anatidae
- Genus: Oxyura
- Species: O. vittata

Binomial name
- Oxyura vittata (Philippi, 1860)
- Oxyura vittata range

Synonyms
- Erismatura vittata Philippi, 1860

= Lake duck =

Species of bird

The lake duck (Oxyura vittata) is a small, South American stiff-tailed duck. It is also called the Argentine blue-bill, Argentine blue-billed duck, Argentine lake duck, or Argentine ruddy duck.

== Description ==
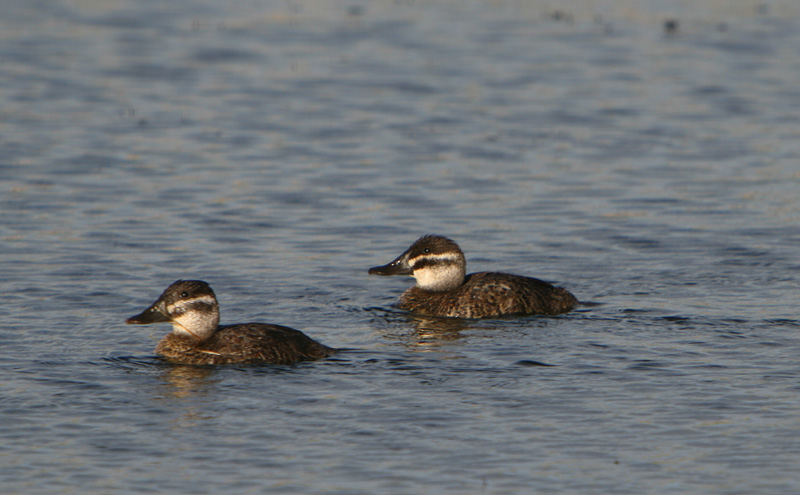
Females

The lake duck grows to 36–46 centimetres (14–18 in). Females weigh 510–700 grams (18–25 oz) and males 600–850 grams (21–30 oz). Males can be distinguished from Andean duck (Oxyura ferruginea), a similar species, by being smaller and having a flatter head.

Female ducks have a corkscrew vagina.

=== Penis ===
The lake duck holds the Guinness World Record for having the largest avian reproductive organ, from a specimen in Córdoba, Argentina that had a penis measuring 42.5 centimetres (16.7 in). It also has the longest penis of any vertebrate in relation to body length. The penis, which is typically coiled up in flaccid state, can reach about the same length as the animal itself when fully erect, but more commonly is about half the bird's length. It has a soft tip and spiny base. It is theorized that the size of their spiny penises with bristled tips may have evolved in response to competitive pressure in these highly promiscuous birds, removing sperm from previous matings in the manner of a bottle brush.

Although most male birds have no penis, ducks have a long corkscrew penis, and the females have a long corkscrew vagina, which spirals in the opposite direction. The males often try to force copulation, but the complex mating geometry allows the females to retain control—most forced copulations do not result in successful fertilization.

== Behavior ==
Little is known about the lake duck's diet, but it is believed to consist of small invertebrates, seeds, and plant remains. The breeding season varies between countries, occurring from October to January in Argentina. Males produce popping noises and "mechanical rustling noises" for display.

== Distribution ==
The lake duck is a partially migratory species. It lives in bodies of freshwater with large amounts of vegetation, such as wetlands and lakes. It is very widespread, naturally occurring in Argentina, Brazil, Chile, Paraguay, and Uruguay, and having been introduced to the Falkland Islands. It has a stable population of 6,700–67,000, with no major threats. As of 2016, it is listed as a species of least concern on the IUCN Red List.
