= Andean duck =

- Male Andean duck in breeding plumage

Conservation status
- Least Concern (IUCN 3.1)

Scientific classification
- Kingdom: Animalia
- Phylum: Chordata
- Class: Aves
- Order: Anseriformes
- Family: Anatidae
- Genus: Oxyura
- Species: O. ferruginea

Binomial name
- Oxyura ferruginea (Eyton, 1838)
- Range of Oxyura ferruginea.

Synonyms
- Oxyura jamaicensis ferruginea; Erismatura ferruginea

Species of bird

The Andean duck (Oxyura ferruginea), also known as the Peruvian ruddy duck, is a species of duck in the stiff-tailed duck genus, Oxyura, native to the Andean Mountains of South America. It has been considered a subspecies of the North American ruddy duck (Oxyura jamaicensis), and taxonomic authorities such as the American Ornithological Society still consider it conspecific with the ruddy duck.

== Taxonomy ==
The Andean duck was initially described as Erismatura ferruginea by English naturalist Thomas Campbell Eyton in 1838, based on a holotype specimen collected in Chile. The specific epithet, ferruginea, is derived from the Latin ferrugineus, meaning rusty-colored or ferruginous.

The taxonomic status of the Andean duck, and its placement amongst the other species of genus Oxyura, has remained a subject of considerable debate. Since the 1960s, it has been treated by several taxonomies as a subspecies of the North American ruddy duck (Oxyura jamaicensis), O. j. ferruginea. A Mitochondrial DNA analysis in 2005 recovered a notable lack of shared haplotypes between the Andean duck and ruddy duck, which suggests a strong degree of historical isolation between the two popuations.

In 1998, the American Ornithological Society separated the Andean duck from the ruddy duck as a full species based on morphological and behavioral studies. When the AOS's South American Checklist Committee established their baseline taxonomy, A Classification of the Bird Species of South America, in 2005, the Andean duck was treated as conspecific with the ruddy duck based on phylogenetic studies using mitochondrial DNA and on the presence of hybrid populations (O. j. andina) in Colombia.

It was also noted by the SACC that the AOS's 1998 taxonomy was based on two studies which considered the Andean duck to be more closely related to the lake duck (O. vittata) than the ruddy duck. However, subsequent studies using genetic material found that O. ferruginea and O. jamaicensis are each other's closest relatives, and did not always completely sort into monophyletic groupings. In 2021, the AOS redesignated the Andean duck as conspecific with the ruddy duck based on molecular phylogenetic studies which found that jamaicensis, ferruginea, and andina form a tight clade together.

Presently, the American Birding Association's Clements checklist treats it as a species, with two subspecies:

- O. f. ferruginea, the nominate subspecies, which ranges from the Andes of southern Colombia to southern Chile, including as far south as Tierra del Fuego, and has an all-black head.
- O. f. andina, or the Colombian ruddy duck, which is endemic to middle and high elevation wetlands (2,000–4,000 metres (6,600–13,100 ft)) of the Colombian Andes, and shows variable cheek coloration ranging from all-black, as with O. f. ferruginea, to completely white, as with the ruddy duck.
  Male O. f. ferruginea, showing all-black head
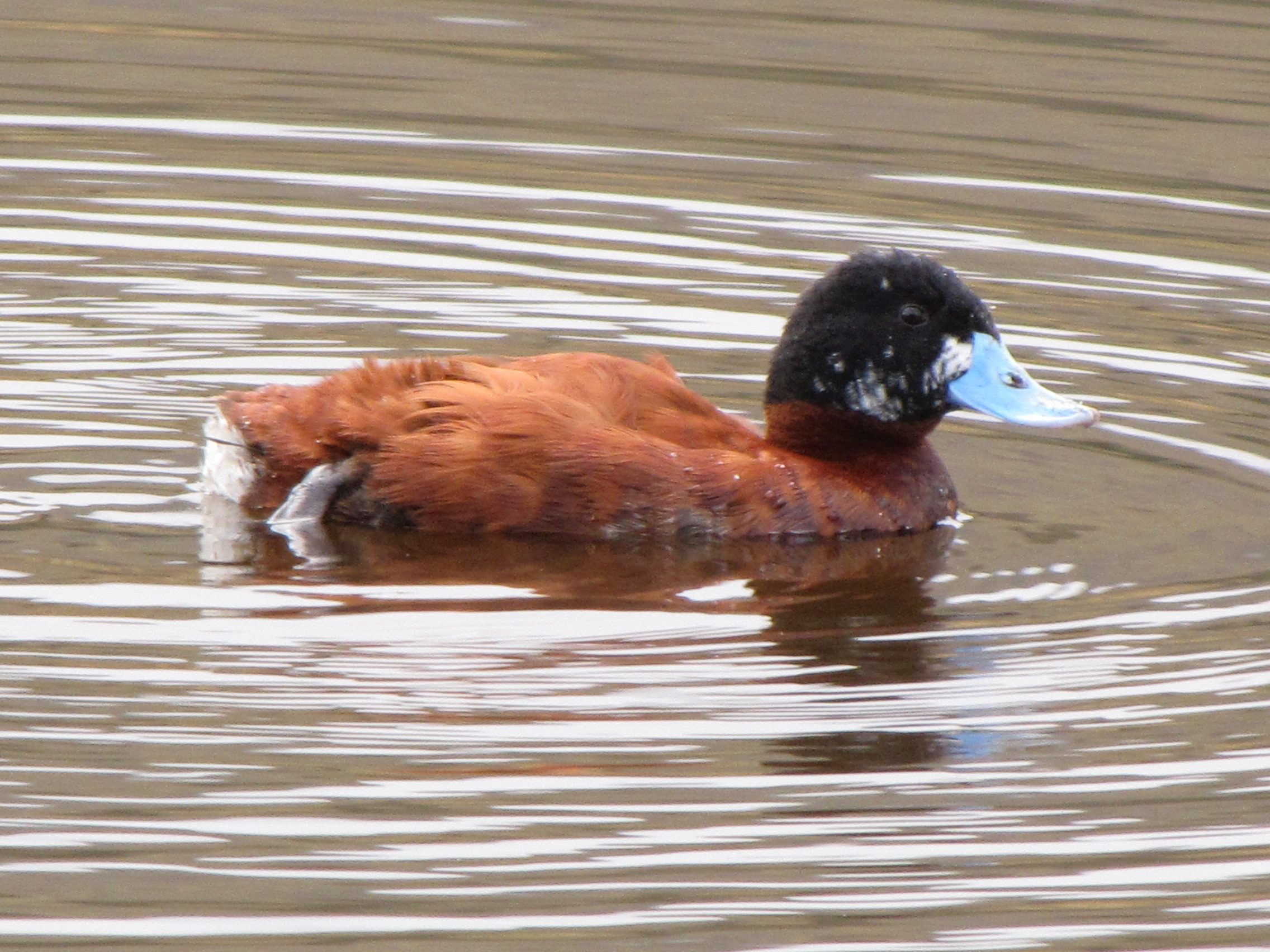
  Male O. f. andina, showing slight white spotting on cheek
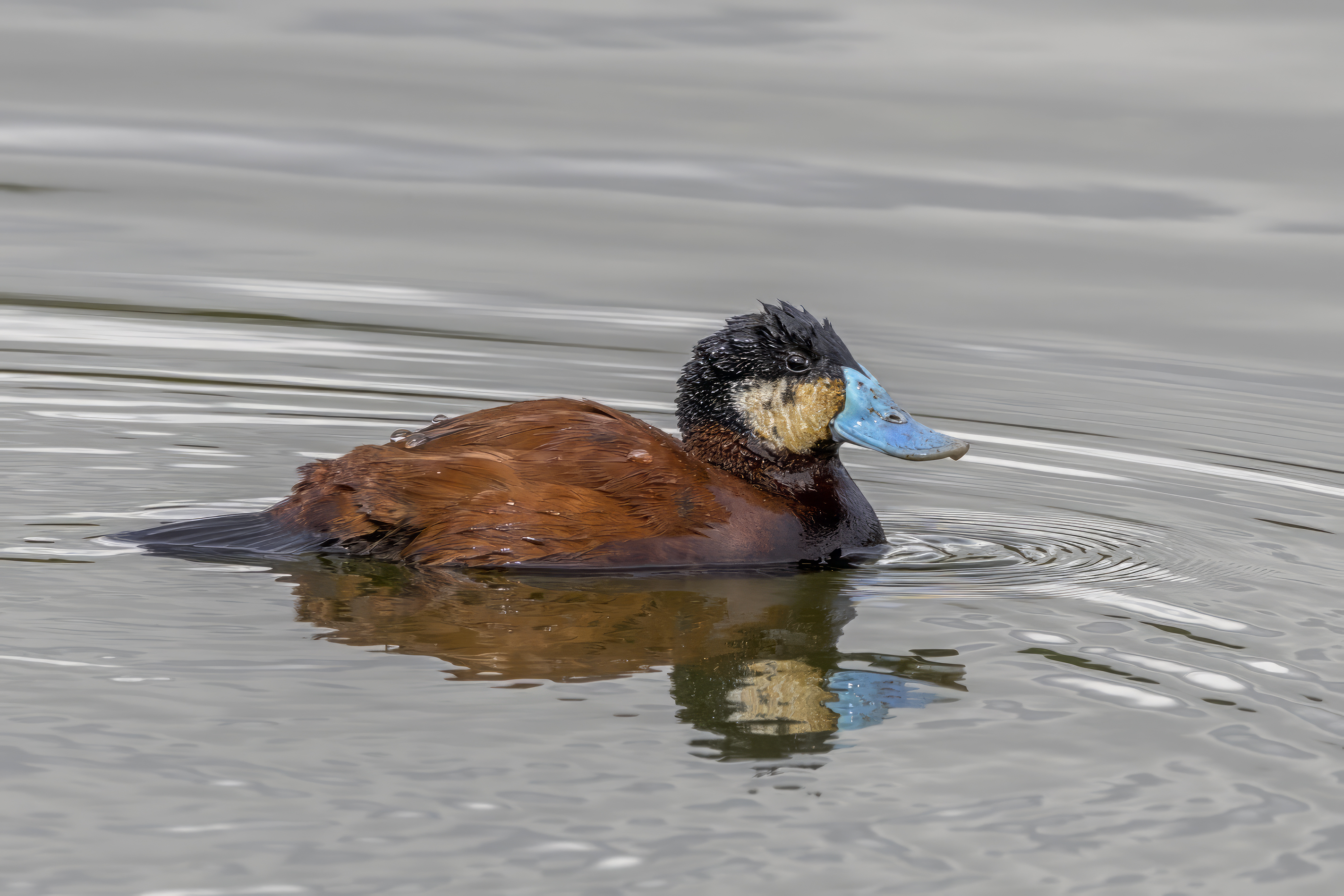
  Male O. f. andina, showing significant white patch on cheek

== Description ==
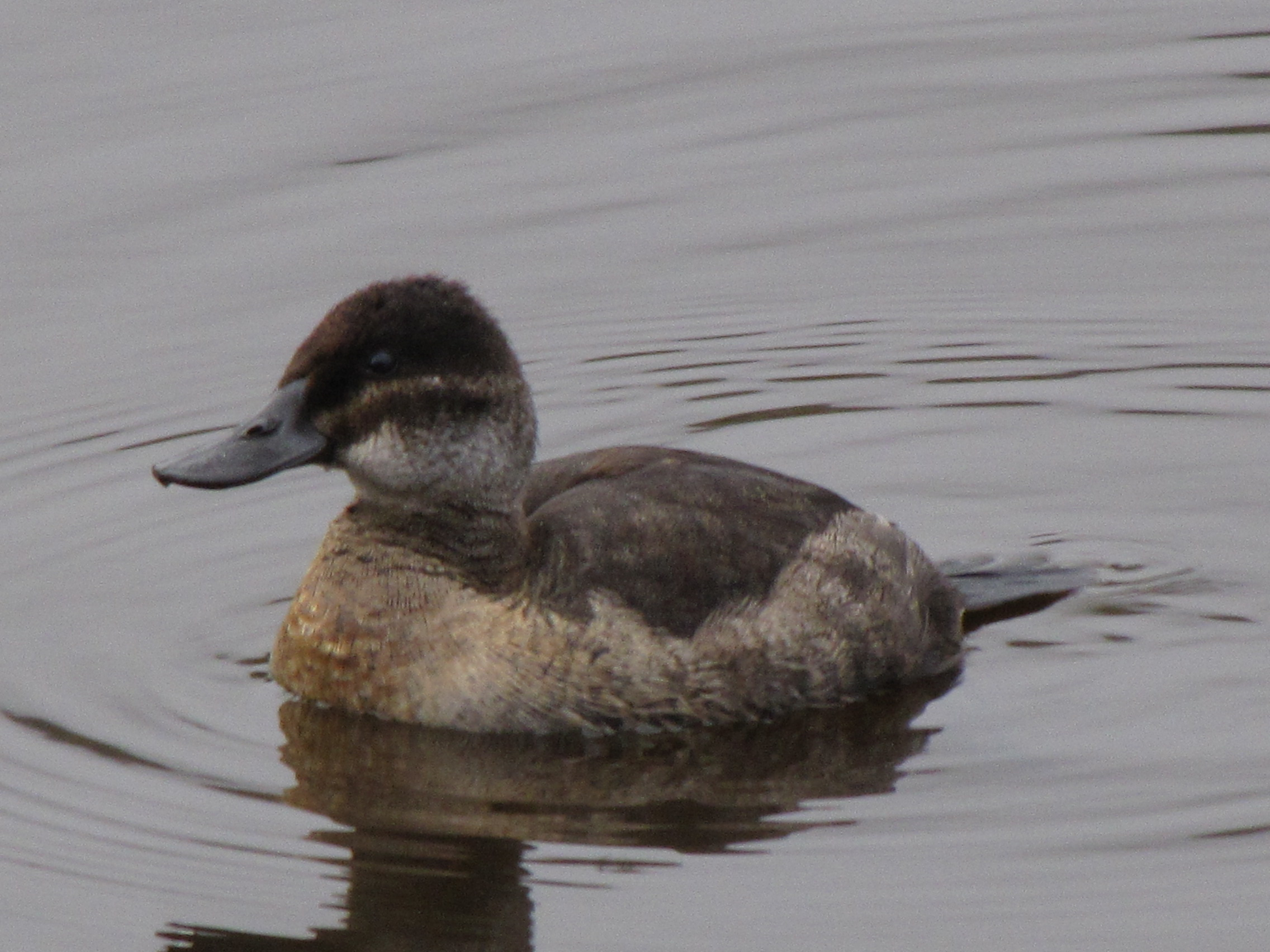
Female Andean duck

These ducks are small and compactly built, reaching 45–58 cm (18–23 in) in length and 817-848g in weight. They have slightly peaked heads with stout, scoop-shaped bills, and fairly short, thick necks. Like other members of genus Oxyura, they also have long, stiff tails that they often hold cocked upward. The undertail plumage is dark brown. In breeding plumage, males have rich chestnut bodies and dusky, dark brown and silvery-gray white mottled bellies, with glossy black heads, occasional whitish patches on the chin, and bright blue bills.

In winter plumage, males are dark gray-brown to blackish-brown above, with whitish vermiculation and reddish-brown mottled breasts, fading into a lighter, silvery or whitish belly. Their bills are a dull gray. Males are in winter plumage for about five months out of the year. Female plumage resembles winter males, but with a blurry stripe across the pale cheek patch. First-year males and juveniles resemble females, with pale, lead-gray bills and pale patches on the face.

Compared to the ruddy duck, male Andean ducks in breeding plumage are distinguishable by an all-black head with no white cheek patch, a stouter bill, a darker overall coloration, dark brown undertail instead of white, and larger body size. Females are also darker in coloration than female ruddy ducks, with a more indistinct facial pattern.

Andean ducks are generally quiet. They make mechanical drumming or bubbling sounds in courtship display, and males may also give a sharp, nasally aarp call.

== Breeding and habits ==
Andean ducks can be found in high- and mid- elevation wetland habitat of the Andes, from southern Colombia through Tierra del Fuego. In the northern Andes, these ducks are most often observed at 2,500–4,500 metres (8,200–14,800 ft). In the southern Andes, they typically inhabit lower elevations, often below 2,500 metres (8,200 ft) and as low as 875 metres (2,871 ft) in eastern Bolivia. There are also lower-elevation populations on Peru's west coast.

Male Andean duck in habitat

Some populations undertake regular seasonal, short-distance movements, and will expand into more lowland habitats or further south, including neighboring foothills and plains from Rio Negro to Tierra del Fuego, during the breeding season. Populations of Andean ducks breeding in the most southerly extent of their range winter further north. Infrequent long-distance dispersals may also occur in response to environmental pressures, such as changing water conditions. Otherwise, Andean ducks are sedentary, being residents of Andean lakes from southern Columbia through Chile. They can be found in pairs or in small, loose flocks.

Outside of the breeding season, Andean ducks are found in large lakes, freshwater swamps and marshes, lakes, and pools with emergent vegetation (often Salvinaceae and Araceae) and open water. In Peru, they are also found in deep coastal brackish lagoons and estuaries. They prefer still, calm waters, avoiding all but the slowest-moving of flowing water.

These birds are almost exclusively aquatic. In response to danger, females and juveniles remain still and then dive, leaving only their heads and some of the neck above the surface. Males attempt to escape by swimming or diving, fully submerging and reappearing within 20–30 metres (66–98 ft), often resurfacing beneath the leaves of floating plants.

Male and female Andean duck on the water

As with other members of genus Oxyura, Andean ducks are specialist divers, being well adapted to dive and swim underwater. They mainly eat seeds and roots of aquatic plants and aquatic invertebrates, including molluscs, aquatic insects & their larvae, and crustaceans. They likely feed similarly to ruddy ducks, by sieving and straining prey items from the muddy sediment and debris lying at the bottoms of ponds, swamps, shallow lakes, sheltered lagoons, and bays while diving.

Their foraging patterns likely vary seasonally. In a study on birds on Lake Junin, the stomach contents of birds examined in June consisted exclusively of annelids (specifically Helobdella triserialis), and birds had more than 2mm of subcutaneous fat. By November, stomach contents consisted of plants, molluscs (Pisidium), crustaceans (Hyallella), and various insect species (Hemiptera, Diptera, Coleoptera, and Ephemeroptera).

Breeding habitat for Andean ducks consists of marshy lakes and ponds from central Chile and Argentina south to northern Tierra del Fuego. Stands of new-grown emergent vegetation, mainly rushes and sedges, are an essential component of suitable breeding habitat.

Juvenile Andean ducks

The breeding season lasts most of the year in Colombia and coastal Peru, with eggs being recorded in late spring through early summer in Argentina (November through December), spring through late summer in coastal Peru (October through February), and late summer in Bolivia and Ecuador (March and April, respectively). Andean ducks have been found to congregate at specific breeding sites across their range, preferring lake edges with sufficient vegetation and avoiding large areas of open water.

They are seasonally monogamous, forming pair-bonds for the duration of the breeding season and nesting in single pairs. The pair selects a nesting site together, although the female builds the nest alone. The bowl-shaped nests are in dense marsh vegetation near or over water, being constructed out of grass and other, usually dead, vegetation and sometimes lined with down.

Females lay between 6 to 10, sometimes up to 17, white eggs, and incubate them for 24 to 26 days alone. Upon hatching, chicks sport dark to olive gray down with paler, yellower bellies and sides of the head. A typical brood contains 5 to 15 ducklings, which likely fledge in 50 to 55 days, as with the ruddy duck. Andean ducks likely attain sexual maturity at two years.

== Status and conservation ==
The Andean duck is classified as Least Concern by the IUCN due to its large range. It is considered Endangered in Colombia. It is generally uncommon to locally common in its range, with an estimated overall population of between 25,000 and 110,000 individuals. Their overall population is likely decreasing. Andean ducks can be found in significant numbers in some regions with suitable habitat; it is one of the more common nesting birds at Uru Uru Lake in Bolivia, and an estimated 2,000 to 3,000 birds were recorded between 1977 and 1979 at Junín in west-central Peru. Major threats include habitat loss, hunting, and habitat degradation from pollution.

The population of subspecies andina is estimated to be 10,000 birds, which is likely declining. It is scarce and local within its restricted range and subject to the same threats of hunting, habitat loss, and habitat degradation as the nominate ferruginea.
