= Smith Lake =

Smith Lake may refer to:

== Antarctica ==
- Smith Lake (Antarctica)

== Australia ==
- Smith Lake, a lake and village in the Mid North Coast, New South Wales, Australia
- Smiths Lake, New South Wales, often mistakenly called Smith Lake

== United States ==
- Lewis Smith Lake, a lake in North-Central Alabama
- Smith Lake (University of Alaska Fairbanks), a lake in Fairbanks North Star Borough, Alaska
- Smith Lake in Cross County, Arkansas
- Smith Lake in Desha County, Arkansas
- Smith Lake in Hempstead County, Arkansas
- Smith Lake in Miller County, Arkansas
- Smith Lake in White County, Arkansas
- Smith Lake in Boundary County, Idaho
- Smith Lake (Berrien County, Michigan)
- Smith Lake, a lake in Carver County, Minnesota
- Smith Lake (Murray County, Minnesota)
- Smith Lake (Wright County, Minnesota)
- Smith and Bybee Wetlands Natural Area, comprising Smith and Bybee lakes, part of the Columbia Slough system in North Portland
- Smith Lake, a reservoir in Stafford County, Virginia
- Smith Lake (Thurston County, Washington)
