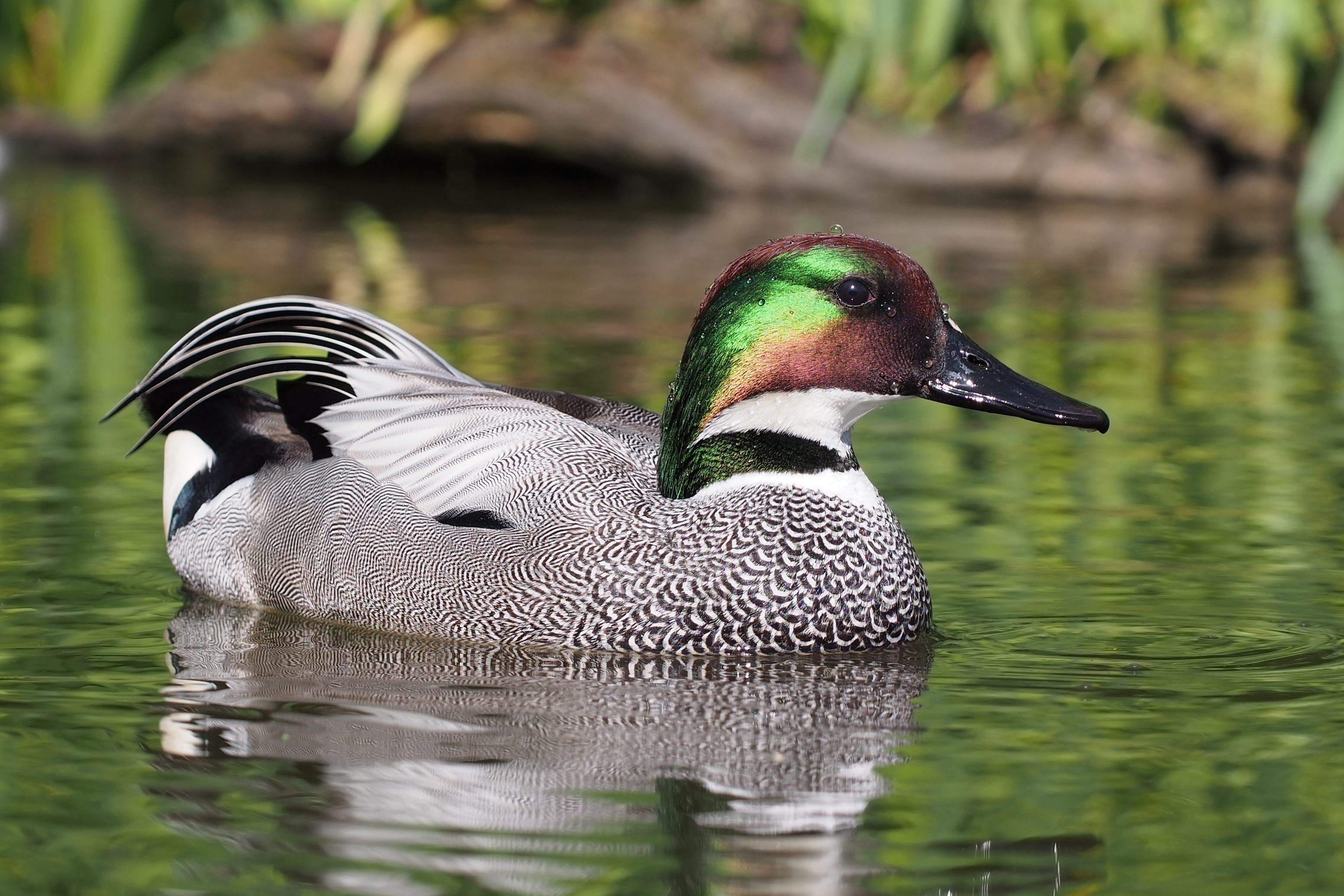

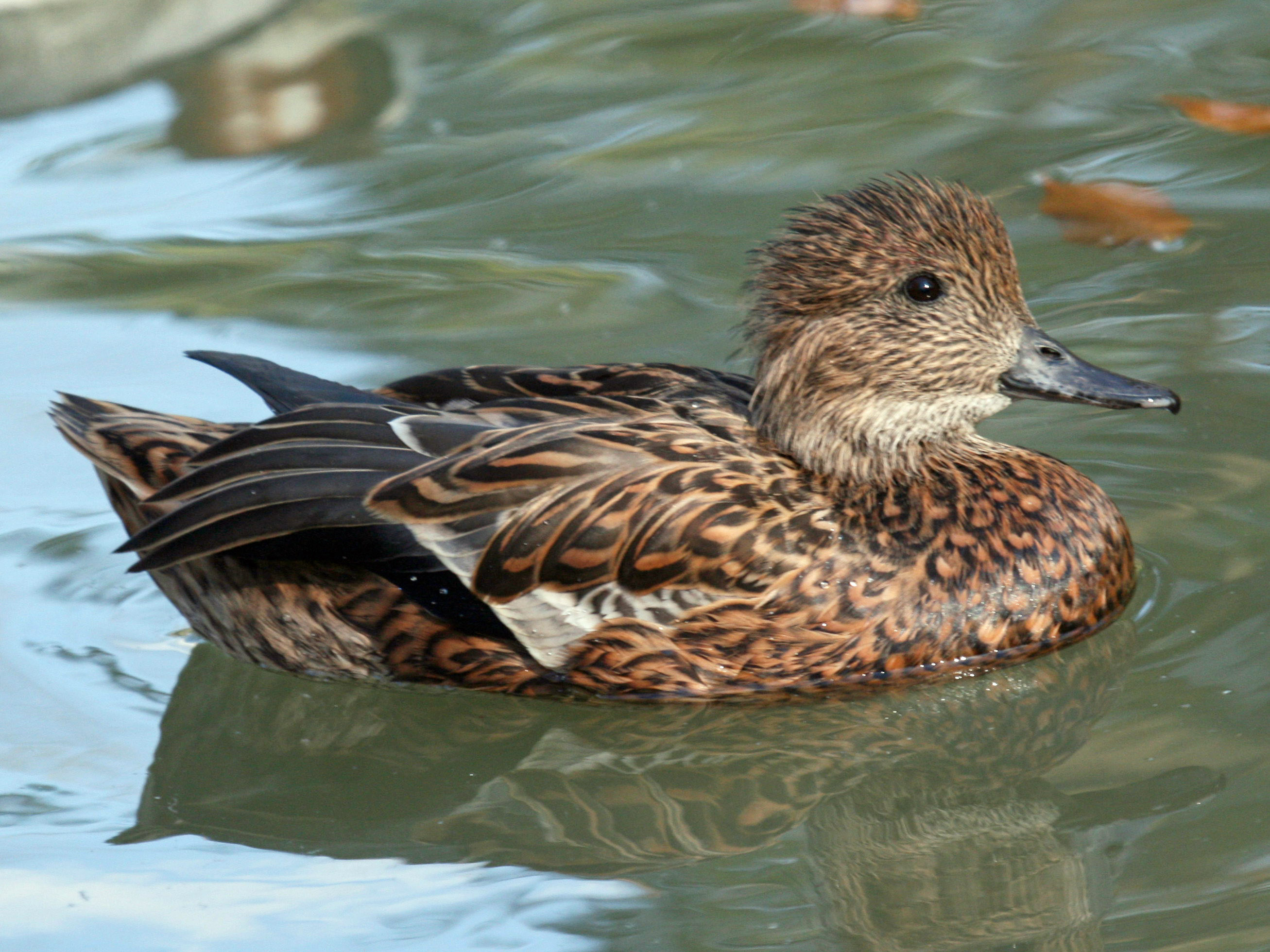
- Male above, female below

Conservation status
- Least Concern (IUCN 3.1)

Scientific classification
- Kingdom: Animalia
- Phylum: Chordata
- Class: Aves
- Order: Anseriformes
- Family: Anatidae
- Genus: Mareca
- Species: M. falcata

Binomial name
- Mareca falcata (Georgi, 1775)

Synonyms
- Anas falcata Georgi, 1775

= Falcated duck =

Species of bird

The falcated duck or falcated teal (Mareca falcata) is a gadwall-sized dabbling duck from the east Palearctic (East Siberia and Mongolia to North Japan; wintering to India).

== Taxonomy ==
The closest relative of this species is the gadwall, followed by the wigeons. The species was assigned to the proposed genus Mareca after its previous placement in the genus Anas was found to be paraphyletic in 2009.

There are many species that have mitochondrial DNA lineages that are phylogenetically intermixed with other species, but studies have rarely tested the cause of such paraphyly. In a study that was conducted, there were tested two hypotheses that could explain mitochondrial paraphyly of Holarctic gadwalls (Mareca strepera) with respect to Asian falcated ducks (M. falcata). First, hybridization could have resulted in falcated duck mitochondrial DNA (mtDNA) introgressing into the gadwall gene pool. Second, gadwalls and falcated ducks could have diverged so recently that mtDNA lineages have not sorted to reciprocal monophyly. They used coalescent analyses of three independent loci to distinguish between these two hypotheses. Two lines of evidence support introgression. First, analyses of the three loci combined show that some introgression is necessary to explain current genetic diversity in gadwalls. Second, they generated alternative predictions regarding time since divergence estimated from mtDNA: falcated ducks and gadwalls would have diverged between 65,000 and 700,000 years before present (ybp) under the introgression hypothesis and between 11,000 and 76,000 ybp under the incomplete lineage sorting hypothesis. The two independent nuclear introns indicated that these species diverged between 210,000 and 5,200,000 ybp, which did not overlap the predicted time for incomplete lineage sorting. These analyses also suggested that ancient introgression (similar to 14,000 ybp) has resulted in the widespread distribution and high frequency of falcated-like mtDNA (5.5% of haplotypes) in North America. This is the first study to use a rigorous quantitative framework to reject incomplete lineage sorting as the cause of mitochondrial paraphyly.

== Distribution and habitat ==
The falcated duck breeds in eastern Asia. It nests in eastern Russia, in Khabarovsk, Primorskiy, Amur, Chita, Buryatia, Irkutsk, Tuva, eastern Krasnoyarsk, south central Sakha, Sakhalin, extreme northeastern North Korea and northern China, in northeastern Inner Mongolia, and northern Heilongjiang, and in northern Japan, Hokkaidō, Aomori, and the Kuril Islands. It is widely recorded well outside its normal range, but the popularity of this beautiful duck in captivity clouds the origins of these extralimital birds.

This dabbling duck is strongly migratory and winters in much of Southeast Asia. In India: Uttar Pradesh, Bihār, Assam, eastern Haryāna. Also in northern Bangladesh, northern and central Myanmar, northern Laos to the Mekong River, northern Vietnam (from about Hanoi north), and China: Hainan, Taiwan, Yunnan, Guangxi, Guangdong, Fujian, Jiangxi, northern Hunan, Hubei, Zhejiang, Anhui, Jiangsu, Shandong, southern Hebei, Shanxi, northern Shaanxi. It is gregarious outside the breeding season and will then form large flocks.

It is estimated that there are about 89,000 falcated ducks in total; this is much higher than the previous population estimate of 35,000 worldwide.

During a survey done in Central China, a migratory area in the winter for the falcated duck, the numbers of animals sighted was minimal. In 2004 only 4 were recorded, and in 2005 only 10.

This is a species of lowland wetlands, such as water meadows or lakes, and usually feeds by dabbling for plant food or grazing.

The National Nature Reserves supported high proportions of eastern China's populations of globally threatened Anatidae species (IUCN, 2009): 30% of the near threatened falcated duck (Anas falcata) populations. There is about twenty-seven percent of falcated duck species existing in the National Nature Reserves.

=== Migration ===
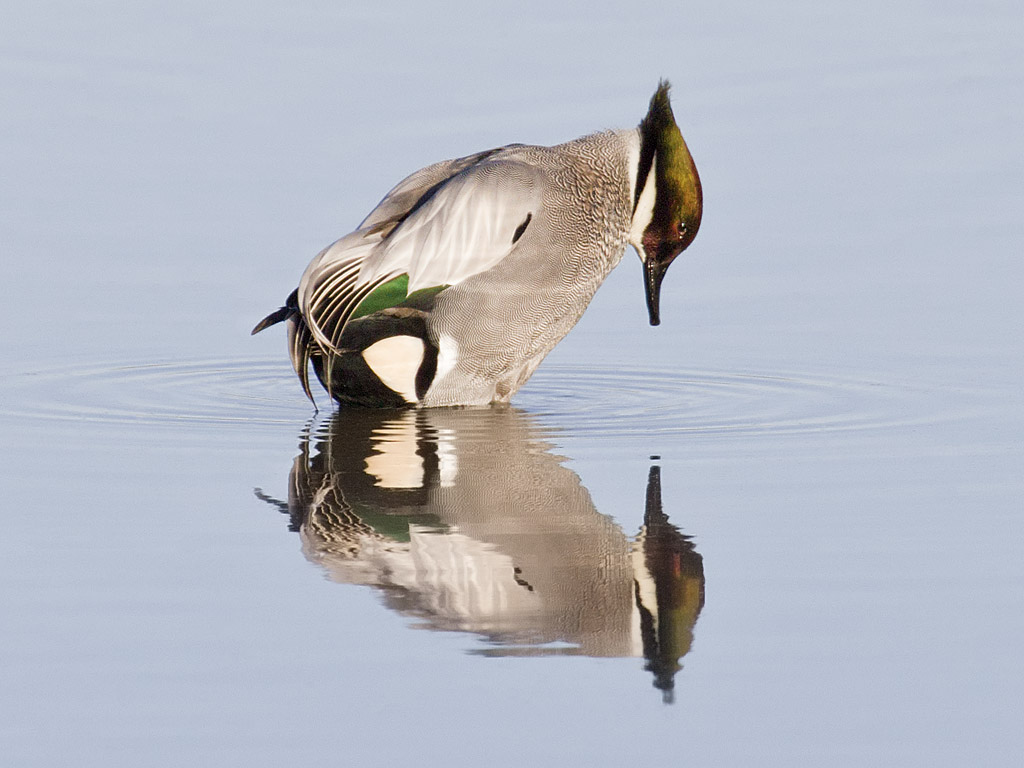
A falcated duck, a rare vagrant from Asia, that arrived at California's Colusa National Wildlife Refuge in December 2011

The falcated duck has a large range, with an estimated global extent of occurrence of 1,000,000–10,000,000 km^{2} (390,000–3,860,000 sq mi).

The breeding range of the falcated duck is from eastern Siberia and Mongolia to northeastern China and northern Japan with wintering grounds in the northern part of southeast Asia to northeastern India. There have also been a small number of sightings of falcated ducks in western North America and Poland. However, these sightings have been attributed to vagrants and ducks that have escaped from captivity.

== Identification ==
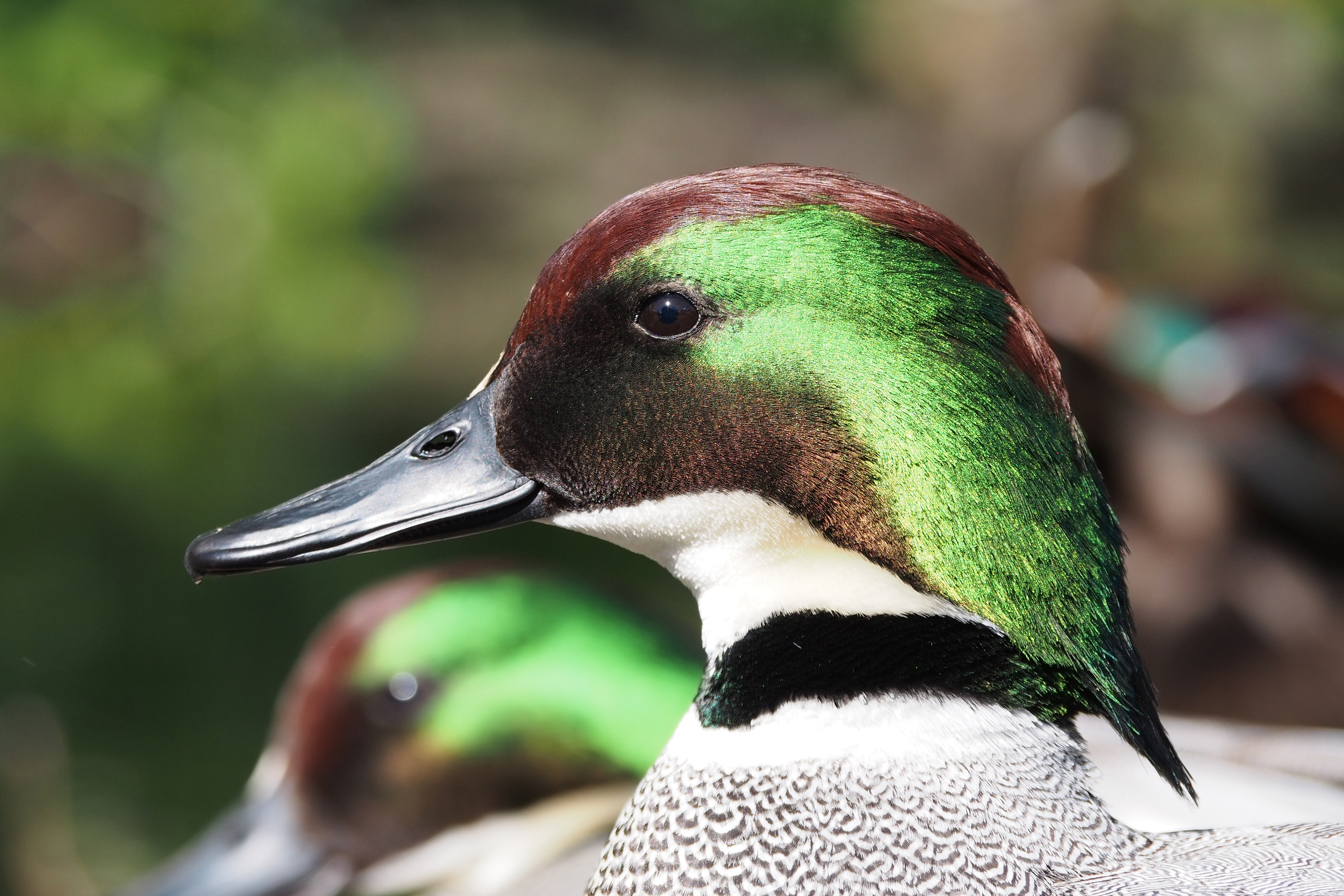
Male falcated duck

Males and females have similar lengths at 46 to 53 cm (18–21 in). Their weight can range from 422 to 770 g (14.9–27.2 oz), with males weighing more than their female counterparts. Wingspans range from 79 to 91 cm (31–36 in). The breeding male is unmistakable. Most of the body plumage is finely vermiculated grey, with the long sickle-shaped tertials, which give this species its name, hanging off its back. The large head is dark green with a white throat, and a dark green collar and bronzed crown. The vent region is patterned in yellow, black and white.

The female falcated duck is dark brown, with plumage much like a female wigeon. Its long grey bill is an aid to identification. The eclipse male is like the female, but darker on the back and head. In flight both sexes show a pale grey underwing. The blackish speculum is bordered with a white bar on its inner edge. Young birds are buffer than the female and have short tertials.

Juveniles have plumage similar to females of the species.

These ducks are usually quiet except on breeding territory. The male duck has a shrill whistle tyu-tyu-vit…tyu-vit…tyu-tyu-vit (Dementiev and Gladkov 1952) and a quiet whistle ending with a wavering uit-trr (Flint et al. 1984). The female duck has a hoarse, quack, short two-syllable inciting call, and a high pitched, two to four syllable Decrescendo call (Lorenz and Von de Wall 1960).

== Behavior ==
=== Diet and role in ecosystem ===
Falcated ducks have food habits generally consisting of small invertebrate and other insects as well as plant foods. They mainly eat vegetation or insects near to the water, consuming animals such as larvae, crustaceans, and mollusks. They likewise eat plant foods: leaves as well as seeds, grains, and nuts. Many assume that the falcated duck helps disperse seeds over large areas because of their diet. These ducks are primarily herbivorous. These ducks are hosts to a number of different parasites (ticks, fleas, lice) and thus carry diseases such as: the West Nile virus, avian influenza, avian pox, salmonellosis, staphylococcosis, and E. coli. Moreover, they carry viruses, bacteria, fungi and protozoans that can be transferred to other creatures, for instance vertebrates and even humans.

=== Breeding and life cycle ===
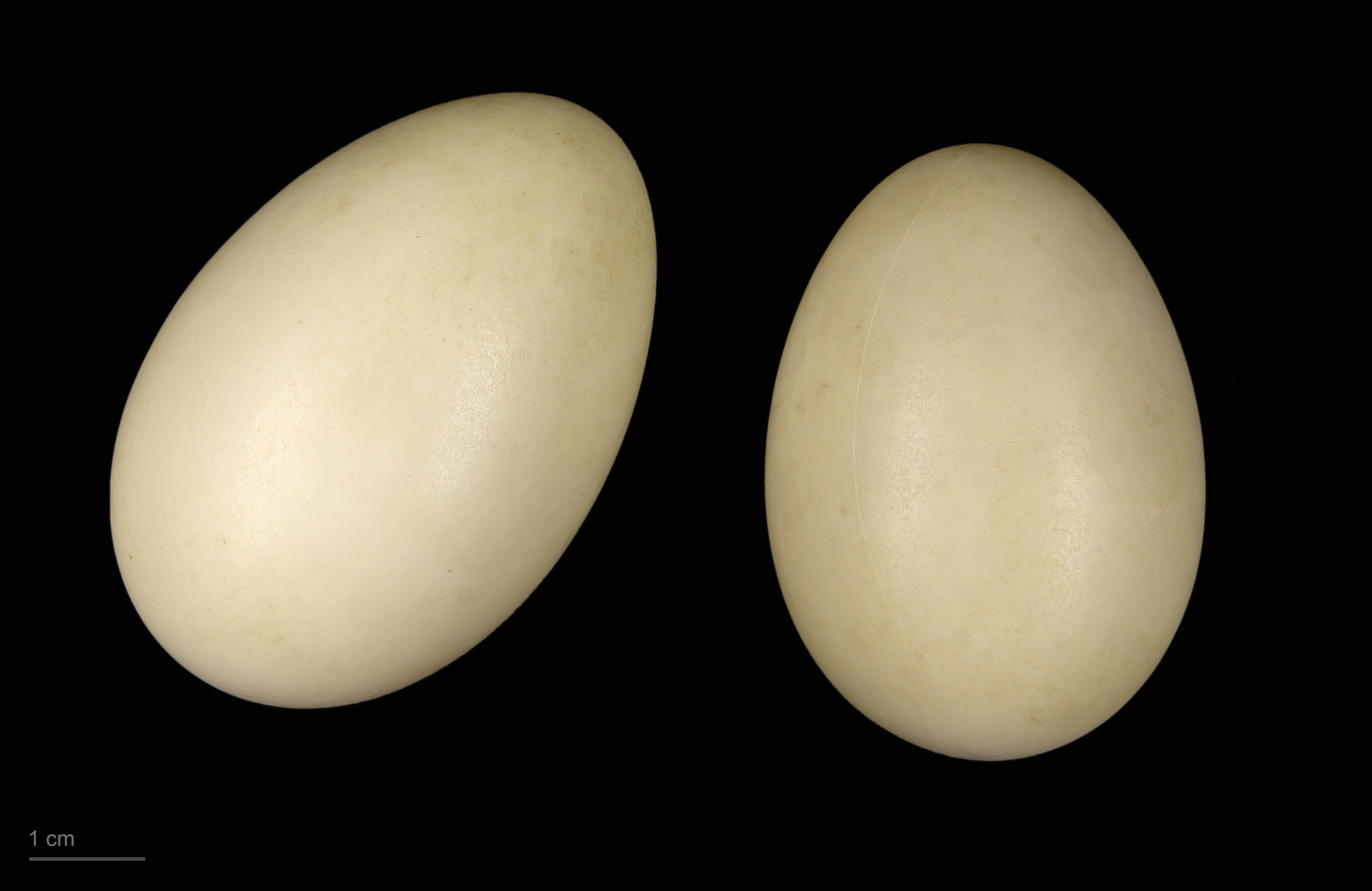
Eggs of falcated duck

The clutch is 6–10 eggs. Eggs are generally laid in late May. They have their nests on the ground in thick grasses, tussocks, swamped shrubbery, or hidden in deadwood. Usually the eggs are nested near water but have also been seen in small bushes approximately 80 m (260 ft) from the water. The eggs have a color of white with a pinkish yellow tint. Females incubate the eggs alone, 24–25 days in captivity. The males will leave the female during incubation.

Falcated ducks have a very intricate courtship ritual. Females perform a series of inciting calls and other movements while preening behind the wings of their targeted male. Males use a courting method similar to others in the Anas genus, including an introductory shake, a neck-stretching burp call, a grunt whistle, and a head-up-tail-up display. During the mating season the falcated ducks form monogamous pairs that last throughout the mating season. It is not known how long the falcated duck lifespan is. There is also not much information on their territory size because these ducks are not studied as closely as other more popular species like swans or geese.

=== Hybridization ===
A fieldwork study at Hyo-ko Waterfowl Park, a nature preserve in Niigata, Japan, found what they presumed was a male hybrid of a falcated duck and a Eurasian wigeon. They have found these "wild" hybrids in several instances over the past few years. These birds shared morphological traits with both species. Still, most of the traits favored the falcated duck. It was reported that these hybrid birds have joined courting parties of Eurasian wigeon and even attempted to compete with wigeon males. Grunt-whistling, and burping calls being the method of inciting courtship, even resemble that of the falcated duck and not of the Eurasian wigeon. The hybrid bird most be closely watched, was quite sexually active, however, it is not yet known if they can reproduce with either of the female species.

Hybridization between two different species often leaves the offspring sterile, but this genus shows a surprising amount of hybrid fertility. This hybrid species performed courtship rituals more closely related to the falcated duck, yet socially was active in Eurasian wigeon flocks. Successful reproduction was not seen between the hybrid species and a pure Eurasian wigeon female during the fieldwork study. Further study of hybrid avian species can help shed light onto avian reproduction and their evolutionary biology.

== Conservation ==
=== Threats ===
A primary threat to the falcated duck is hunting, as people want them for food and their feathers. Their habitat loss is also caused by the drainage of the wetlands. Although the overall population of the falcated duck is larger than once believed and is no longer classified as an endangered species, it is still considered "near threatened" on the IUCN's (or the International Union for the Conservation of Nature's) Animal Red List.

=== Human influence on population ===
The falcated duck requires coastal wetlands for its survival. One of the most ecologically sensitive areas in the world is the eastern end of Nanhui county, China, and is a site for the falcated duck during the migratory season. This area is crucial for the falcated duck due to its population being extremely low. Urbanization and economic growth of this area has led to a significant environmental disturbance in this area. A reclamation project to create artificial wetlands was started in 1999 and finished in 2005. Studies have been done to see if the artificial wetlands were as efficient as the natural ones, and although the artificial wetlands did see migratory shorebirds present, their population was not as high as the natural wetlands. Much more research needs to be done before the artificial wetlands can match the natural wetlands, and provide an acceptable habitat for the falcated duck.

Around the time of the harvesting seasons during the Chinese spring festival of winter in Nanhui County of Shanghai, China, the pond managers drain the water in the pond in order to catch fish for commercial purposes. Around that time, the pond was dominated by falcated ducks roosting there. After the pond is drained it remains dry until the following spring when water is replenished for fresh cultivation. The time that the water is replenished is very critical for migrant waterbirds in the spring. If the water is replenished too late then the dry pond is inapt for shorebirds and herons.

=== Status and protection ===
The falcated duck is currently in a state of near threatened on the IUCN's Red List. They are protected under the Migratory Bird Treaty Act, and their overall population seems to be (for the most part) stable and growing. Falcated duck populations are present in a number of wildlife preservers, national parks and other protected areas, and zoos.

=== Proposed actions ===
There are several proposed plans of action in protecting the falcated duck. Conservationists are keen to continue monitoring populations that have unfortunately stopped breeding, and plan to petition for hunting and shooting regulations on both the local and national level, respectively. Conservationists are also aware as to the great lack of education in regards to waterfowl extinction. For hunters who make a living off of either using the falcated duck as a food source or from simple sport hunts, conservationists are looking for alternative employment opportunities. Finally, conservationists hope to improve the management and coordination of already existing nature reserves where the falcated duck is present.
