= Troth Yeddha' =

Mountain ridge in Fairbanks, Alaska, USA

- College Hill
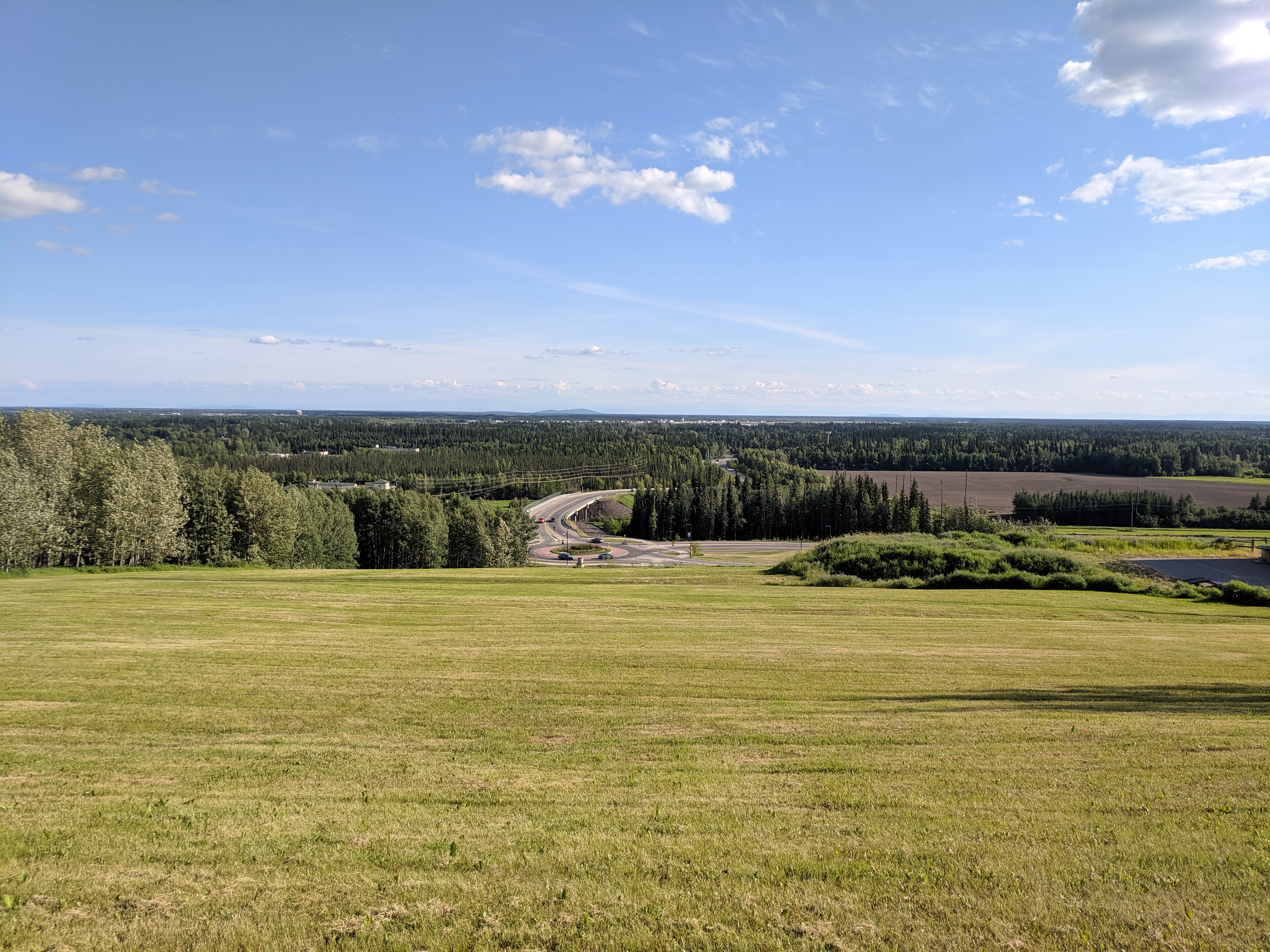
- The view down Troth Yeddha' towards Fairbanks

Highest point
- Elevation: 623 ft (190 m)
- Coordinates: 64°51′31″N 147°50′21″W

Geography
- Location within Alaska
- Location: Fairbanks North Star Borough

Troth Yeddha' is the name of the prominent ridge on which the University of Alaska Fairbanks is currently located. In February 2013, the US Board of Geographic Names approved the university supported proposal to officially rename the ridge.

The name is derived from the Lower Tanana Athabascan words troth, meaning 'Indian potato' or 'wild potato' (Hedysarum alpinum) and yeddha', meaning 'ridge'.

The 2200 acre east–west trending ridge has had no official name. Portions of the ridge are referred to unofficially in English as 'College Hill' or 'University Ridge'.

The name Troth Yeddha' is one of a suite of Lower Tanana place names in the university area reflecting the base troth. These include:

- Tr'exwghodegi Troth Yeddha' Bena' – Smith Lake (literally: 'upper wild potato ridge lake')
- Tr'exwghotthigi Troth Yeddha' Bena' – Ballaine Lake (literally: 'lower wild potato ridge lake')
- Troth Ghotthiit – Geist Road - Fairbanks Street area (literally: 'toward the water from Indian potato')

In 2008 the University of Alaska Fairbanks dedicated the land between the Museum of the North and the Reichardt Building as Troth Yeddha' Park. A design for the park is being developed.
