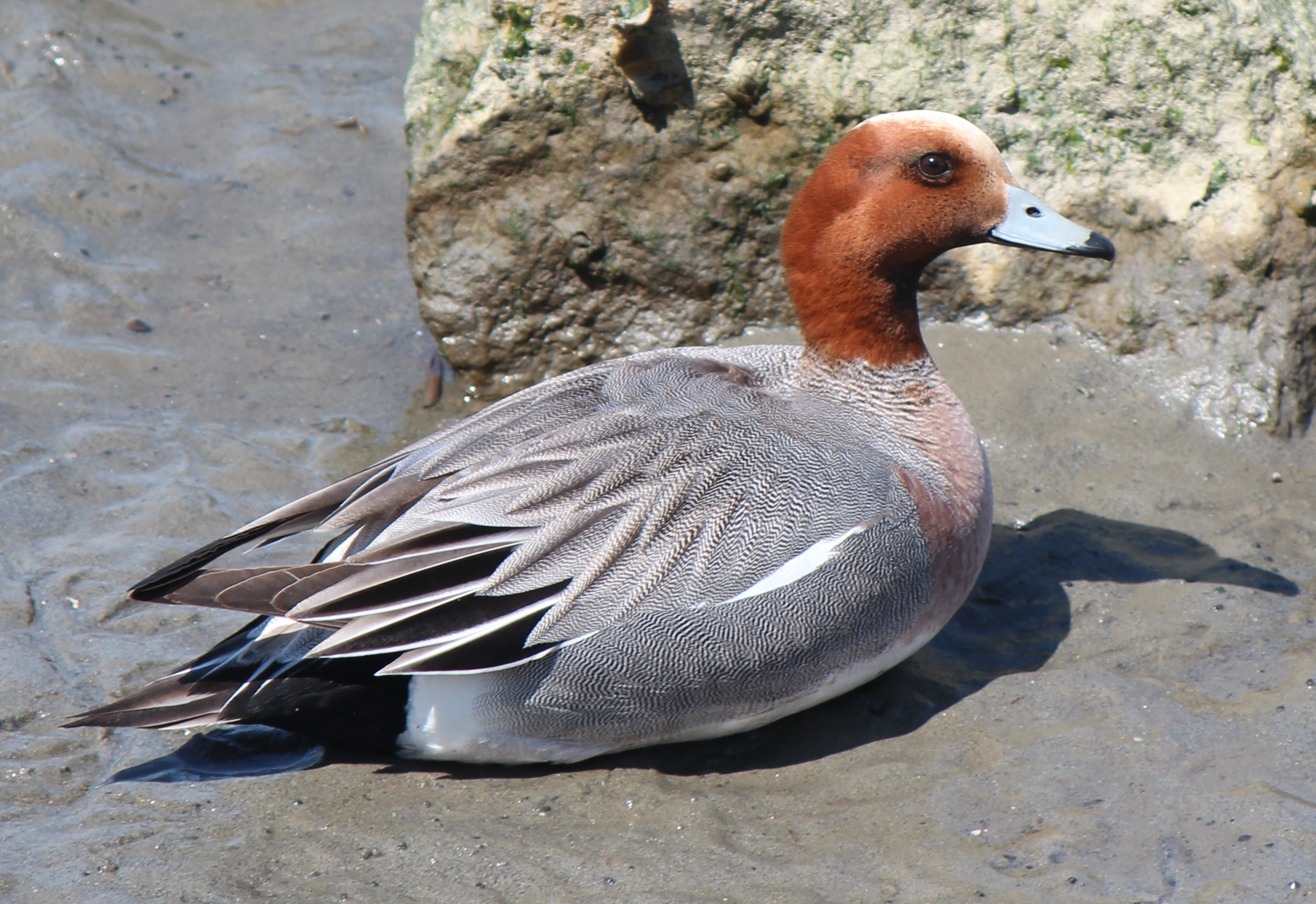
- Eurasian wigeon, Mareca penelope

Scientific classification
- Kingdom: Animalia
- Phylum: Chordata
- Class: Aves
- Order: Anseriformes
- Family: Anatidae
- Tribe: Anatini
- Genus: Mareca; Stephens, 1824

Type species
- Anas penelope Linnaeus, 1758

Synonyms
- Anas (Mareca)

= Mareca =

Genus of birds

Mareca is a genus or subgenus of ducks in the family Anatidae that includes the wigeons.

The genus Mareca was introduced by English naturalist James Francis Stephens in 1824. The type species is the Eurasian wigeon. The name of the genus is from the Portuguese word Marreco for a small duck. The species now placed in this genus were formerly placed in the genus Anas. A molecular phylogentic study comparing mitochondrial DNA sequences published in 2009 found that the genus Anas, as then defined, was not monophyletic. Based on the published phylogeny, the genus Anas was split into four monophyletic genera with five extant species moved into the resurrected genus Mareca.

== Species ==
The genus Mareca contains five extant species and one extinct species:

Genus Mareca – Stephens, 1824 – two species
Common name	Scientific name and subspecies	Range	Size and ecology	IUCN status and estimated population
Gadwall Male Female	Mareca strepera (Linnaeus, 1758) two subspecies: M. s. strepera (Linnaeus, 1758); †M. s. couesi (Streets, 1876)	Europe, Asia and central North America	Size: Habitat: Diet:	LC
Falcated duck Male Female	Mareca falcata (Georgi, 1775)	Eastern Asia	Size: Habitat: Diet:	LC
Eurasian wigeon Male Female	Mareca penelope (Linnaeus, 1758)	Europe and Asia	Size: Habitat: Diet:	LC
Chiloé wigeon Male Female	Mareca sibilatrix (Poeppig, 1829)	Southern South America	Size: Habitat: Diet:	LC
American wigeon Male Female	Mareca americana (Gmelin, JF, 1789)	North of Canada and Alaska and also in the Interior West through Idaho, Colorado, the Dakotas, and Minnesota, as well as eastern Washington and Oregon	Size: Habitat: Diet:	LC
†Amsterdam wigeon	Mareca marecula (Olson & Jouventin, 1996)	Île Amsterdam in the French Southern and Antarctic Lands	Size: Habitat: Diet:	EX

== Phylogeny ==
Cladogram based on the analysis of Gonzalez and colleagues published in 2009.

- Mareca
  - - - American wigeon
      - Chiloé wigeon
    - Eurasian wigeon
  - - Falcated teal
    - Gadwall
