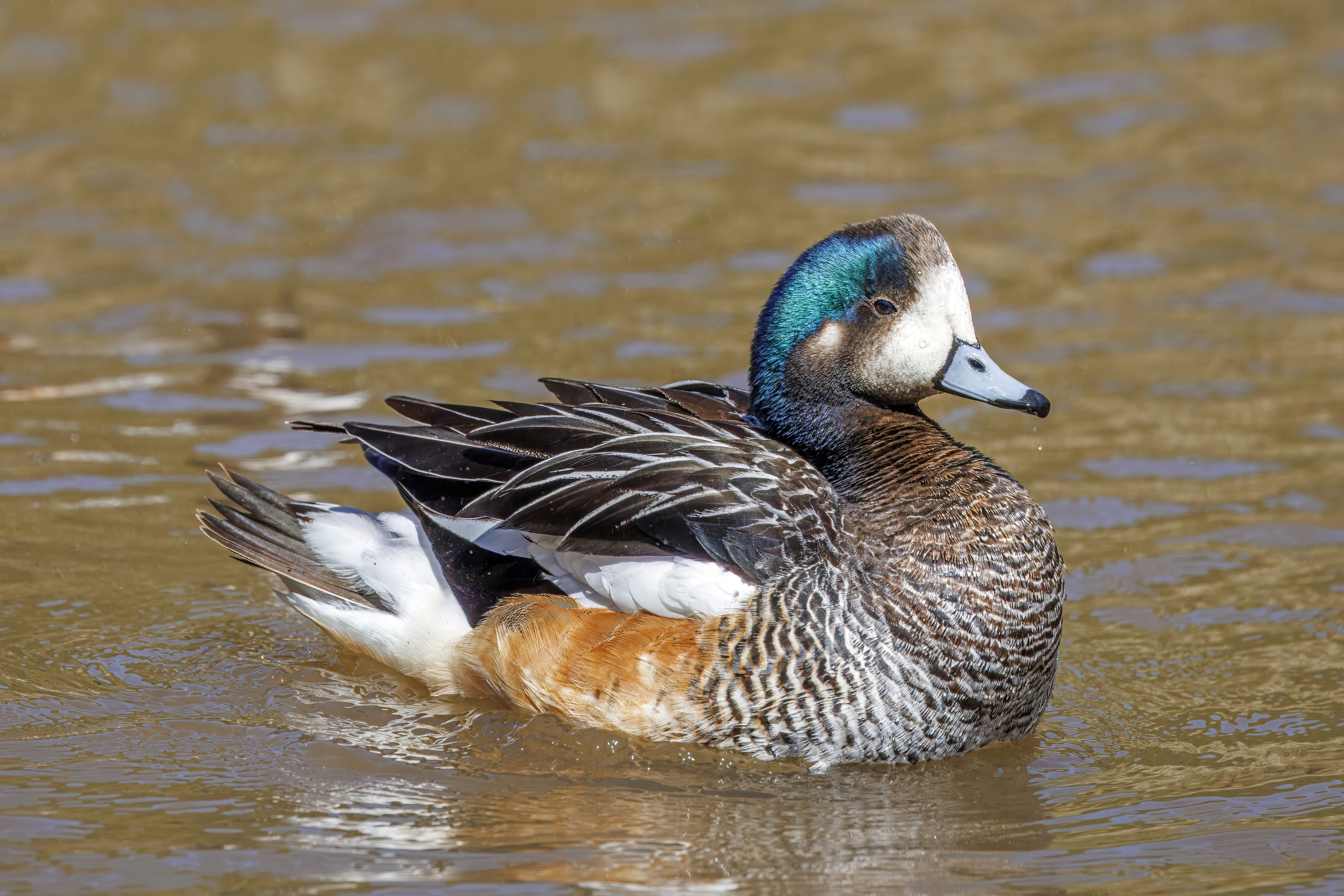
- Adult male
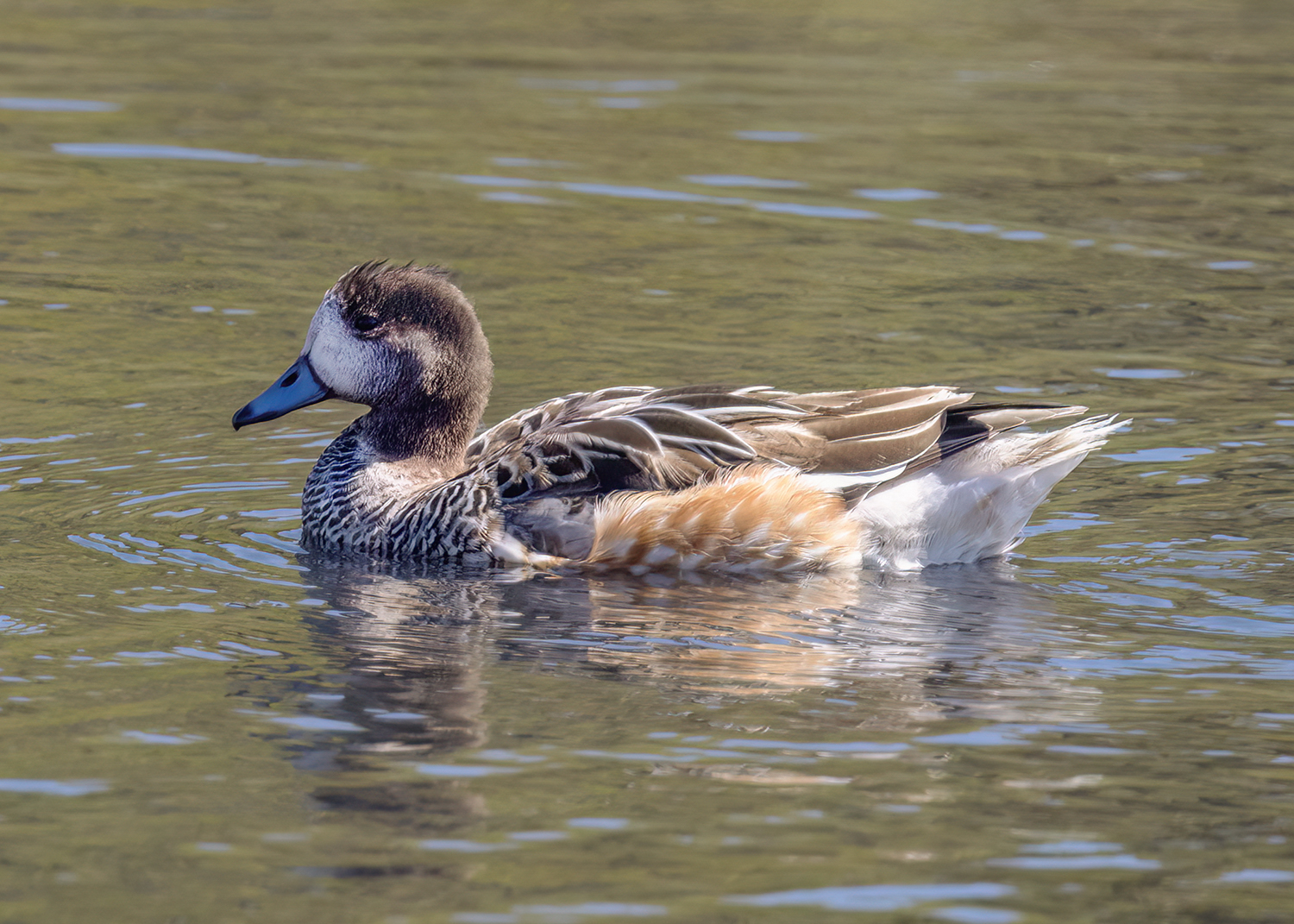
- Adult female

Conservation status
- Least Concern (IUCN 3.1)

Scientific classification
- Kingdom: Animalia
- Phylum: Chordata
- Class: Aves
- Order: Anseriformes
- Family: Anatidae
- Genus: Mareca
- Species: M. sibilatrix

Binomial name
- Mareca sibilatrix (Poeppig, 1829)

Synonyms
- Anas sibilatrix Poeppig, 1829

= Chiloé wigeon =

Species of bird

The Chiloé wigeon (Mareca sibilatrix), also known as the southern wigeon, is one of three extant species of wigeon in the genus Mareca of the dabbling duck subfamily. This bird is indigenous to the southern part of South America, including the Chiloé Archipelago, from which it gets its name. In its native range, it is called the pato overo ("piebald duck") or pato real ("royal duck"), although the latter name also refers to the Muscovy in the wild. Its specific epithet, sibilatrix, means 'whistler', referring to the bird's call.

== Description ==
The Chiloé wigeon has a body length of 46 to 56 cm (18 to 22 in) and a wingspan of 75 to 86 cm (30 to 34 in). The wing length is about 25 cm (9.8 in) and the weight is approximately 800 g (28 oz).

This bird has an iridescent green-blue cap on its head, and a bluish gray bill with a black tip. The cheeks and forehead are white, the eyes are dark brown, and there is a white auricular patch. The neck and occipital part of the head are black. The breast is barred black and white and the plumage of the wings is gray and white. The flanks of males are rust colored, and light brown on females. The legs and feet are gray.

Sexual dimorphism is relatively subtle in this species of wigeon. Males are usually somewhat larger and heavier, and with somewhat brighter plumage and more strongly pronounced iridescence of the cap. Apart from these features, it can be difficult to distinguish the two sexes. Juveniles resemble adult birds, but the rust coloring on the flanks is diminished or absent.

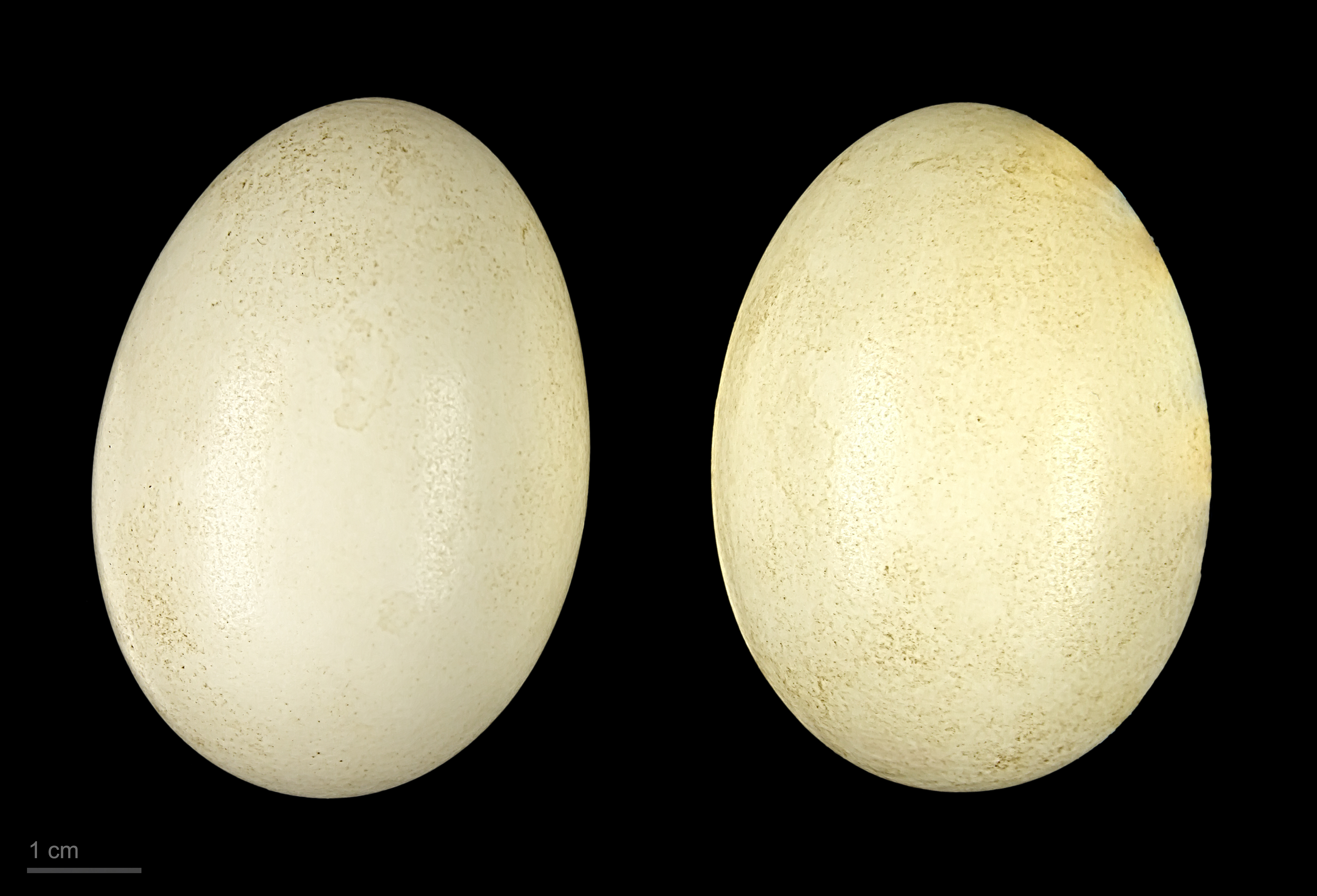
Mareca sibilatrix - MHNT

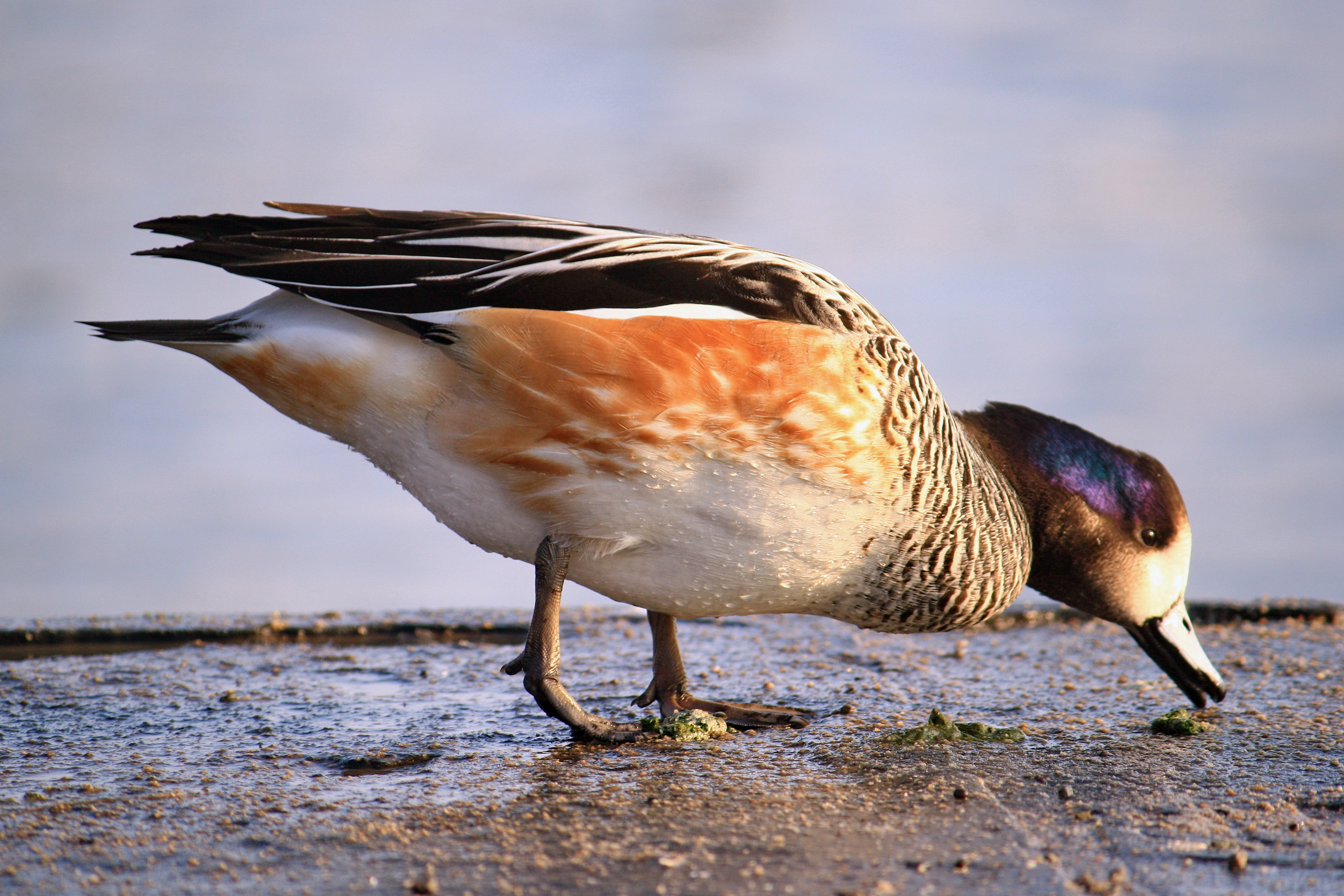
Searching for food

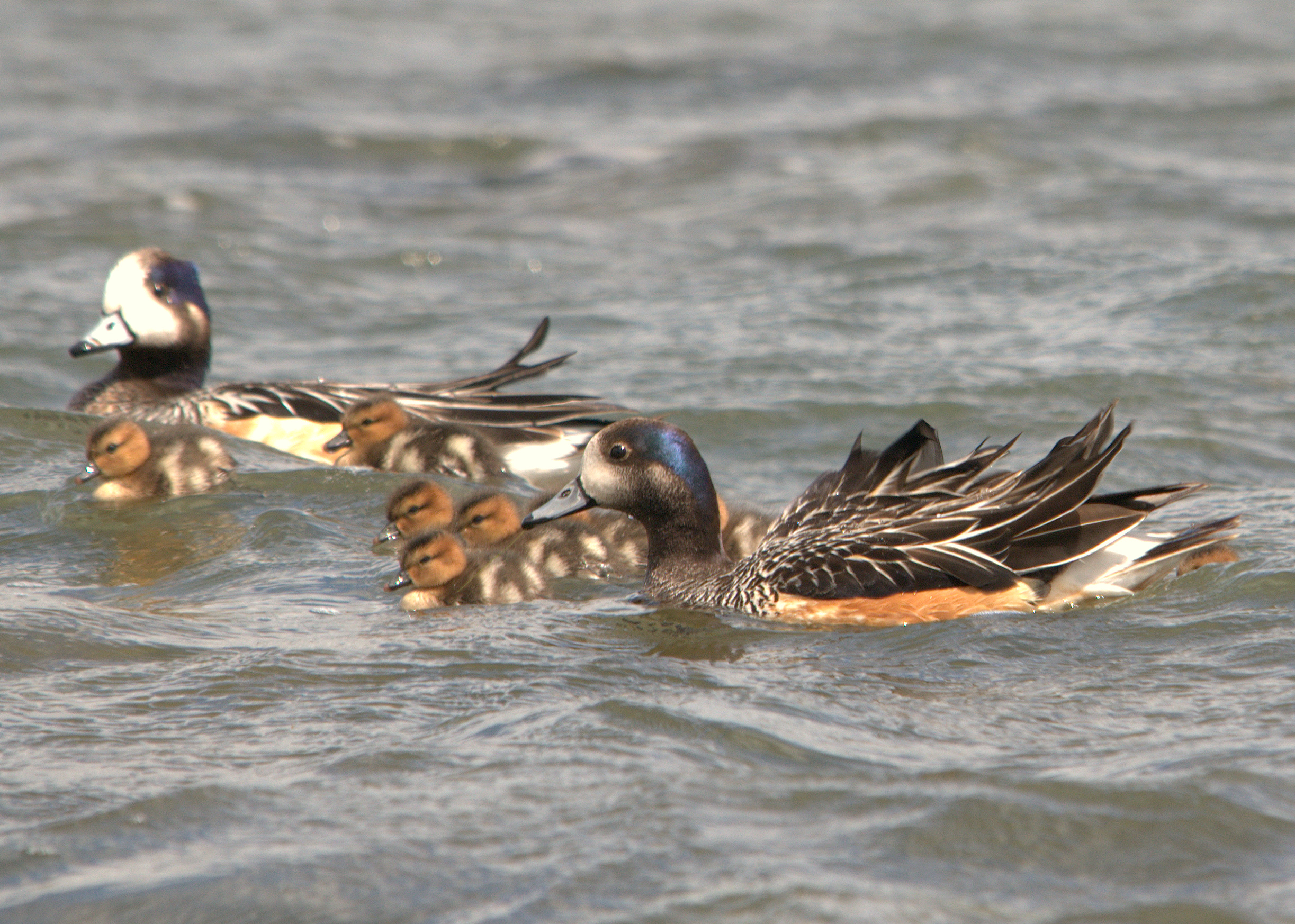
Family in Patagonia

== Distribution and habitat ==
This duck is indigenous to the southern part of South America, where it is found on freshwater lakes, marshes, shallow lagoons and slow flowing rivers. Vagrants have been observed in South Georgia, South Orkney and the South Shetland Islands.

It breeds primarily in Argentina, Uruguay, and Chile. The northern border of the breeding range is in Argentina at 36° S and Chile at 40° S. It also breeds sparingly in the Falkland Islands. It migrates to southeastern Brazil for the winter.

It was first introduced to Europe in 1870; it soon bred in zoos.

Because the Chiloé wigeon is widely distributed and has a large, stable wild population, it is categorized as least concern by the IUCN.

== Ecology and behavior ==
The Chiloé wigeon displays a variety of behaviors depending on habitat. It is an omnivore, feeding predominantly on aquatic plants and grass, and occasionally coastal algae.

This monogamous species breeds in the austral spring, between September and December. Pairs inhabit very small breeding territories, building their nests in grasses and under bushes. The female lays eight to ten white or cream-colored eggs. After a gestation period of approximately 24–25 days the ducklings are born. The father helps raise the ducklings; however, he leaves the family after the offspring molt.

Captive hybrids with the Philippine Duck (Anas luzonica) have been described.

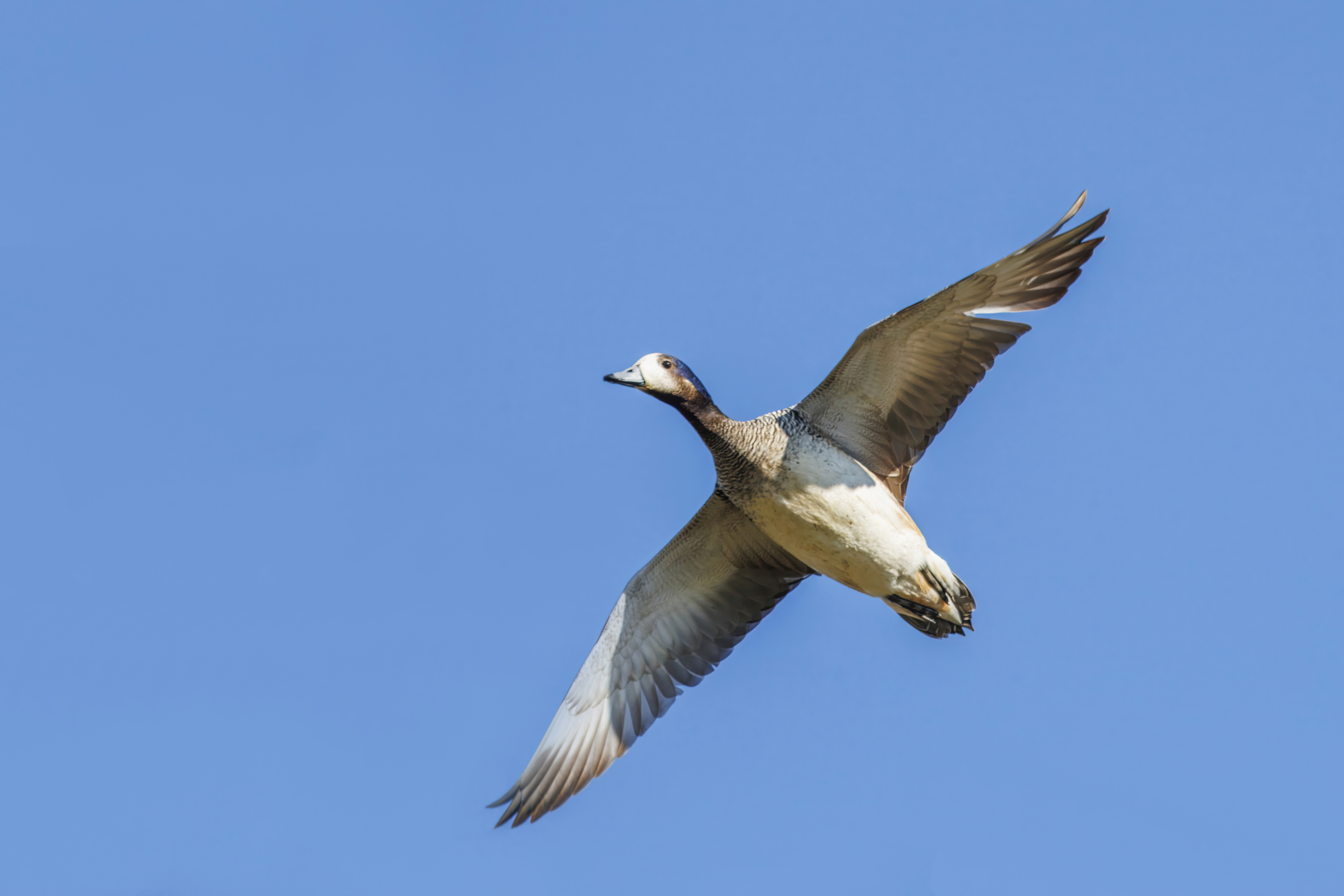

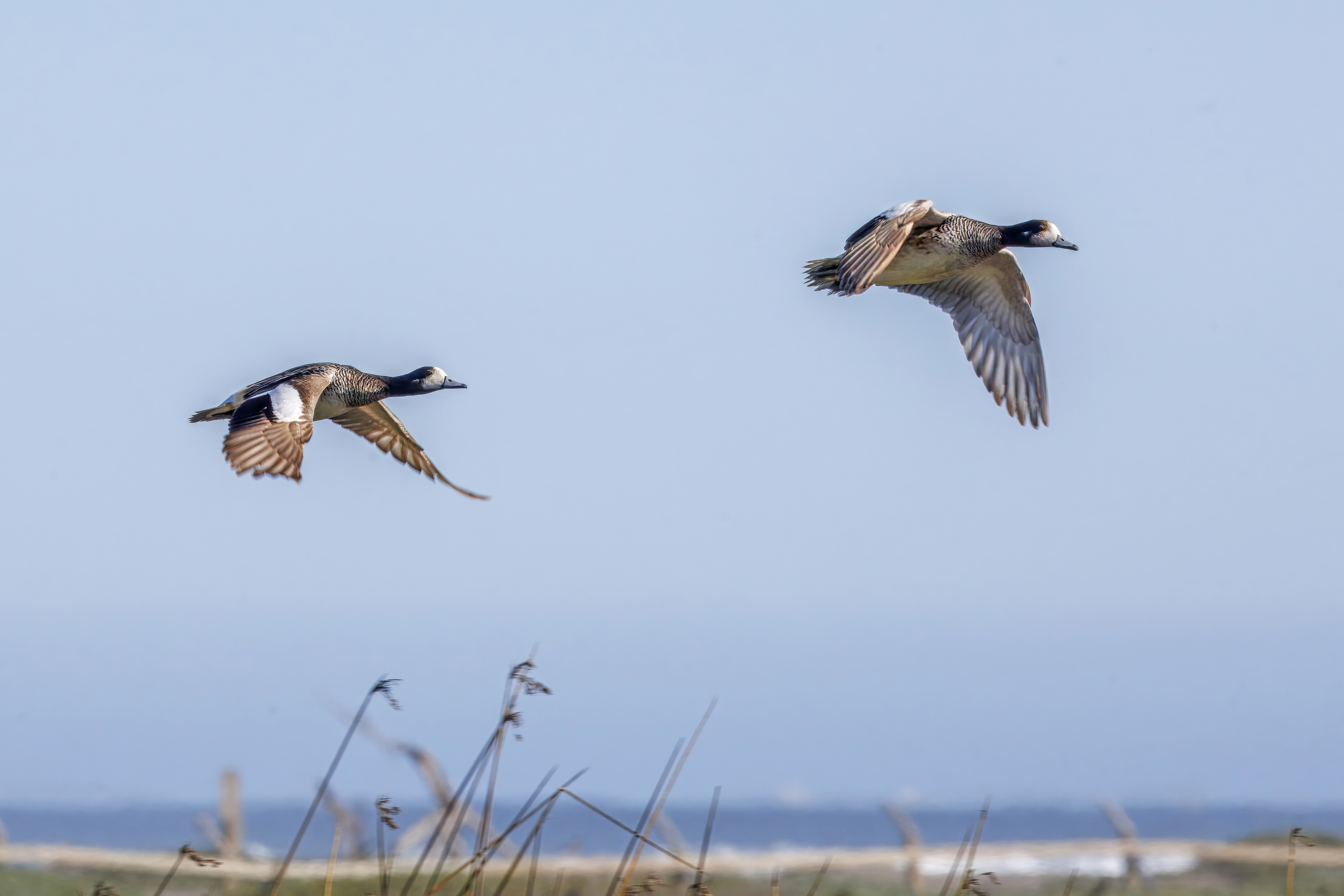

=== Parasites ===
This species is host to a variety of parasitic species which include chewing lice, feather mites, nasal mites, tapeworms, nematodes and trematodes.

== Works cited ==
- Kolbe, Hartmut; The Ducks of the World, Ulmer Verlag 1999, ISBN 3-8001-7442-1
- Woods, A, Woods, R: Atlas of Breeding Birds of the Falkland Islands, Anthony Nelson, Shropshire 1997, ISBN 0-904614-60-3
