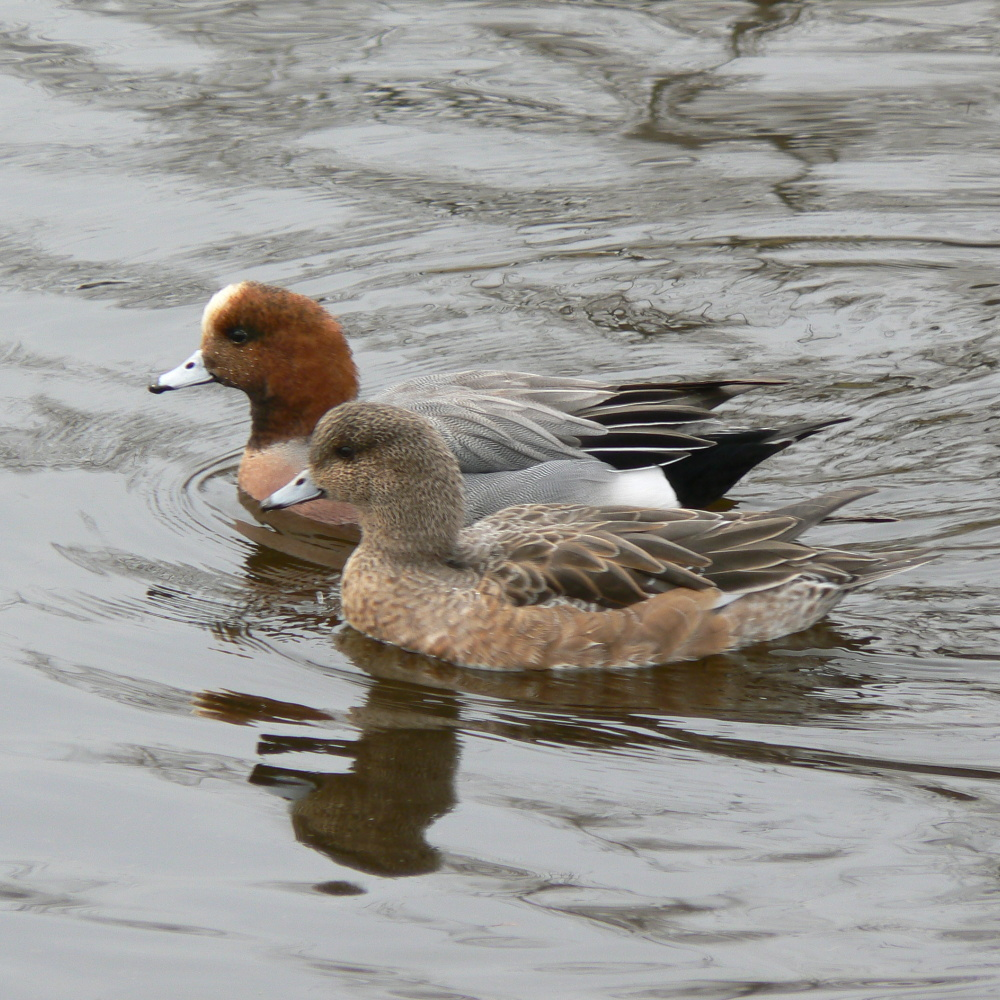
- Male (rear) and female (front) Eurasian wigeons.
- Eurasian wigeon calls recorded in Dorset, England

Scientific classification
- Kingdom: Animalia
- Phylum: Chordata
- Class: Aves
- Order: Anseriformes
- Family: Anatidae
- Genus: Mareca

Wigeon species
- Mareca americana; Mareca sibilatrix; Mareca penelope; †Mareca marecula (extinct, c.1800)

= Wigeon =

Wigeons

Name given to some birds in the genus Mareca

The wigeons or widgeons are a group of birds, dabbling ducks currently classified in the genus Mareca along with two other species. There are three extant species of wigeon, in addition to one recently extinct species.

== Biology ==
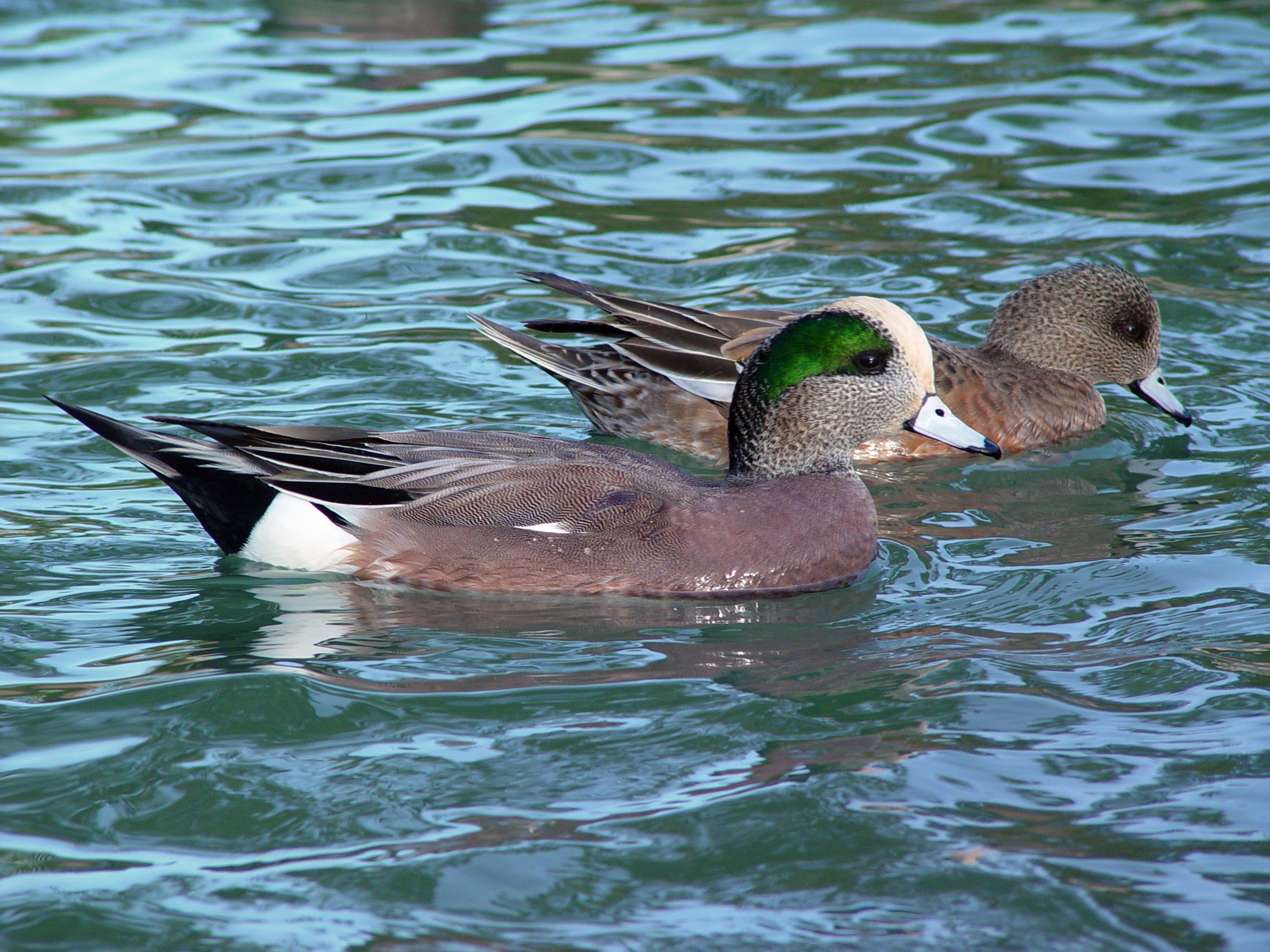
Male (front) and female (rear) American wigeons

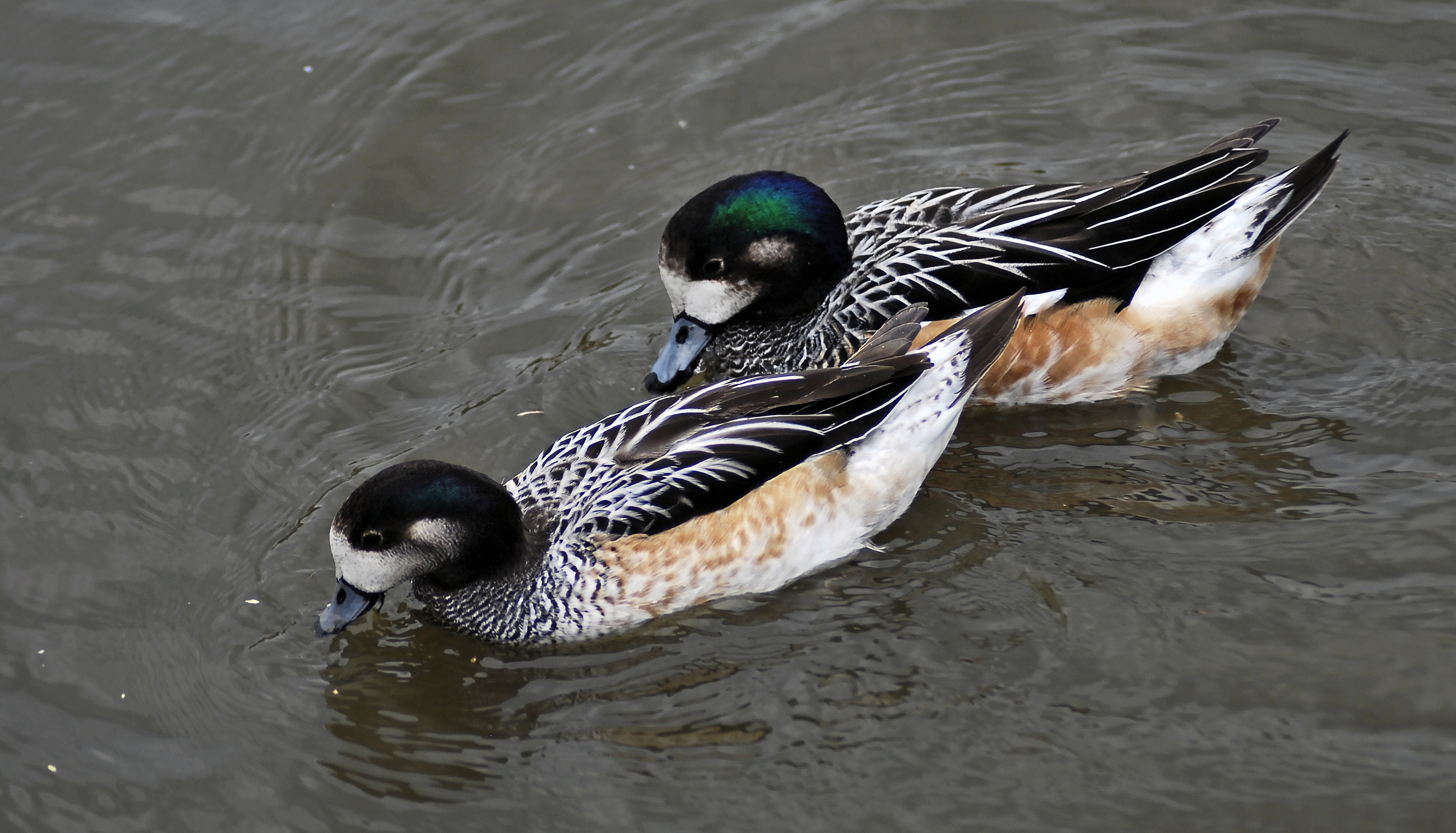
Male (rear) and female (front) Chiloé wigeons

There are three extant species: the Eurasian wigeon (Mareca penelope; formerly Anas penelope), the American wigeon (M. americana; formerly A. americana) and the Chiloé wigeon (M. sibilatrix; formerly A. sibilatrix). A fourth species, the Amsterdam wigeon (M. marecula; formerly A. marecula), became extinct in the 19th century. The wigeons' closest relatives, forming with them the genus Mareca, are the Gadwall and the Falcated Duck.

All three wigeons are similarly shaped, with a steep forehead and bulbous rear to the head. All three wigeon species hybridise in captivity while American and Eurasian wigeons hybridise in the wild. An American Wigeon × Mallard hybrid has also been recorded.

The American wigeon was formerly called the baldpate by ornithologists, and some people still use that name, especially hunters.

The diet of the wigeon consists mainly of grass leaves (~80%); other food types eaten are seeds (~10%) and roots and stems (~5%).

Wigeons were formerly classified in the genus Anas but following a study in 2009 five extant species (3 species of wigeon, plus gadwall and falcated duck) were transferred to the resurrected genus Mareca.
