= Smith Lake (Murray County, Minnesota) =

Lake in the state of Minnesota, United States

- Location within Minnesota
- Location: Murray County, Minnesota
- Coordinates: 44°5′40″N 95°41′12″W
- Type: lake

Smith Lake is a lake in Murray County, in the U.S. state of Minnesota.

Smith Lake was named for Henry Watson Smith, an early settler.

== See also ==
- List of lakes in Minnesota
