= Smith Lake (Antarctica) =

- Location within Antarctica
- Location: Antarctica
- Coordinates: 66°7′S 101°17′E
- Type: lake

Smith Lake is a lake, 1 nautical mile (1.9 km) long, in the Bunger Hills, occupying the east half of the peninsula between Booth and Countess Peninsulas. First mapped from air photos taken by U.S. Navy Operation Highjump, 1946–47. The name "Smith Ridge" was given to the peninsula in 1956 by Advisory Committee on Antarctic Names (US-ACAN) but was later dropped. The lake has instead been named for Kenneth R. Smith, air crewman on the U.S. Navy Operation Highjump seaplane commanded by D.E. Bunger which landed in the area and obtained air and ground photos in February 1947.
