= Smith Lake (Berrien County, Michigan) =

- Location within Michigan
- Location: Berrien County
- Coordinates: 41°57′20″N 86°13′51″W
- Type: lake

Smith Lake is a lake in Berrien County, in the U.S. state of Michigan.

Smith Lake has the name of John Smith, the original owner of the site.
