= Smith Lake (Alaska) =

Lake in Fairbanks North Star Borough, Alaska

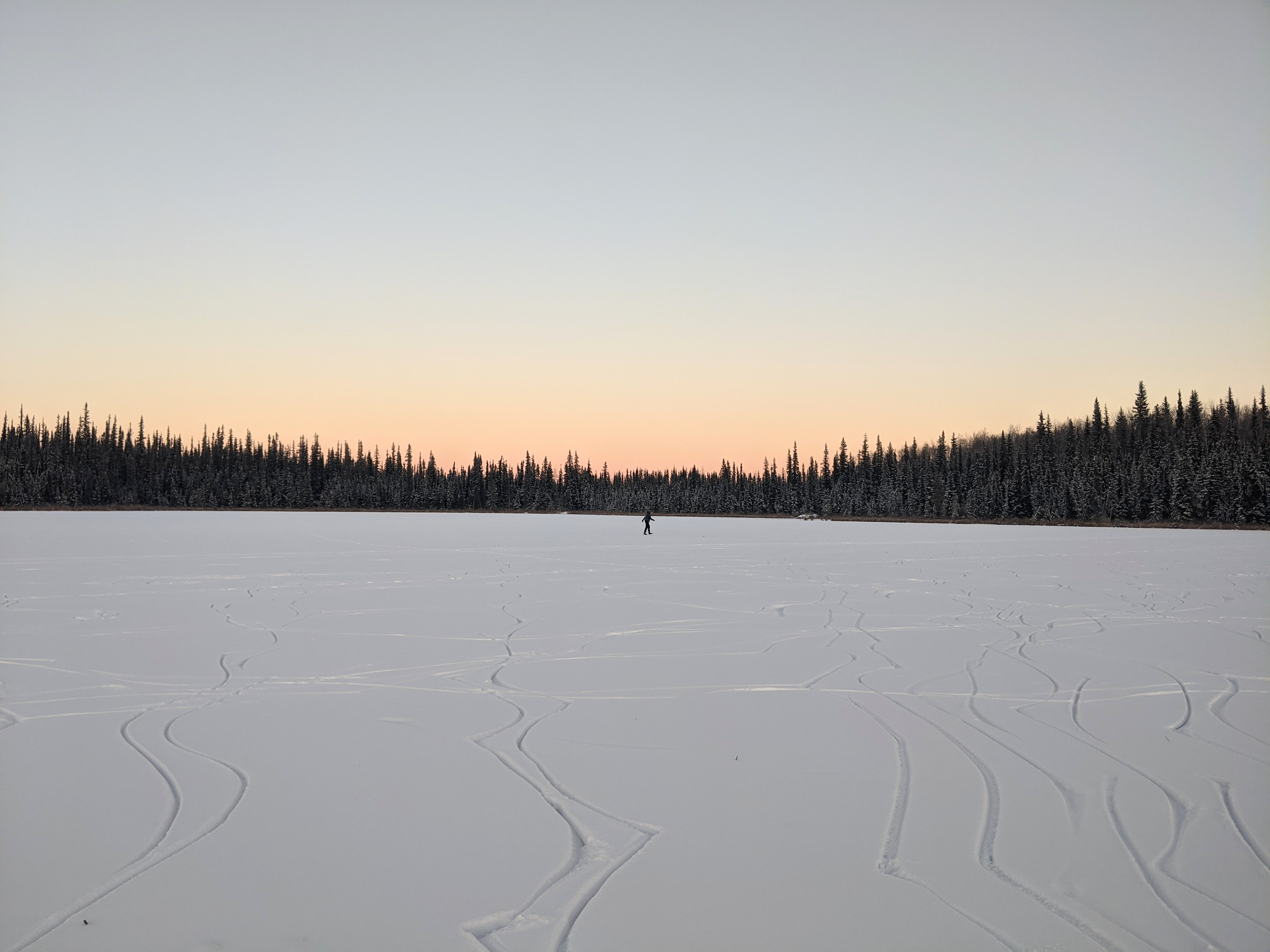
- Ice skater on Smith Lake, Fairbanks, Alaska. October 2020.

- Location within Alaska Location within North America
- Location: Fairbanks, Alaska
- Coordinates: 64.8658°N 147.8639°W
- Type: lake
- Max. length: 980 feet (300 m)
- Max. width: 980 feet (300 m)

Smith Lake (Athabascan: Tr'exwghodegi Troth Yeddha' Bena') is a lake in Fairbanks, Alaska on the property of the University of Alaska Fairbanks. It is triangular in shape, roughly 980 ft × 980 ft × 1,250 ft (300 m × 300 m × 380 m).

The university maintains ecological and hydrological monitoring sites at the lake.

== Wildlife ==
Smith lake is a good wildlife viewing location.

Bird species found at the lake may include Pacific loons, ring-necked duck, bufflehead, American wigeon, northern pintail, northern shoveler, green-winged teal, red-necked grebe, horned grebe, Bonaparte's gull, Wilson's snipe, lesser yellowlegs, long-billed dowitcher, red-necked phalarope, pectoral sandpiper and Bohemian waxwing.

== Recreation ==
In winter the frozen surface of Smith Lake is popular with ice skaters and cross-country skiers.
