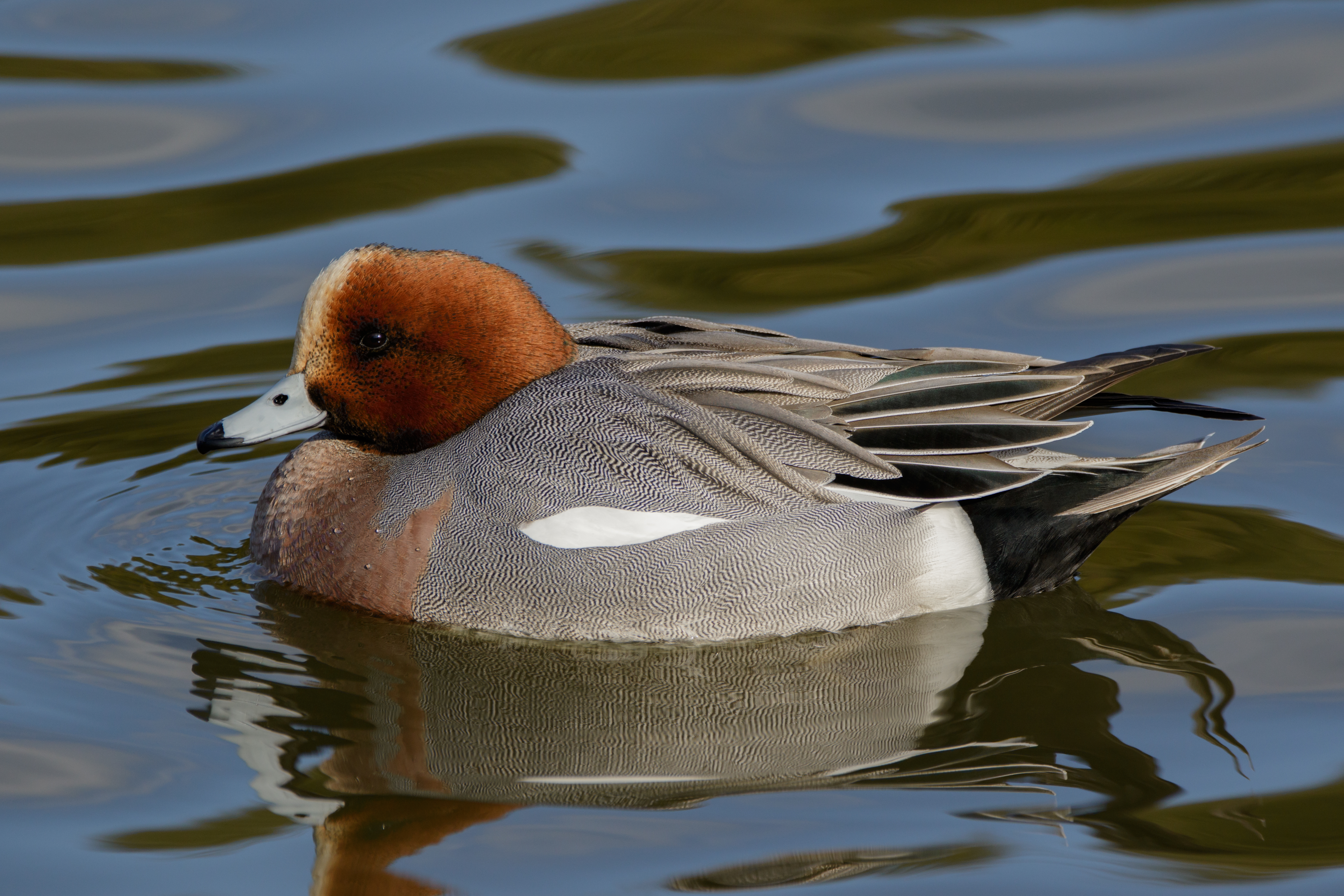
- Male
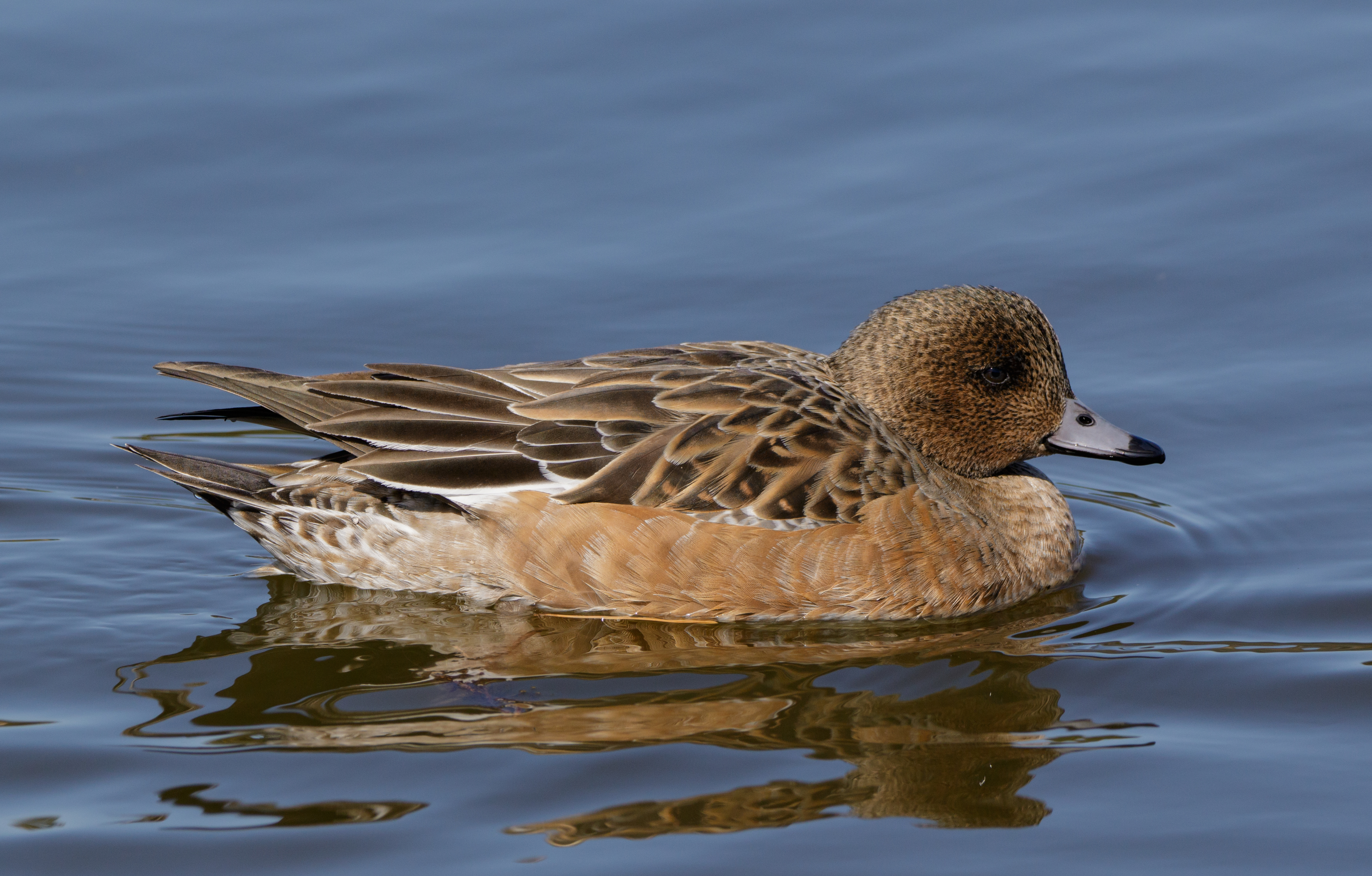
- Female Calls recorded in Dorset

Conservation status
- Least Concern (IUCN 3.1)

Scientific classification
- Kingdom: Animalia
- Phylum: Chordata
- Class: Aves
- Order: Anseriformes
- Family: Anatidae
- Genus: Mareca
- Species: M. penelope

Binomial name
- Mareca penelope (Linnaeus, 1758)

Synonyms
- Anas penelope Linnaeus, 1758

= Eurasian wigeon =

Species of bird

The Eurasian wigeon or European wigeon (Mareca penelope), also known as the widgeon or wigeon, is one of three extant species of wigeon in the dabbling duck genus Mareca. It is common and widespread within its Palearctic range.

== Taxonomy ==
The Eurasian wigeon was formally described by Carl Linnaeus in his landmark 1758 10th edition of Systema Naturae under the binomial name Anas penelope. Anas is the Latin word for "duck", and penelope refers to a duck said to have saved Penelope when she was thrown into the sea. Her name derives from Ancient Greek πήνη pene, "braid" and ὤψ ops "appearance", from the ruse she used to deter suitors while her husband Ulysses was away. Following a study in 2009, 5 species of Wigeon were transferred to the resurrected genus Mareca, so the current binomial name is now Mareca penelope.

== Description ==
This dabbling duck is 42–52 cm (17–20 in) long with a 71–80 cm (28–31 in) wingspan, and a weight of 500–1,073 g (1–2 lb). The breeding male has grey flanks and back, with a black rear end, a dark green speculum and a brilliant white patch on upper wings, visible in flight or at rest. It has a pink breast, white belly, and a chestnut head with a creamy crown. In non-breeding (eclipse) plumage, the drake looks more like the female. The female is light brown, with plumage similar to that of a female American wigeon. It can be distinguished from most other ducks, apart from American wigeon, by its shape. However, that species has a paler head and white axillaries on the underwings. The female can be a rufous morph with a redder head, and a gray morph with a grayer head.

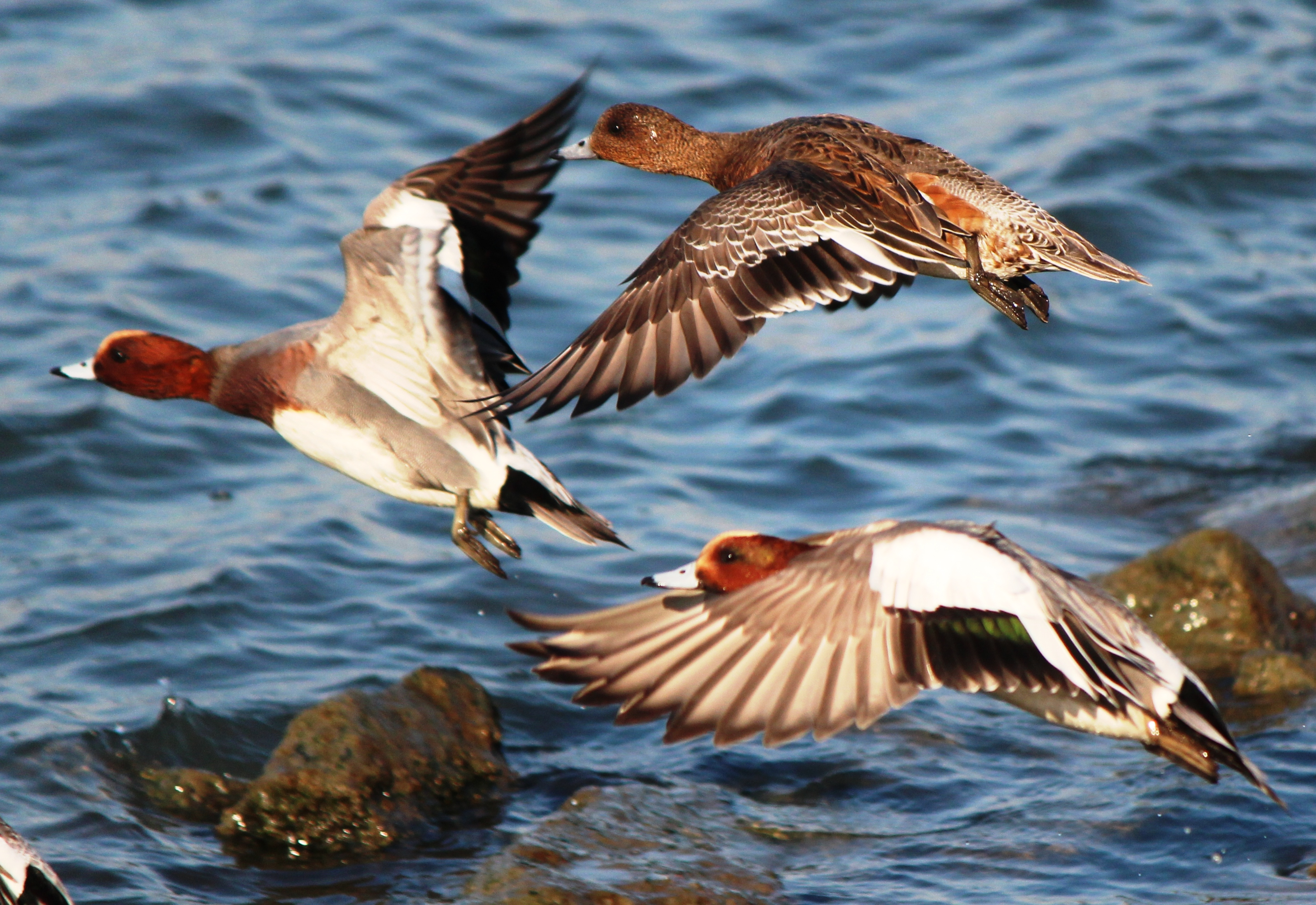
Two males and a female in flight

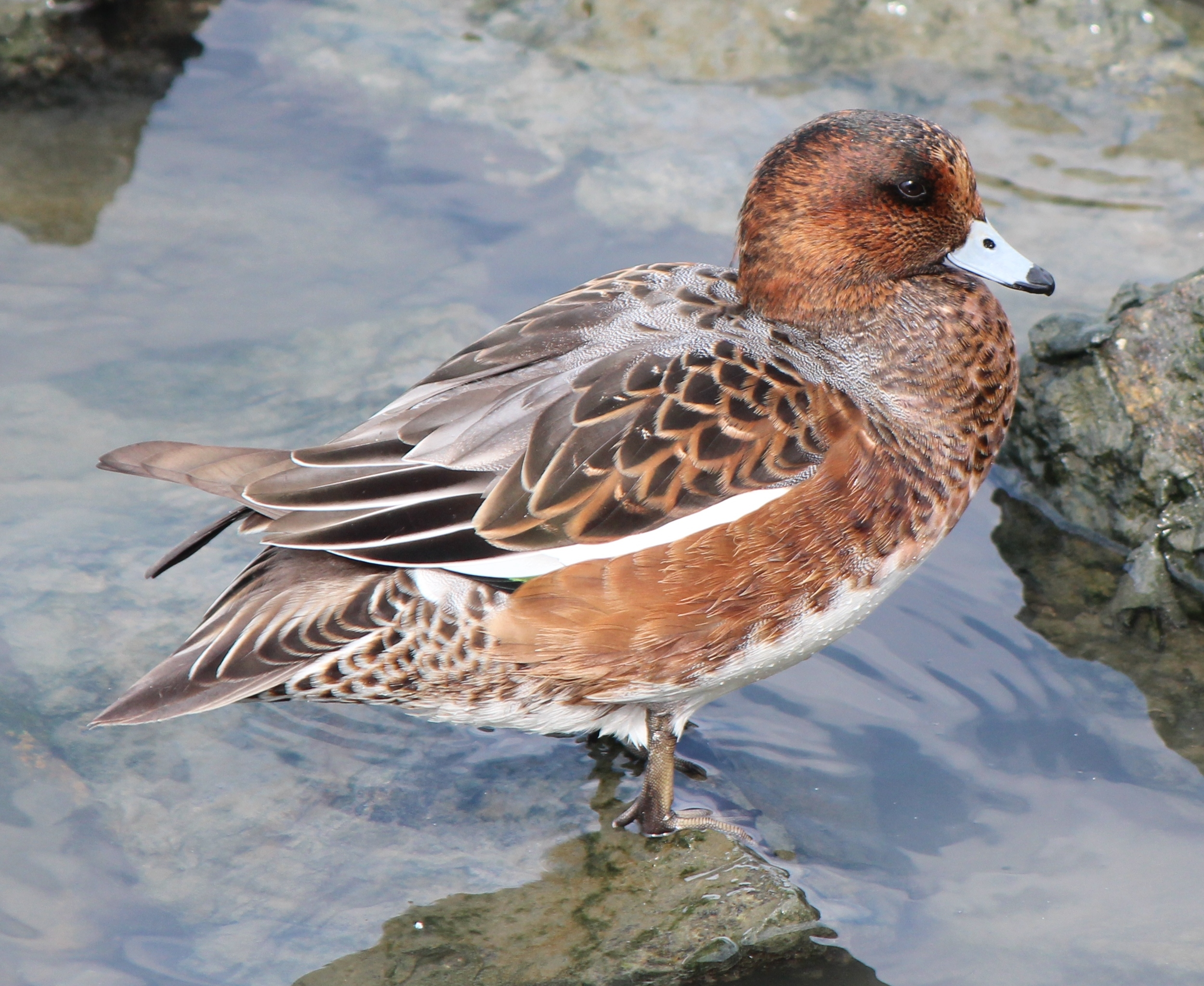
Male in eclipse plumage in Nagoya, Japan

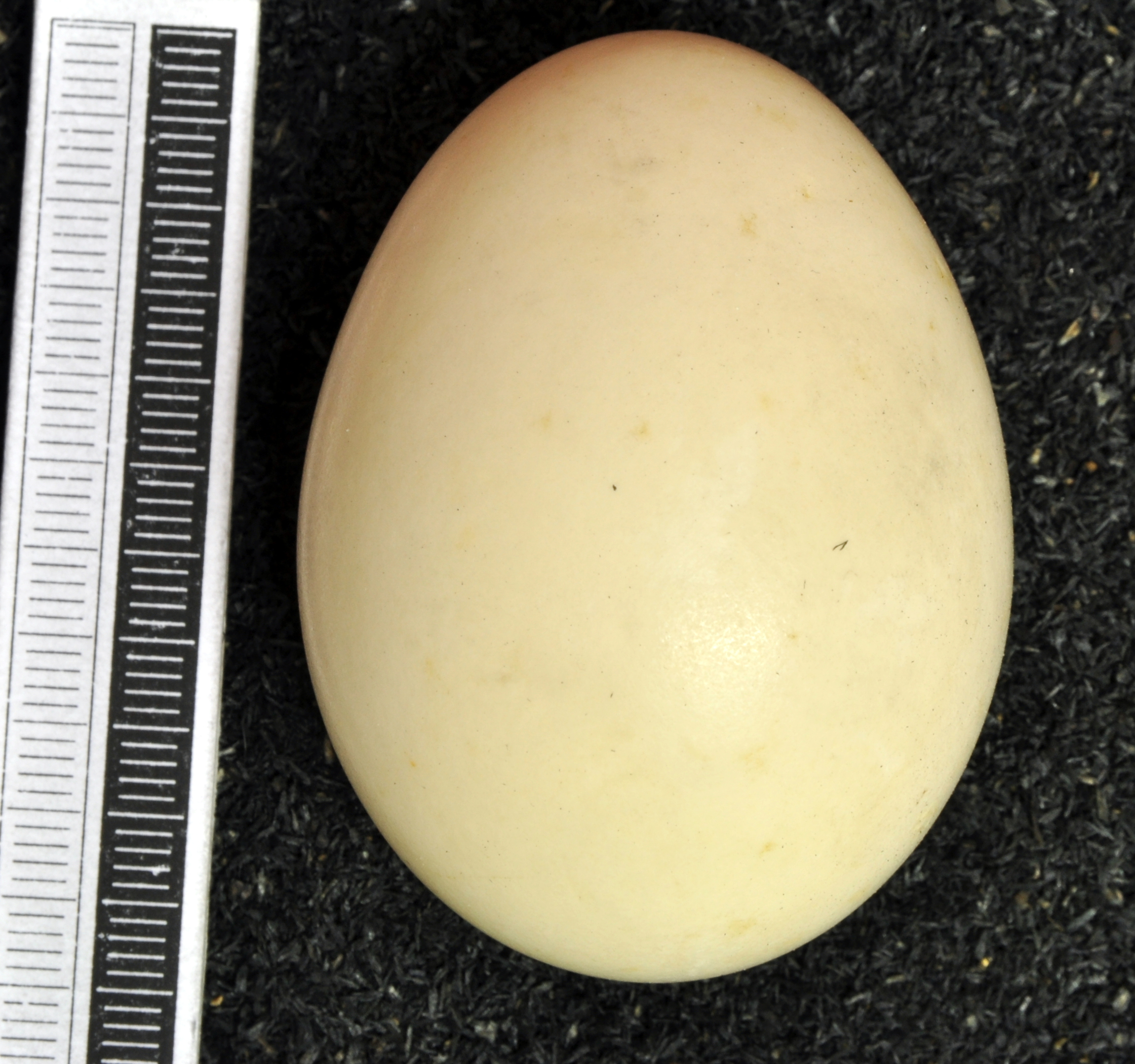
Egg, Collection Museum Wiesbaden

== Distribution ==
It breeds in the northernmost areas of Europe and the Palearctic. It is the Old World counterpart of the North American American wigeon. It is strongly migratory and winters further south than its breeding range. It migrates to southern Asia and Africa. In Great Britain and Ireland, the Eurasian wigeon is common as a winter visitor, but scarce as a breeding bird in Scotland, the Lake District, the Pennines and occasionally further south, with only a handful of breeding pairs in Ireland. It can be found as an uncommon winter visitor in the United States on the mid-Atlantic and Pacific coasts. It is a rare visitor to the rest of the United States except for the Four Corners and the southern Appalachians.

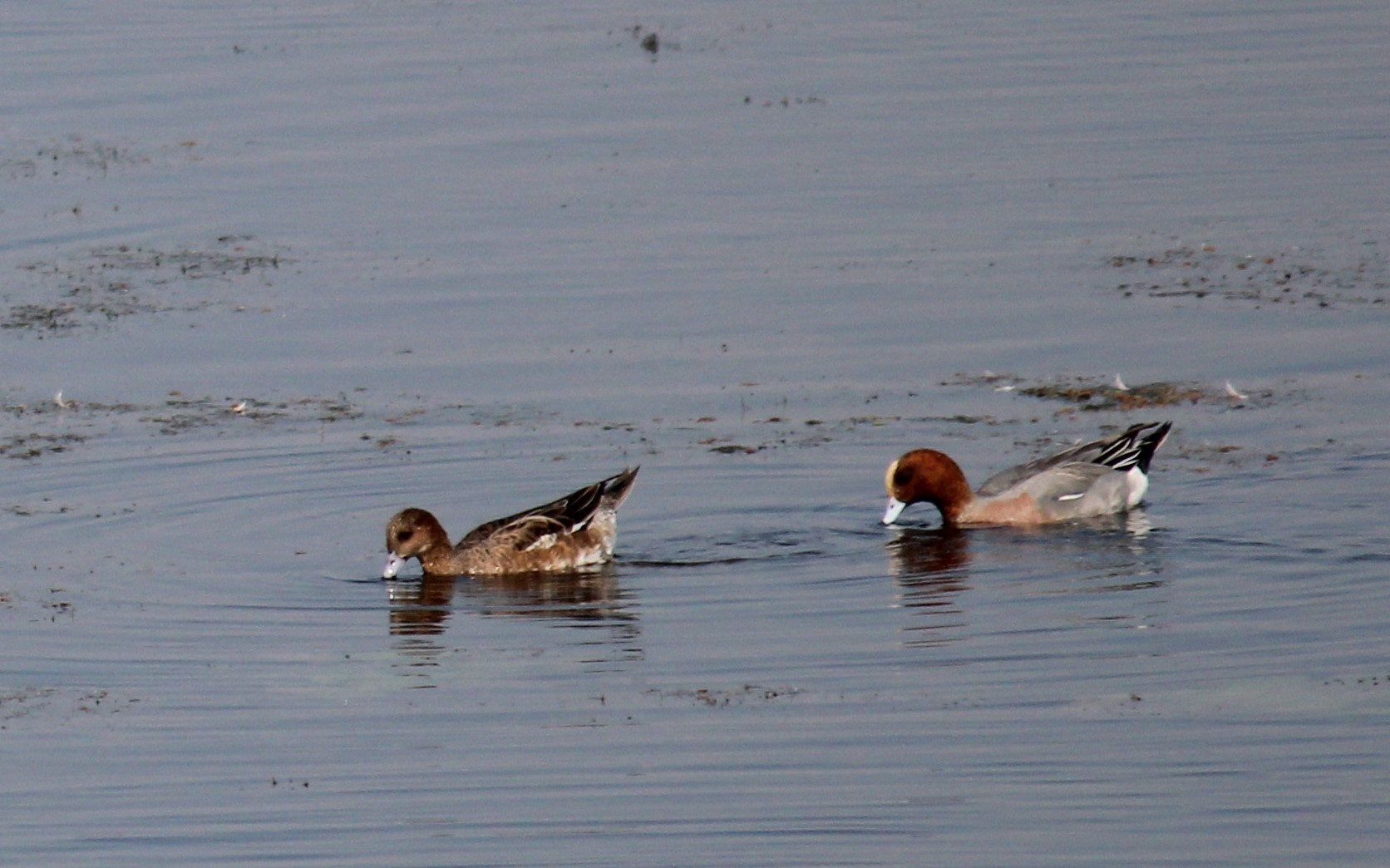
Eurasian wigeon pair at Nandur Madhmeshwar Bird Sanctuary, India

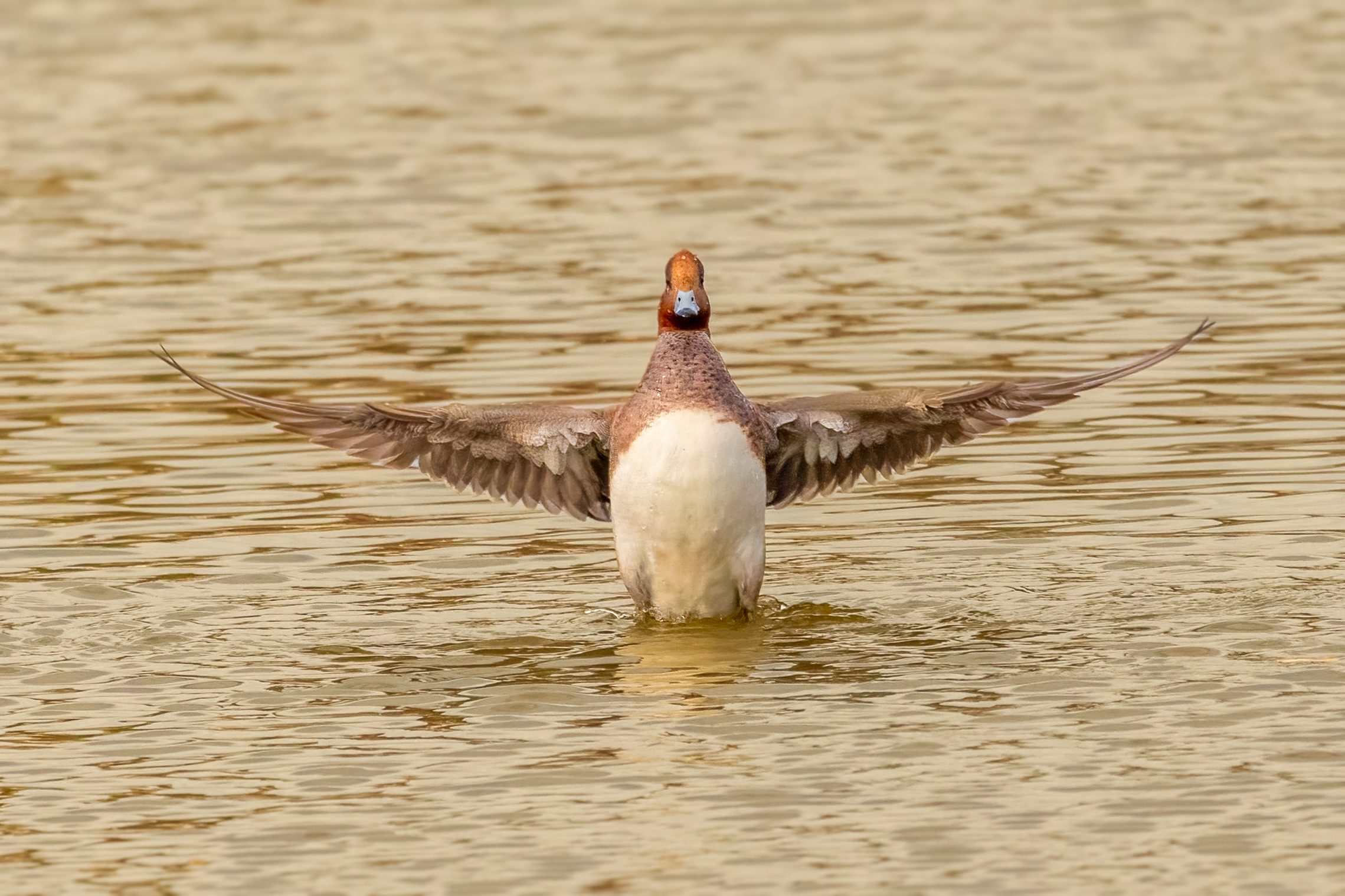
In Nepal

== Behaviour and habitat ==
The Eurasian wigeon is a bird of open wetlands, such as wet grasslands or marshes with some taller vegetation. It usually feeds by dabbling for plant food or grazing, which it does very readily. It nests on the ground, near water and under cover. It is highly gregarious outside of the breeding season and will form large flocks. They will join with flocks of the American wigeon in the United States, and will also hybridize with them. This is a vocal species, with the male producing a distinctive whistle that can be likened to the sound of "pjiew pjiew", while the female has a low growling sound that can be transcribed as "rawr".

The Eurasian wigeon is one of the species to which the Agreement on the Conservation of African-Eurasian Migratory Waterbirds (AEWA) applies. Its conservation status is least concern.
