= Sedgwick County Zoo =

Zoo in Wichita, Kansas, US

- Interactive map of Sedgwick County Zoo
- 37.7158°N 97.4104°W
- Date opened: August 25, 1971; 55 years ago
- Location: Wichita, Kansas, US
- Land area: 247 acres (100 ha)
- No. of animals: 3,000
- No. of species: 400
- Annual visitors: 654,494 (2009)
- Memberships: AZA
- Public transit: Wichita Transit
- Website: scz.org

The Sedgwick County Zoo is an AZA-accredited wildlife park and major attraction in Wichita, Kansas, United States. Founded in 1971, with the help of the Sedgwick County Zoological Society, the zoo has quickly become recognized both nationally and internationally for its support of conservation programs and successful breeding of rare and endangered species. Housing over 3,000 animals of nearly 400 species, it is the 13th largest zoo in the United States in both number of species and total animals, and 7th largest in total area. The zoo has slowly increased its visitors and now ranks as the number one outdoor tourist attraction in the state.

== History ==
Sedgwick County Zoo opened to the public on August 25, 1971 as the result of a public-private partnership between Sedgwick County and the Sedgwick County Zoological Society. The zoo replaced a small, outdated exhibit in Central Riverside Park dating to the turn of the 20th Century. The zoological society formed in 1963 and by 1966 voters approved $3.65 million in bonds to purchase the land that would become Sedgwick County Zoo and Sedgwick County Park. Richard Blakey, director of the Brookfield Zoo, was hired as the zoo's first director.

The zoo originally opened with just two buildings, the American and Asian farms, although other exhibits opened over the next decade. The African Veldt exhibit opened in 1973, the Herpetarium (now Amphibians & Reptiles) opened in 1974, the Jungle (now Tropics) opened in 1977, the Australian Outback and South American Pampas (now Australia/South America) opened in 1980, and the Apes & Man building (now Koch Orangutan and Chimpanzee Habitat) opened in 1982.

Additional major exhibit openings include the North American Prairie (now North America) in 1993, Pride of the Plains in 2000, Downing Gorilla Forest in 2004, Cessna Penguin Cove in 2007, Slawson Family Tiger Trek in 2009 (expanded to Slawson Family Asian Big Cat Trek in 2021), the Reed Family Elephants of the Zambezi River Valley in 2016, and Stingray Cove in 2022. Major non-exhibit updates include the opening of Oliver Animal Hospital in 2000 and the 15,000 square foot Cargill Learning Center in 2006. The zoo currently sits on 247 acres, of which 115 are developed.

== Exhibits ==
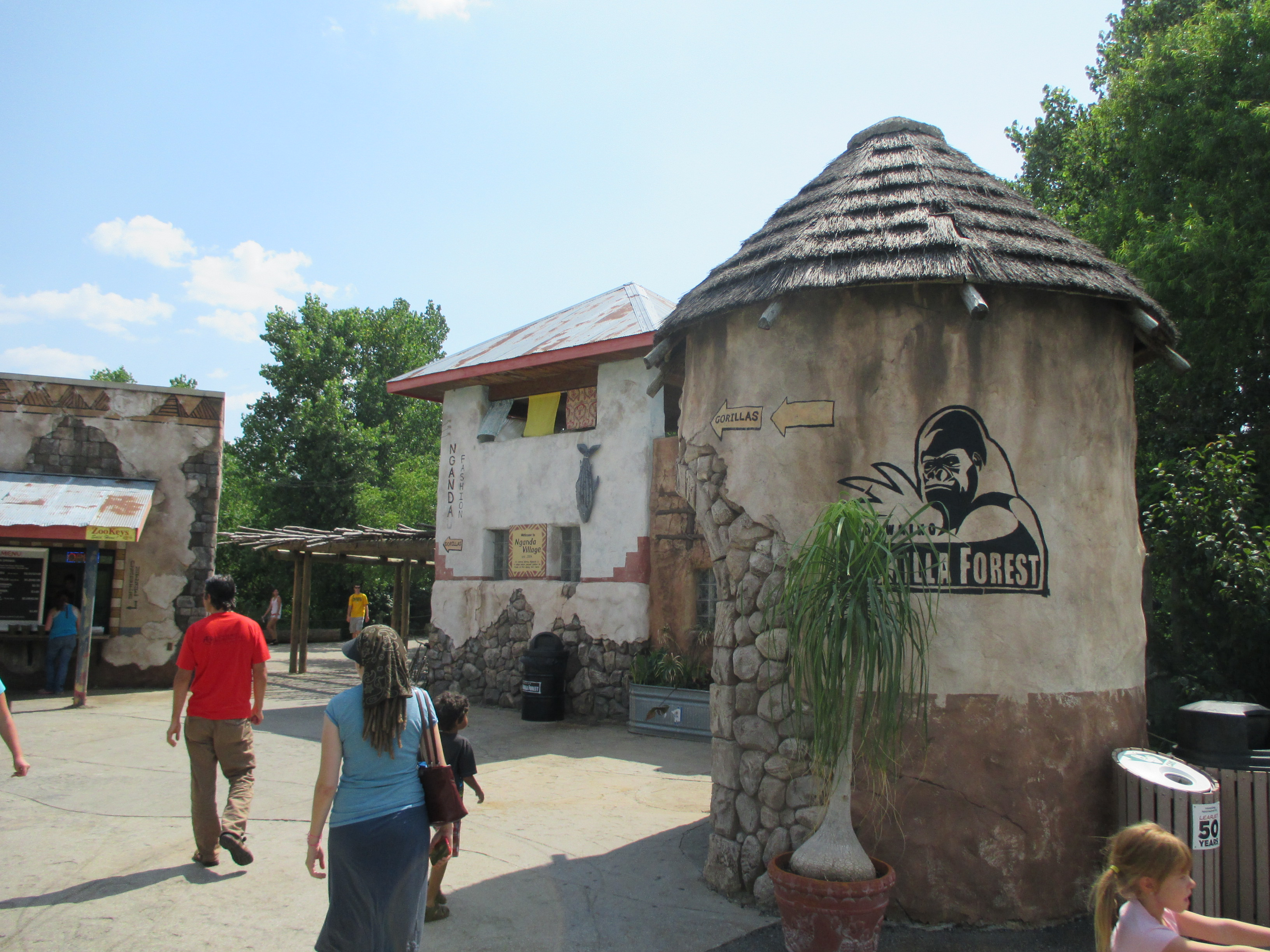
African village-themed area at the entrance to Downing Gorilla Forest

=== Downing Gorilla Forest ===
Opening in 2004, the Downing Gorilla Forest starts out in a recreation of a small Congo village with exhibits for colobus monkeys and white pelicans. Across a bridge is an exhibit for saddle-billed storks, as well as one for black crowned cranes and okapis. The main attraction is a large gorilla exhibit. They can be viewed in their indoor home, outside through large viewing windows or across a moat.

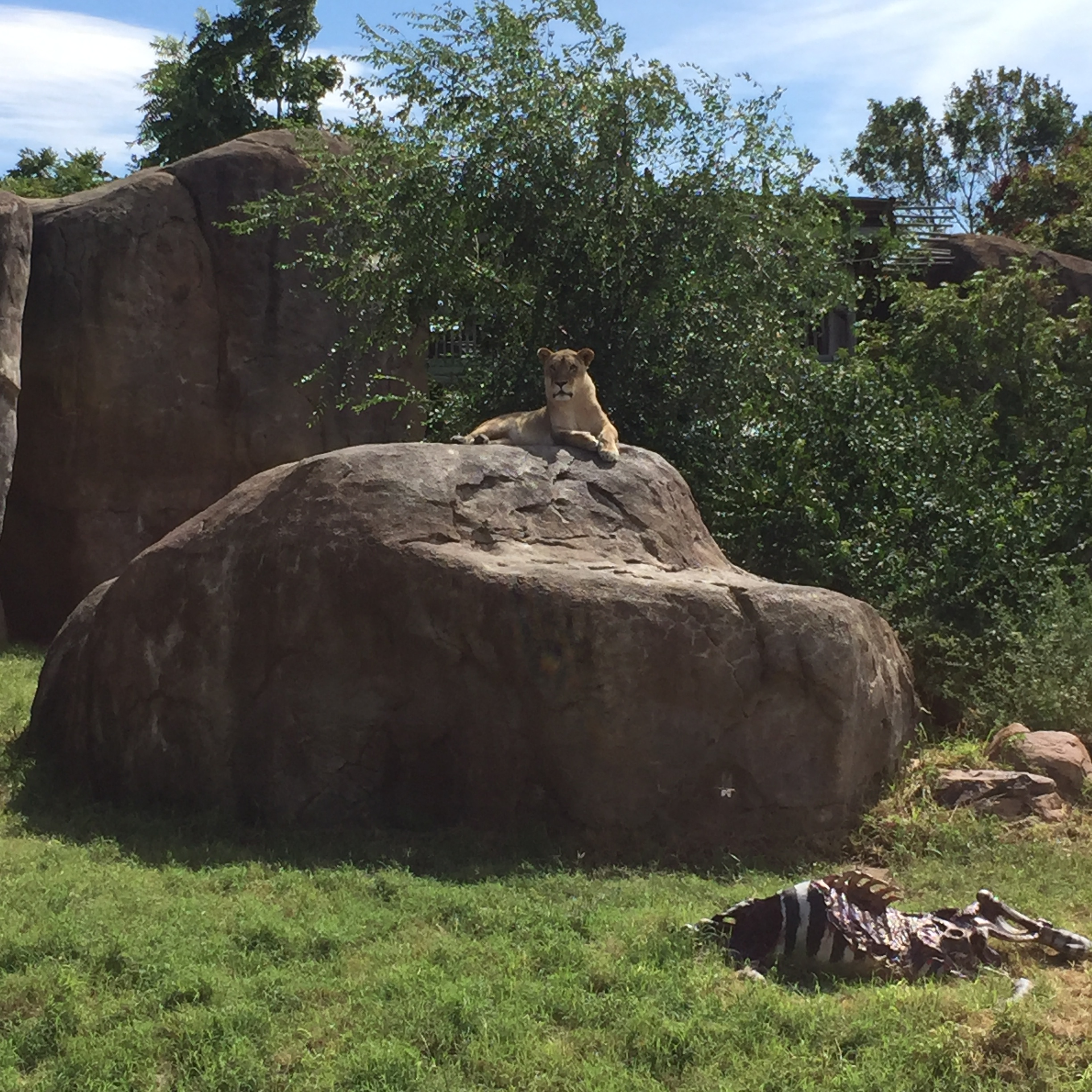
Lioness with (imitated) zebra kill

=== Pride of the Plains ===
Opened May 29, 2000, A path winds around exhibits of lions, red river hogs, and two exhibits of meerkats. Each exhibit has several views from all sides. The whole area has a kopje theme with giant boulders. At the end is an exhibit for African painted dogs.

=== Cessna Penguin Cove ===
Opening in 2007, the Cessna Penguin Cove is the zoo's first marine exhibit, and home to a colony of Humboldt penguins, Inca terns, and grey gulls. The $1.5 million exhibit features a 42,000-US-gallon (159,000 L) pool with rocky areas and coves on each side.

=== African Veldt ===
Opening in 1973, This exhibit as of April 2026 features two Reticulated giraffes, two Grévy's zebras, one black rhinoceros, two Ring-tailed lemurs, Marabou storks, and blue cranes. The zoo kept a pair of Nile hippopotamuses named Pudgie and Sweetie Pie for over 50 years, starting shortly after the inception of the zoo, until their deaths in May 2023 and August 2025 respectively.

=== The Reed Family Elephants of the Zambezi River Valley ===
On March 11, 2016, six African elephants arrived at the zoo from Eswatini's Hlane Royal National Park to survive a drought. Following that, this exhibit opened in May of that year, housing all of the elephants. At over 5 acres in area, it is the third largest elephant exhibit in the United States and includes a 550,000 gallon pool. The pool is separated from a boat canal by an underwater barrier, giving visitors the impression of sharing the water with the elephants.

A male African elephant, Ajani, from Alabama's Birmingham Zoo, joined the six female elephants for breeding purposes in May 2018. In May 2023, Callee was introduced to the herd from Omaha, Nebraska's Henry Doorly Zoo and Aquarium. A few months later, Ajani transferred to the Toledo Zoo to breed with its two female elephants. On March 14, 2025, the zoo's female African Elephant Simunye gave birth to the first elephant calf ever born at the zoo, but unfortunately, the calf was stillborn. The deceased calf was given the name Malaika meaning "angel" in Swahili. On April 10, 2025, another female elephant, Talia, gave birth to the first surviving elephant calf in zoo history. The male calf was named Bomani, meaning "warrior" in Swahili. Xolani, a third elephant, gave birth to a male calf named Kijani on April 14, 2025, and Arusi followed with a female calf named Asali on June 3, and Zuberi rounded out the breeding by giving birth to a female calf named Dakari on August 22, 2025.

=== The Slawson Family Asian Big Cat Trek ===
This $3 million Asian themed naturalistic exhibit opened in 2009 as the Slawson Family Tiger Trek, and housed Amur tigers, Malayan tigers, red pandas, and brow-antlered deer. In 2021, the exhibit was expanded and reopened as the Slawson Family Asian Big Cat Trek, and added amur leopards, snow leopards, and an area where they can be seen above guests' heads.

=== Amphibians & Reptiles ===
Originally known as the Herpetarium when it first opened in 1974, this area is the zoo's reptile house. The front of the building houses and outdoor viewing for Aldabra tortoises, which also have an indoor exhibit. Upon entering, guests are immediately greeted with a large riverbank tank filled with Kansas native turtles and fish, while also including American bullfrogs and gars. Branching hallways lead to many terrariums filled with many reptiles and amphibians, with some major exhibits being the large Chinese alligator tank, two large terrariums for Jamaican iguanas and King cobras, and four more large terrariums for Black mambas, Eastern green mambas, Indochinese spitting cobras, and Gaboon vipers.

=== Tropics ===
The Tropics building is the second oldest indoor rainforest exhibit in the United States and remains one of the largest. The 28,000 square foot building opened in 1977 and includes over 300 species of live plants, approximately 50 species of free-flying birds, and multiple additional species of tropical fishes, reptiles, bats, and invertebrates. The exhibit underwent a $3 million upgrade in 2015 which replaced the roof, allowing for more natural light and consistent humidity, resulting in healthier plants and natural circadian rhythms for the animals.

=== Stingray Cove ===
Stingray Cove opened in April 2022. The exhibit, originally opening as a paid attraction, was housed in a pavilion and featured a large touch tank full of many stingrays and bamboo sharks. This exhibit was open seasonally, being open March through October. In 2025, Stingray Cove became free to enter, while feeding was still paid. November 1, 2026 marked the final day of the attraction's operation, as it closed permanently that day.

=== North America ===
One of the largest sections of the zoo, the 11 acre North America habitat opened in 1993 originally as the North American Prairie. This area is currently home to American bison, elk, black bears, grizzly bears, North American river otters, cougars, black-footed ferrets, Mexican wolves, black-tailed prairie dogs, and many North American birds and reptiles. Sedgwick County Zoo has contributed to the Mexican wolf Species Survival Plan since their arrival at the zoo with the opening of the North America exhibit, and multiple pups born at the zoo have been released into the wild.

=== Australia/South America ===
Originally opened as the Australian Outback and South American Pampas in 1980, these two connected exhibits together form one of the largest walk-through aviaries in the United States. In addition to numerous free-flying birds, Australia features exhibits of emu, southern cassowary, wallaroo, and free-ranging tammar wallabies. Large animals exhibited in South America include capybara, Chacoan peccary, giant anteater, maned wolf, and Galapagos tortoises.

=== KOCH: Koch Orangutan and Chimpanzee Habitat ===
The Koch Orangutan and Chimpanzee Habitat originally opened as Apes & Man in 1982. It featured indoor exhibits for chimpanzees and Sumatran orangutans, while also demonstrating the similarities between great apes and humans. In 1996, the area was expanded, adding outdoor enclosures for the chimpanzees and orangutans with multiple viewing levels. This would become known as KOCH, the Koch Orangutan and Chimpanzee Habitat.

=== Children's Farms ===
When the zoo first opened to the public in 1971, the American Farm and Asian Farm were the only completed exhibits. These were later joined by the African Farm in 1982, and together they are referred to as the Children's Farms. This section of the zoo features more than 40 breeds of domestic animals from all over the world, including many breeds of sheep and goats that visitors are able to feed and pet.

== Rides ==
=== Martha C. Buford Safari Express ===
The Martha C. Buford Safari Express is a C.P. Huntington electric train manufactured by Chance Rides that opened in 2022. Two locomotives, each with four cars and capable of carrying up to 50 visitors, travel on a 1.3 mile track around the zoo. The train stops at two stations: one near the zoo entrance and one near the Downing Gorilla Forest. Much of the path travels behind the scenes of the zoo, including past the pasture for the Children's Farm animals and behind the elephant exhibit.

=== Boat Ride ===
Visitors are able to board a boat ride in the zoo's Africa section that passes an island inhabited by eastern white pelicans, the Downing Gorilla Forest, and much of the North America exhibit before returning to Africa at the Reed Family Elephants of the Zambezi River Valley. An underwater barrier separates the boat ride from the 80-yard long, 550,000 gallon pool in the elephant exhibit, allowing riders to share the water with the elephants.

== List of animals ==
Animals of Sedgwick County Zoo

Entrance

- American flamingo
- Greater flamingo

Children's Farm

- Arapawa goat
- Asiatic water buffalo
- Clydesdale horse
- Domestic yak
- Domestic zebu
- Dromedary camel
- Gloucestershire Old Spot pig
- Guinea hog
- Heritage Shorthorn cow
- Honeybee
- Indian runner duck
- Karakul sheep
- Magpie duck
- Milking Devon cow
- Miniature donkey
- Nankin Bantam chicken
- Navajo-Churro sheep
- Pineywoods cow
- Poitou donkey
- Sebastopol goose
- Silkie Bantam chicken
- Watusi cow
- White Park cow

Cessna Penguin Cove

- Grey gull
- Humboldt penguin
- Inca tern

Amphibians and reptiles

- African green toad
- Aldabra giant tortoise
- Angolan garter snake
- Armenian viper
- Barnett's lancehead
- Indochinese spitting cobra
- Black mamba
- Black-breasted leaf turtle
- Black-spined toad
- Black-tailed horned pitviper
- Blessed poison frog
- Cape coral snake
- Cape twig snake
- Carrot-tail viper gecko
- Chinese alligator
- Chinese crocodile lizard
- Chuckwalla
- Collared tree runner
- Dyeing poison dart frog
- Egyptian tortoise
- Four-eyed turtle
- Gan's egg-eating snake
- Gila monster
- Green keel-bellied lizard
- Eastern green mamba
- Green sunfish
- Jamaican iguana
- Kaup's caecilian
- King cobra
- Kwangtung river turtle
- Levantine viper
- Long-nosed viper
- Longnose gar
- Mandarin rat snake
- Oaxacan knob-scaled lizard
- Okinawa newt
- Pan's box turtle
- Pascagoula map turtle
- Karsten's plated lizard
- Rainbow whiptail
- Razor-backed musk turtle
- River cooter
- Rough-scaled python
- Rubber boa
- Sahara sand viper
- Egyptian saw-scaled viper
- Sonoran desert toad
- Sonoran spiny-tailed iguana
- Spiny softshell turtle
- Spiny-tailed monitor
- Spotted gar
- Spotted turtle
- Tentacled snake
- Three-striped dart frog
- Western gaboon viper
- Yellow pond turtle
- Yellow-blotched map turtle

Tropics

- Asian fairy-bluebird
- Asian forest scorpion
- Australian lungfish
- Baikal teal
- Beautiful fruit dove
- Black crake
- Black-faced dacnis
- Blue-gray tanager
- Boeseman's rainbowfish
- Brazilian salmon birdeater tarantula
- Bruce's green pigeon
- Chestnut-backed thrush
- Chinese hwamei
- Cinereous finch
- Climbing perch
- Collared finch-billed bulbul
- Common bulbul
- Crested coua
- Crested quail-dove
- Crested wood partridge
- Cuban crocodile
- Emerald starling
- Falcated duck
- Fly river turtle
- Giant cave roach
- Giant red tail gourami
- Golden-breasted starling
- Golden-headed quetzal
- Great blue turaco
- Green-naped pheasant pigeon
- Grosbeak starling
- Guam kingfisher
- Luzon's bleeding-heart dove
- Mandarin duck
- Marbled teal
- Mariana fruit dove
- Nicobar pigeon
- North American ruddy duck
- Oriole warbler
- Pink-necked fruit dove
- Plecostomus
- Queensland redclaw yabby
- Red-capped cardinal
- Red-crested turaco
- Red-legged honeycreeper
- Regent parrot
- Sabah thorny stick insect
- Scarlet-faced liocichla
- Silver moony
- Snowy-headed robin-chat
- Spangled cotinga
- Speckled mousebird
- Seven-spot archerfish
- Spotted scat
- Sunbittern
- Sunda parrotfinch
- Victoria crowned pigeon
- Edwards's pheasant
- Violet-backed starling
- White spotted river ray
- White-breasted woodswallow
- Wonga pigeon
- Sunda wrinkled hornbill

Stingray Cove

- Brownbanded bamboo shark
- Cownose stingray
- Southern stingray
- Whitespotted bamboo shark

Africa

African Veldt

- Blue crane
- Eastern black rhinoceros
- Grevy's zebra
- Marabou stork
- Reticulated giraffe
- Ring-tailed lemur

Pride of the Plains

- African lion
- African painted dog
- Red river hog
- Slender-tailed meerkat

The Reed Family Elephants of the Zambezi River Valley

- African elephant

The Downing Gorilla Forest

- Black crowned crane
- Eastern black-and-white colobus
- Eastern white pelican
- Okapi
- Saddle-billed stork
- Western lowland gorilla

Asia

The Slawson Family Asian Big Cat Trek

- Amur leopard
- Amur tiger
- Red panda
- Snow leopard

North America

- American bison
- Elk
- American wigeon
- Arizona ridge-nosed rattlesnake
- Bald eagle
- Banded rock rattlesnake
- Black-footed ferret
- Black-tailed prairie dog
- Cinnamon teal
- Osage copperhead
- Cougar
- Grizzly bear
- Hooded merganser
- Mexican wolf
- North American river otter
- Northern black-tailed rattlesnake
- Northern pintail
- Prairie rattlesnake
- Timber rattlesnake
- White-tailed deer

Australia

- Australian shoveler
- Australian wood duck
- Black swan
- Blue-faced honeyeater
- Eastern rosella
- Eclectus parrot
- Emu
- Freckled duck
- Galah
- Kea
- Laughing kookaburra
- Masked lapwing
- Pale-headed rosella
- Pied imperial pigeon
- Plumed whistling duck
- Radjah shelduck
- Salmon-crested cockatoo
- Southern cassowary
- Straw-necked ibis
- Tammar wallaby
- Tawny frogmouth
- Wallaroo

South America

- Argentine ruddy duck
- Blue-and-yellow macaw
- Blue-billed curassow
- Blue-crowned motmot
- Blue-headed pionus
- Blue-throated macaw
- Boat-billed heron
- Buffon's macaw
- Capybara
- Chacoan peccary
- Chiloé wigeon
- Guianan squirrel monkey
- Coscoroba swan
- Giant anteater
- Golden conure
- Green aracari
- Green iguana
- Green-winged macaw
- Hyacinth macaw
- King vulture
- Maned wolf
- Peruvian thick-knee
- Puna ibis
- Puna teal
- Red shoveler
- Red-footed tortoise
- Red-fronted macaw
- Red-legged seriema
- Roseate spoonbill
- Scarlet macaw
- Southern pudu
- Southern screamer
- Spectacled owl
- Sun conure
- Thick-billed parrot
- Umbrella cockatoo
- Venezuelan troupial
- Galápagos tortoise
- White-cheeked pintail
- White-faced whistling duck
- White-nosed coati
- Wood stork
- Yellow-collared macaw
- Yellow-footed tortoise
- Yellow-headed amazon
- Yellow-naped amazon

KOCH Orangutan and Chimpanzee Habitat

- Chimpanzee
- Sumatran orangutan

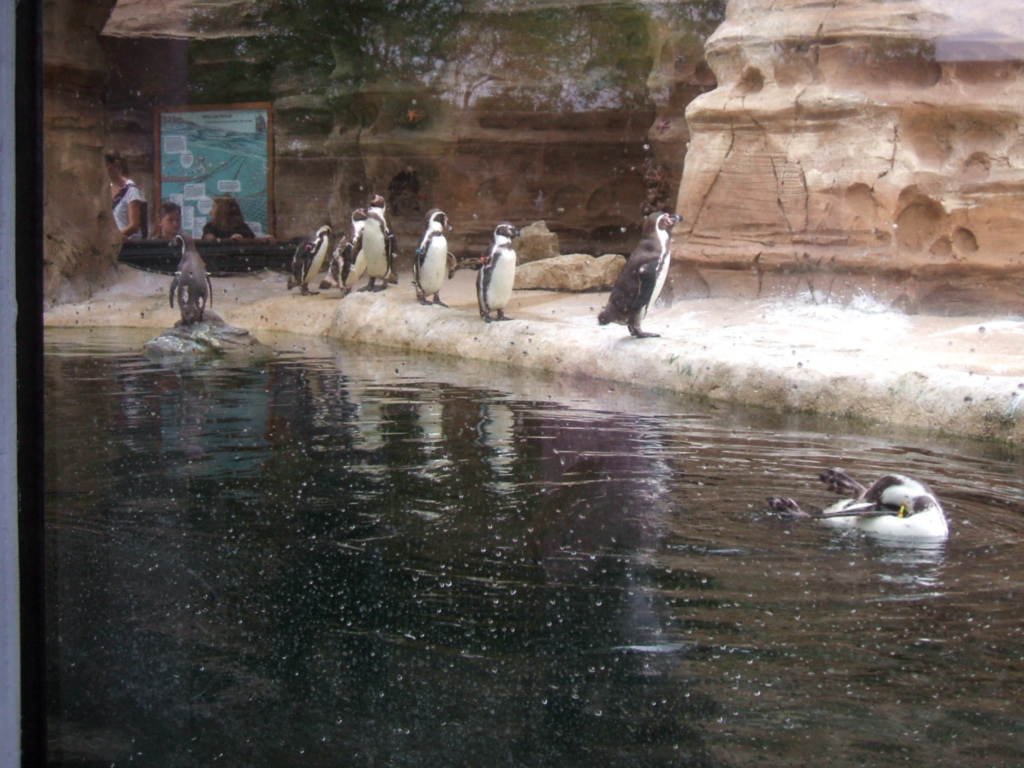
Cessna Penguin Cove

== Future ==
A new entrance for the zoo opened on May 27, 2021 which, along with the completion of the Slawson Family Asian Big Cat Trek and an electric train route around the zoo, completed Phase 1 of the 25-year master plan. On April 16, 2022, the zoo opened a now closed shark and stingray touch-tank exhibit. As of October 2024, the zoo is fundraising to expand the indoor elephant habitat to meet the needs of the growing herd. Future phases of the master plan call for an expansion of the Amphibians & Reptiles complex to include an aquarium featuring a 55,000-gallon shark tank. Plans are also in place for an onsite, 200–300 room "African lodge" style hotel overlooking a mixed-species African savanna exhibit. The lodge and an indoor water park would be built on 40 acres of currently undeveloped land at the back of the zoo.

== Incidents ==
- In June 2005, two flamingos escaped from the zoo during a stormy night. Since then, one of the flamingos, identified as No. 492, has been spotted in Wisconsin, Louisiana, and Texas.
- In 2008, a female Komodo dragon at the zoo hatched two offspring via parthenogenesis. The female and another female had been at the zoo since 1993 and had not had any contact with a male during that time. This marked the first parthenogenetic reproduction by a Komodo dragon in a North American zoo, and only the third documented occurrence after hatchings at the London Zoo and Chester Zoo in 2006.
- On May 6, 2011, a first-grade student on a class field trip climbed over a four-foot fence then crossed the eight-foot gap of the Amur leopard exhibit. The boy was attacked. He suffered lacerations and puncture wounds to his head and neck before a bystander kicked the leopard in the head. The injuries were not considered life-threatening, and the zoo did not euthanize the endangered animal.
