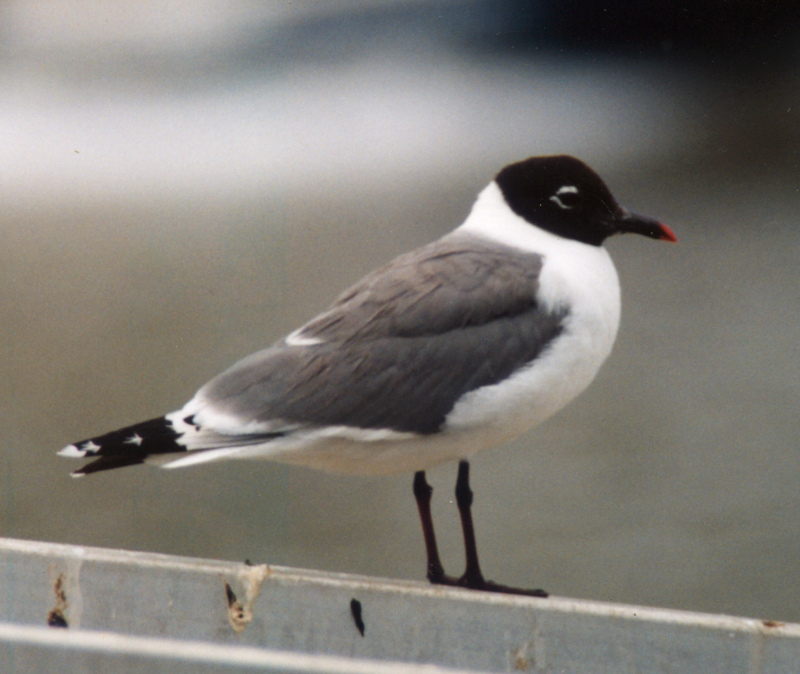
- Franklin's gull

Scientific classification
- Kingdom: Animalia
- Phylum: Chordata
- Class: Aves
- Order: Charadriiformes
- Family: Laridae
- Genus: Leucophaeus; Bruch, 1855

Type species
- Larus haematorhynchus King, 1828

Species
- 5, see list

= Leucophaeus =

Genus of birds

Leucophaeus is a small genus of medium-sized New World gulls, most of which are dark in plumage, usually with white crescents above and below the eyes. They were placed in the genus Larus until recently. The genus name Leucophaeus is from Ancient Greek leukos, "white", and phaios, "dusky".

== Species ==
Genus Leucophaeus – Bruch, 1855 – five species
Common name	Scientific name and subspecies	Range	Size and ecology	IUCN status and estimated population
Dolphin gull	Leucophaeus scoresbii (Traill, 1823)	coasts of Chile, Argentina, and the Falkland Islands	Size: Habitat: Diet:	LC
Grey gull	Leucophaeus modestus (Tschudi, 1843)	Costa Rica, Colombia, Ecuador, Peru, and Chile,	Size: Habitat: Diet:	LC
Lava gull	Leucophaeus fuliginosus (Gould, 1841)	Galapagos Islands	Size: Habitat: Diet:	VU
Laughing gull	Leucophaeus atricilla (Linnaeus, 1758) Two subspecies: L. a. megalopterus (Bruch, 1855); L. a. atricilla (Linnaeus, 1758)	the Atlantic coast of North America, the Caribbean, and northern South America	Size: Habitat: Diet:	LC
Franklin's gull	Leucophaeus pipixcan (Wagler, 1831)	Argentina, the Caribbean, Chile, Peru, and Canada	Size: Habitat: Diet:	LC
