= Pink Floyd (flamingo) =

Escaped Zoo animal (hatched circa 2000)

- Species: Greater flamingo
- Sex: Unknown
- Hatched: c. 1999–2001; Tanzania
- Known for: Escape from the Sedgwick County Zoo
- Residence: Texas

Pink Floyd (born c. 1999–2001), also known as No. 492, is a greater flamingo who, in 2005, escaped its enclosure at the Sedgwick County Zoo, in Kansas. Another flamingo also escaped with it. Although the other flamingo was last seen in Michigan in August 2005, Pink Floyd was continually spotted around the United States as late as 2023. Zoo officials have no plans to recapture the bird.

== Background ==
External image
- Pink Floyd as seen in a 2018 photograph published by the Texas Parks and Wildlife Department

Pink Floyd was one of 39 flamingos hatched in Tanzania before being brought to the Sedgwick County Zoo in 2003. The most recent flamingo enclosure opened in May 2004 alongside the newly constructed gorilla exhibit. Upon arriving, it was tagged with a yellow band with the number 492 printed on it. Pink Floyd's sex is not known because no DNA test was ever performed on the bird. When captive flamingos are born, a part of each wing can be amputated to prevent them from escaping. This must be done before the bone is formed so that they do not feel pain. Because Pink Floyd was two or three years old when it arrived in Kansas, zoo officials decided that it would no longer be ethical to amputate its wings. Instead, zoo officials decided to clip their feathers annually, an option they considered more humane. However, by June 2005, Pink Floyd and one other flamingo's feathers had not been clipped for some time because zookeepers assumed that the feathers were not yet fully grown.

== Initial escape ==
On June 27, 2005, one of the zoo's 40 greater flamingos was able to fly out of its exhibit. Fearing that it would fly away, zoo staffers did not initially attempt to recapture the flamingo. A second flamingo joined it later that night. The two flamingos repeatedly circled the zoo, but then flew southwest after being disturbed by wind and traffic. At first, zoo staffers chased the two flamingos with vehicles. However, the search was called off after it became too dark to continue.

On June 29, the two birds were seen at a nearby waterway. Again, zoo staffers were unsure of how to capture them, so they checked on them periodically while brainstorming a plan to recapture them. The two remained at that location until a storm scared them away on July 3.

While this was ongoing, members of the general public were calling the zoo suggesting various ways to capture the two flamingos. Some members of the public suggested shooting them with tranquilizer guns. The zoo's marketing manager dismissed this suggestion, noting that tranquilizer darts pose a risk of injury or death to birds. Others suggested using nets. This technique is regularly used on wild turkeys, but zoo officials were also dismissive of this because flamingos fly much higher than wild turkeys. Other suggestions included sneaking up on them, or blinding them with a flashlight. However, zoo officials were also dismissive of these suggestions because flamingos are known to flee human activity at very long distances. The zoo eventually gave up on trying to recapture the two.

== Subsequent sightings ==
Confirmed sightings of Pink Floyd

One of the two flamingos, tagged with a yellow band with the number 347 printed on it, was seen and photographed in Au Train Lake near Marquette, Michigan, in August 2005. It was never seen again after that, presumably because it died the following winter. The other flamingo, with the number 492 printed on its yellow band, flew south, where it was regularly seen over the years. It received the nickname "Pink Floyd".

In 2006, Pink Floyd was spotted at the Aransas National Wildlife Refuge near Seadrift, Texas. It was accompanied by a wild Caribbean flamingo tagged with a band reading "HDNT". This flamingo likely fled Mexico during the 2005 Atlantic Hurricane season. Pink Floyd and its companion would be seen throughout the United States for the next several years.

In 2007, the two were spotted in the Calcasieu Ship Channel in southwestern Louisiana. A group of ornithologists attempted to study them, but the two birds left before they could arrive.

In 2013, a bird-watcher from Massachusetts saw the two birds basking off the coast of Texas. By this point, it was still uncertain as to whether the flamingos were a couple, or merely friends.

In May 2018, an intern with the Texas Parks and Wildlife Department spotted Pink Floyd in Lavaca Bay, in between Houston and Corpus Christi. This time, Pink Floyd was not seen with its longtime companion. The companion was also never seen in any subsequent sightings.

In March 2022, Pink Floyd was filmed by an environmental activist near Port Lavaca, Texas.

The last confirmed sighting of Pink Floyd was in May 2023, where it was photographed in a marshy area by members of Audubon Texas conducting their Texas Annual Waterbird Survey. A photographer from Corpus Christi claimed to have seen Pink Floyd in May 2024, but none of the pictures he allegedly took of it showed his yellow band, preventing the sighting from being confirmed.
