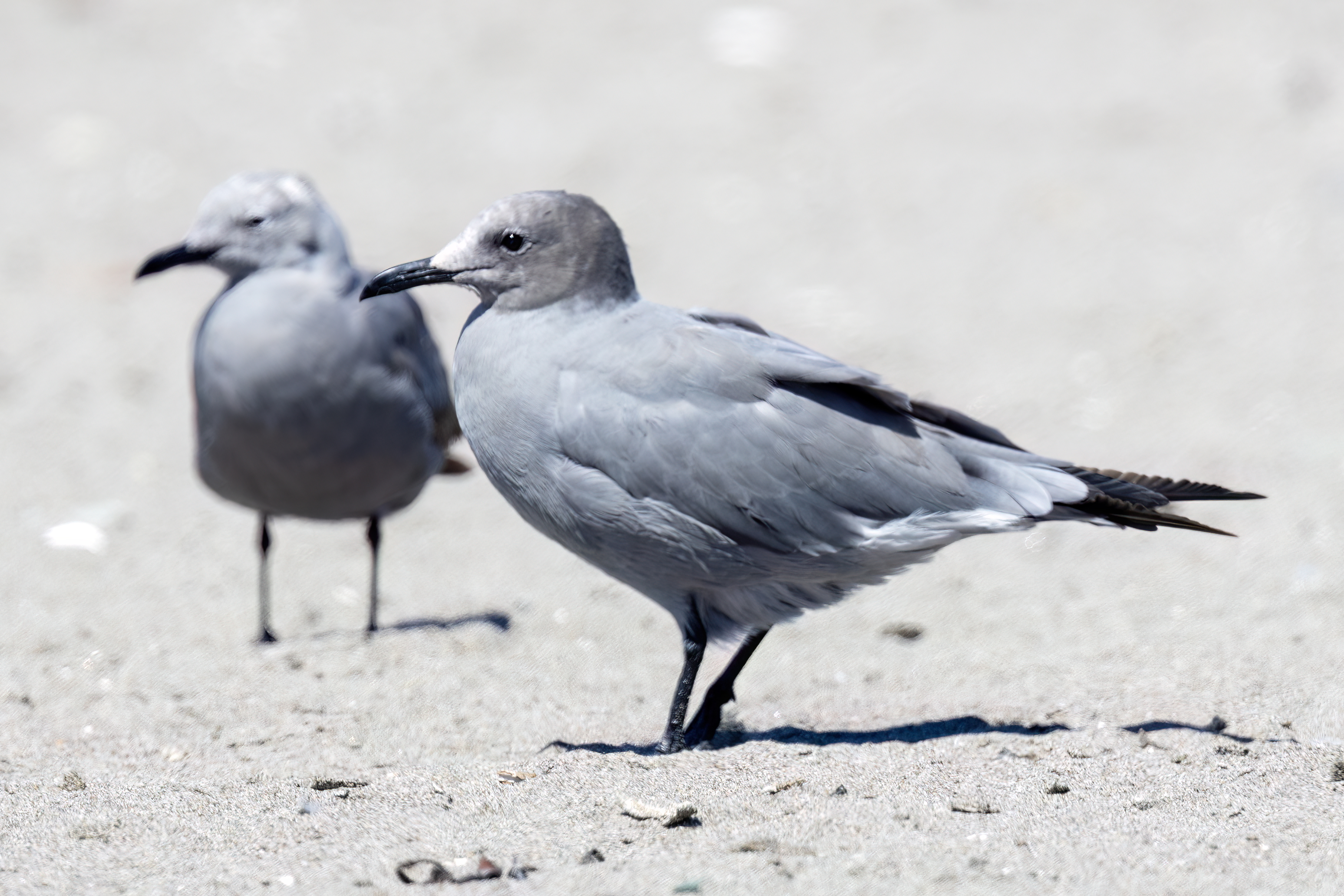
- Grey gull in La Serena, Chile
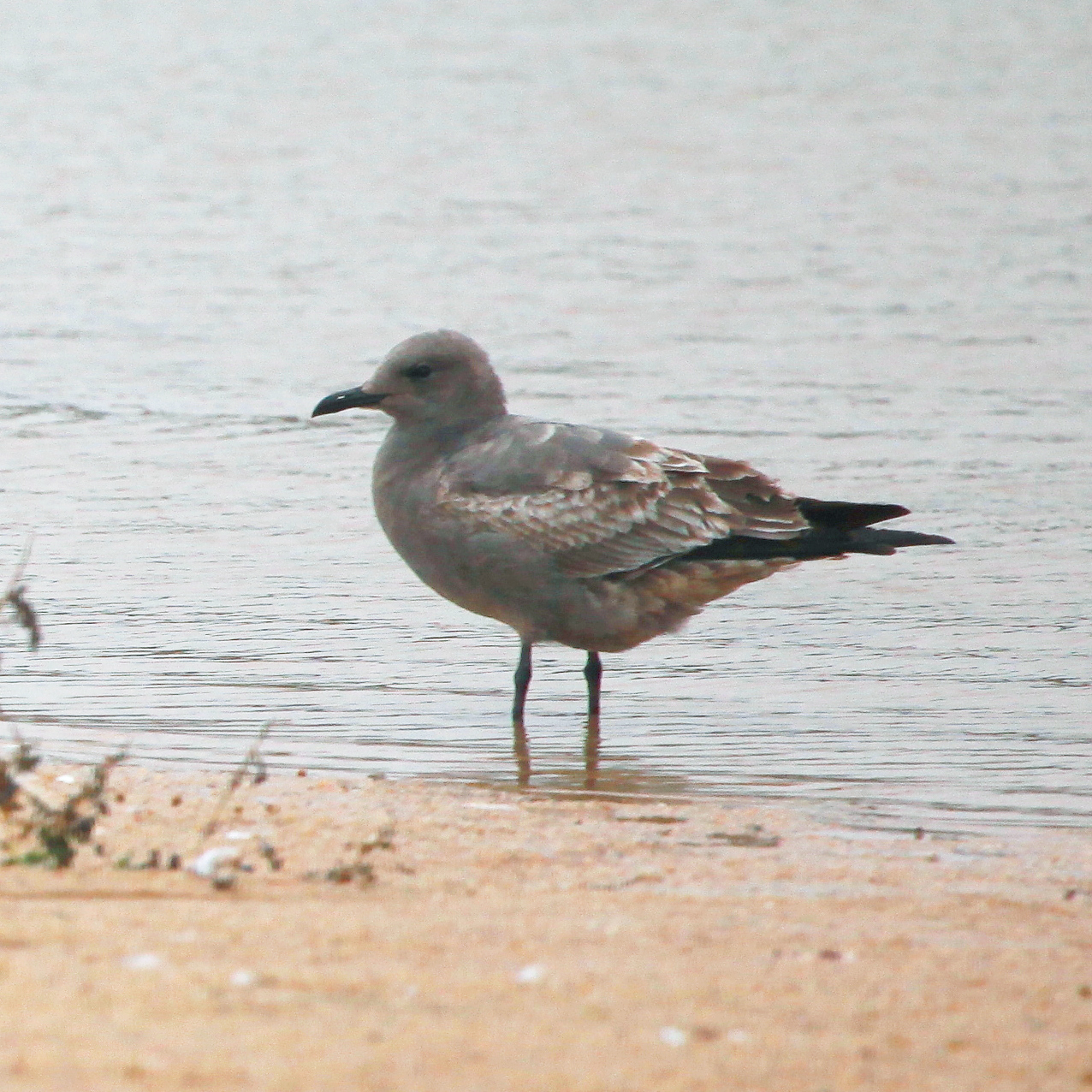
- A young grey gull at Algarrobo, Valparaíso Region, Chile

Conservation status
- Least Concern (IUCN 3.1)

Scientific classification
- Kingdom: Animalia
- Phylum: Chordata
- Class: Aves
- Order: Charadriiformes
- Family: Laridae
- Genus: Leucophaeus
- Species: L. modestus

Binomial name
- Leucophaeus modestus (Tschudi, 1843)

Synonyms
- Larus modestus

= Grey gull =

Species of bird

The grey gull, also known as garuma gull (Leucophaeus modestus), is a medium-sized gull native to South America. Unusual among gulls, it breeds inland in the extremely dry Atacama Desert in northern Chile, although it is present as a non-breeding bird along much of the Pacific coast of South America.

== Description ==
The sexes are similar in grey gulls. Adults grow to a length of about 45 cm (18 in) and weigh some 360 to 400 g (13 to 14 oz). The head is white in summer but brownish-grey in winter. The body and wings are grey with the dorsal surface rather darker than the ventral region. The flight feathers are black and the inner primaries and the secondaries have white tips, visible in flight. The tail has a band of black with a white trailing edge. The legs and beak are black and the iris is brown. The call is similar to that of the laughing gull (Leucophaeus atricilla).

== Distribution ==
The grey gull breeds inland in the Atacama Desert in northern Chile. Its non-breeding range includes Costa Rica, Colombia, Ecuador, Peru and Chile, and it has been recorded in the Falkland Islands, South Georgia and the South Sandwich Islands. It is a vagrant to Panama and Florida; an earlier report of it in Louisiana, from 1987, has not been accepted by a birdwatching authority.

== Behaviour ==
=== Breeding ===
For many years, it was a mystery as to where this bird breeds because no coastal colonies had been identified. However, in 1945, it was discovered that it bred in the Atacama Desert in the interior of Chile. This hot and arid environment has few predators and may be relatively safe for the breeding gulls. The site chosen for the nest, a scrape in the sand and often near rocks, is a waterless region some 35 to 100 km (22 to 62 mi) from the coast. Once the eggs hatch, the parents take it in turn to make the round trip to the sea to bring food and water to their offspring.

The humidity, wind speed, air and surface temperatures vary widely on a daily basis and the gull has to use various thermo-regulatory mechanisms when nesting to maintain its body temperature and that of its eggs and chicks within acceptable limits. In the hottest part of the day the parent bird stands over its nest to prevent the eggs or chicks overheating. Its chief predator is the turkey vulture (Cathartes aura) and when threatened, the incubating parent sometimes leaves the nest temporarily, and when this happens the eggs need to have impervious shells in order to avoid losing too much water through evaporation. In fact, the evaporative loss from the eggs is found to be about one third of that which occurs in Heermann's gull (Larus heermanni), another desert nesting species.

=== Feeding ===
The typical habitat of the grey gull is sandy beaches and mudflats along the western coasts of South America where it probes with its beak in the sediment for invertebrate prey, particularly mole crabs. It also eats fish and ragworms, scavenges for offal and sometimes follows fishing boats.

== Status ==
The grey gull has a restricted inland breeding range and a limited wintering range along the coasts of Ecuador, Peru and Chile. The population trend is believed to be downwards. However, the total number of birds is sufficiently large to justify listing the grey gull as being of "least concern" rather than including it in a more threatened category.
