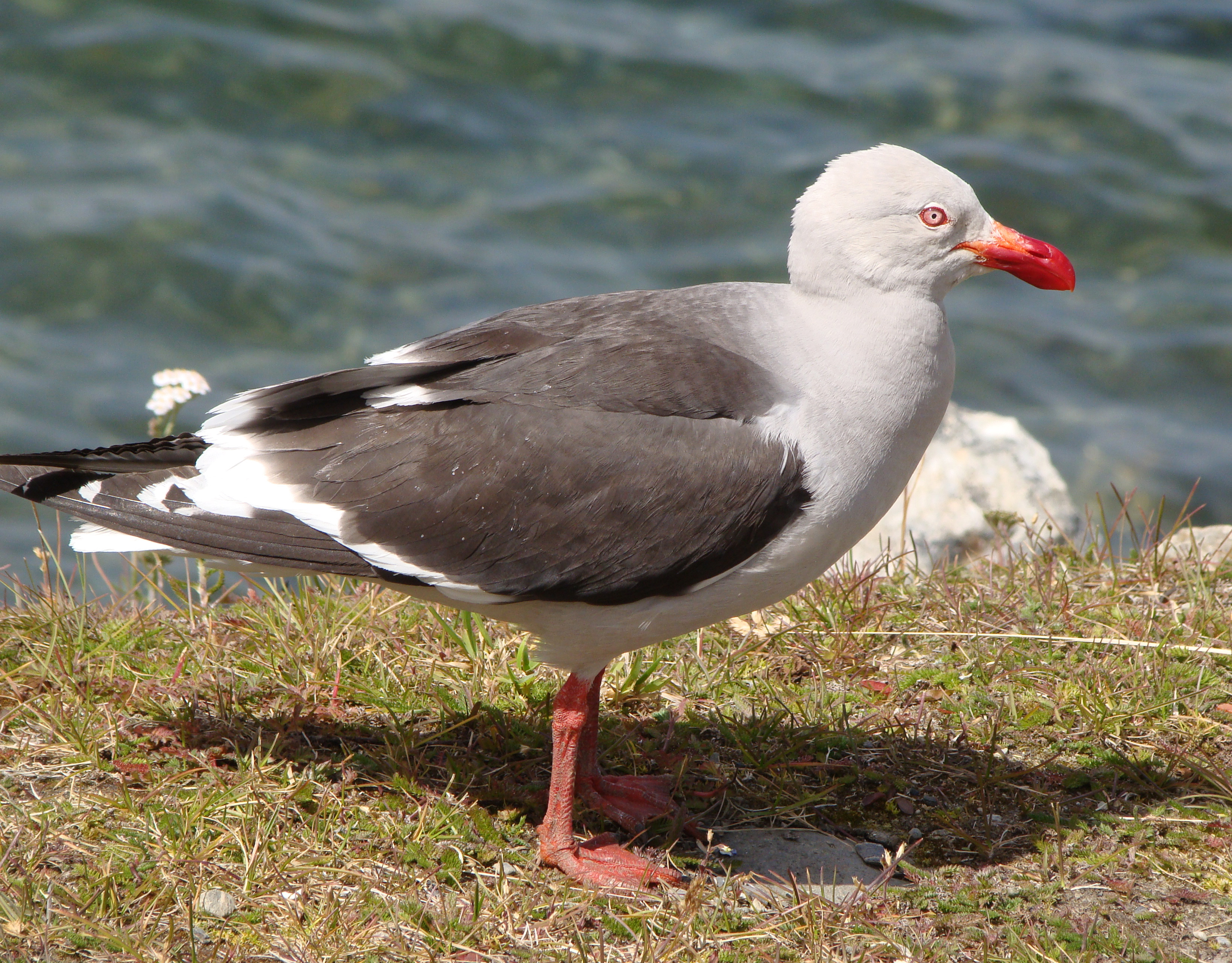
- In Beagle Channel, Argentina

Conservation status
- Least Concern (IUCN 3.1)

Scientific classification
- Kingdom: Animalia
- Phylum: Chordata
- Class: Aves
- Order: Charadriiformes
- Family: Laridae
- Genus: Leucophaeus
- Species: L. scoresbii

Binomial name
- Leucophaeus scoresbii (Traill, 1823)

Synonyms
- Larus scoresbii, Gabianus scoresbii

= Dolphin gull =

Species of bird

The dolphin gull (Leucophaeus scoresbii), sometimes erroneously called the red-billed gull (a somewhat similar but unrelated species from New Zealand), is a gull native to southern Chile and Argentina, and the Falkland Islands. It is a coastal bird inhabiting rocky, muddy and sandy shores and is often found around seabird colonies. They have greyish feathers, and the feathers on their wings are a darker shade. Dolphin gulls have a varied diet, eating many things ranging from mussels to carrion.

The modern scientific name Leucophaeus scoresbii, together with the obsolete common name Scoresby's gull, commemorates the English explorer William Scoresby (1789–1857).

== Distribution ==
The dolphin gull is found round the coasts of Chile, Argentina and the Falkland Islands. It is a vagrant to South Georgia and the South Sandwich Islands. It is found on rocky coasts and in the vicinity of other colonies of seabirds, slaughterhouses, sewage outflows and farmyards.

== Behaviour ==
The dolphin gull is a scavenger and opportunistic predator. It feeds on carrion, offal, bird eggs, nestlings, marine invertebrates and other natural food. When humans disturb nesting seabirds, it takes advantage of the absence of adult birds to raid their vacated nests. It was found that excluding humans from areas where cormorants were nesting increased the reproductive success of the cormorants. It also takes advantage of the activities of marine mammals to scavenge for dead fish, placentae and faeces, which are a major attraction.

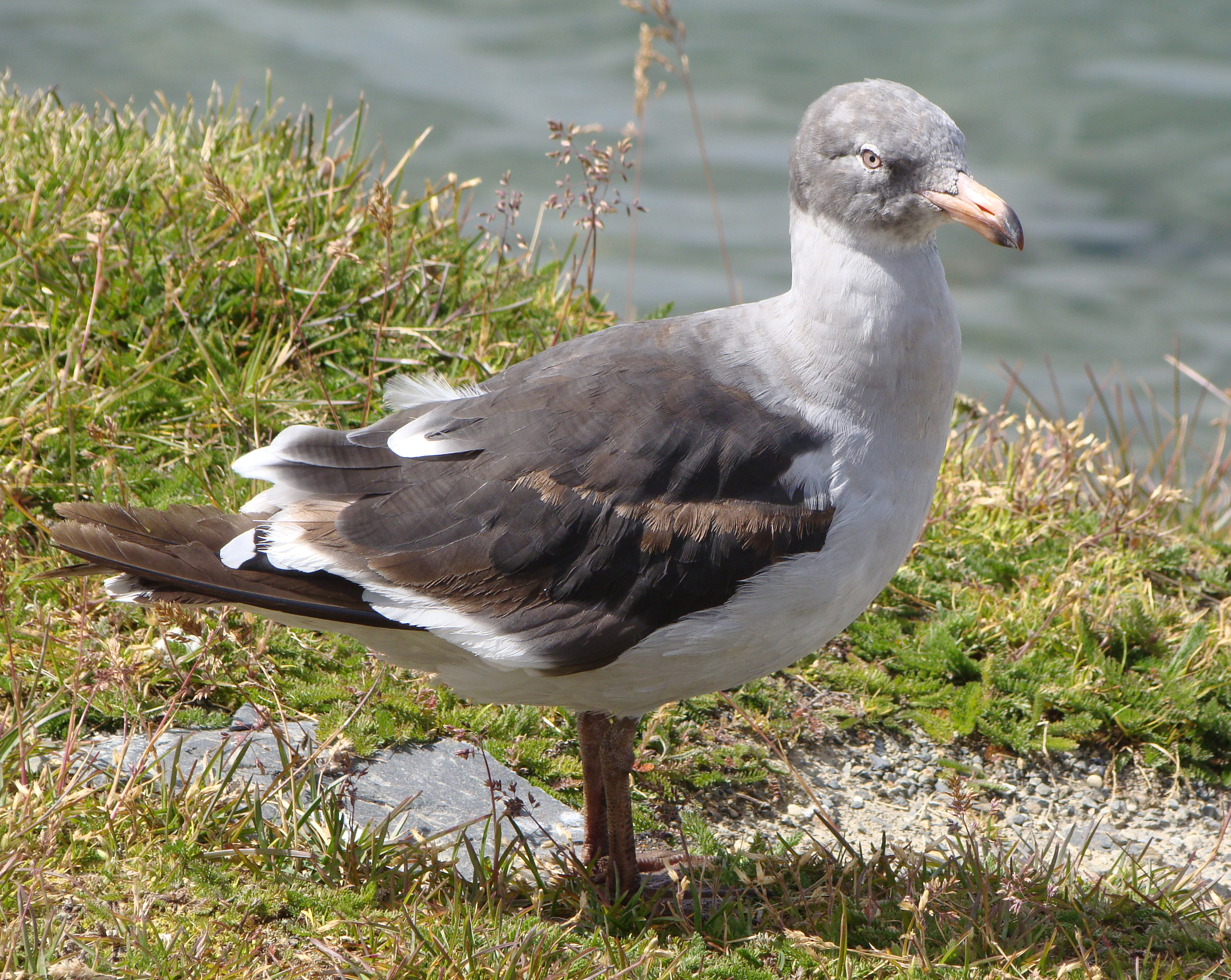
Immature

Dolphin gulls nest in small colonies of up to 200 pairs and are usually on low cliffs, sand or shingle beaches, headlands or marshy depressions. Two to three eggs are laid in December and the chicks fledge in March. The older chicks gather together in crèches.

== Status ==
The dolphin gull is listed by the IUCN as being of "Least Concern". This is because it has a very wide range, has a stable population and an estimated total population of 10,000 to 28,000 individuals.
