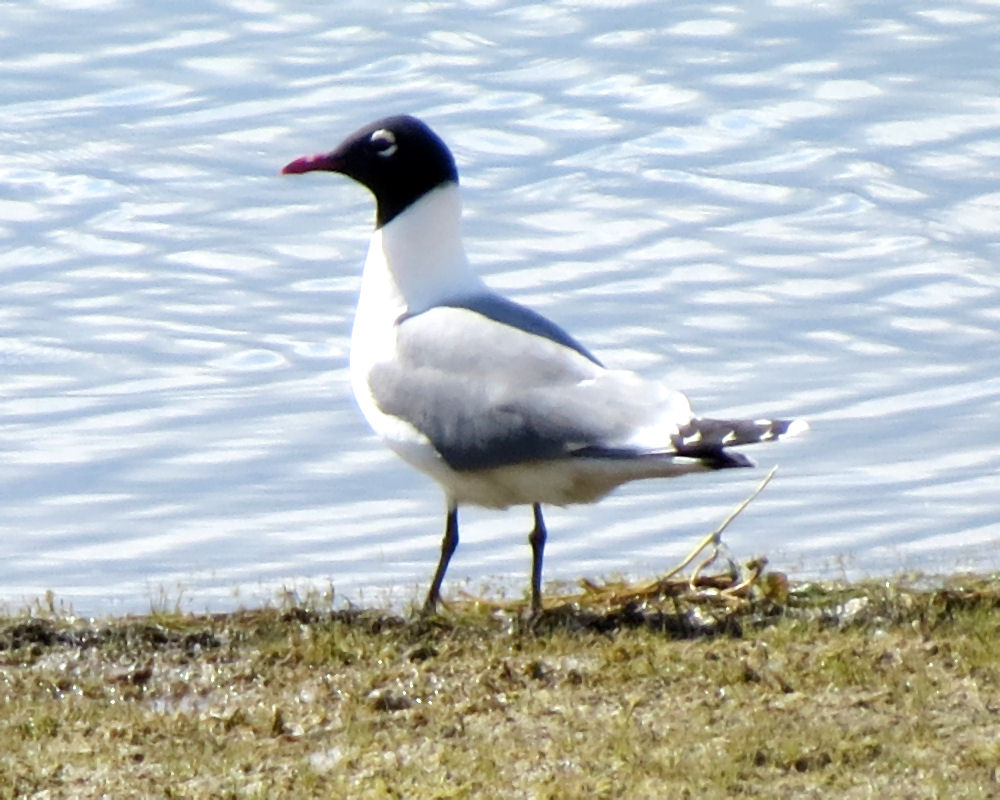
- Adult in breeding plumage
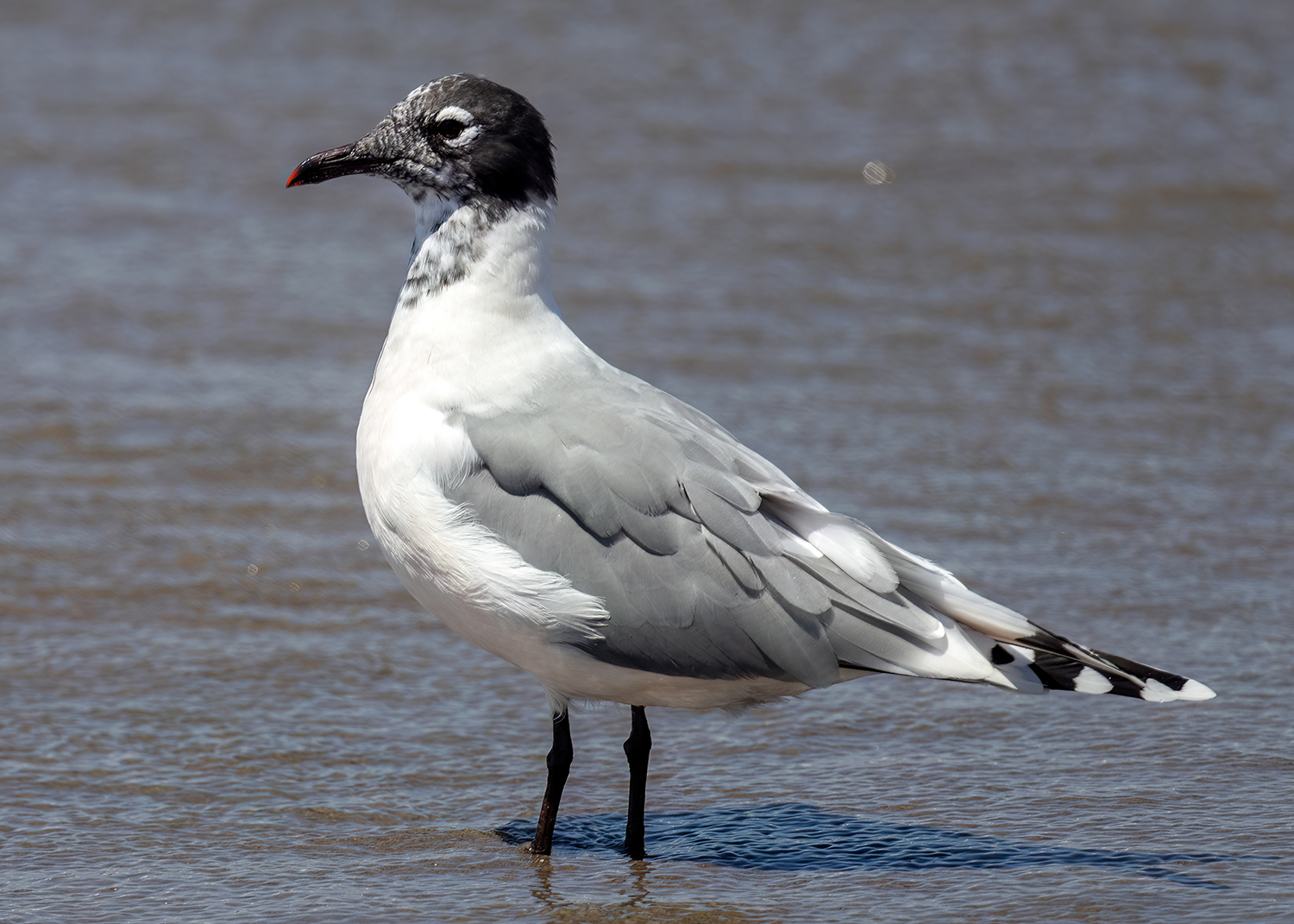
- Adult in nonbreeding plumage

Conservation status
- Least Concern (IUCN 3.1)

Scientific classification
- Kingdom: Animalia
- Phylum: Chordata
- Class: Aves
- Order: Charadriiformes
- Family: Laridae
- Genus: Leucophaeus
- Species: L. pipixcan

Binomial name
- Leucophaeus pipixcan (Wagler, 1831)
- Breeding Migration Nonbreeding

Synonyms
- Larus pipixcan

= Franklin's gull =

Species of bird

Franklin's gull (Leucophaeus pipixcan) is a small (length 12.6–14.2 in, 32–36 cm) gull. The genus name Leucophaeus is from Ancient Greek leukos, "white", and phaios, "dusky". The specific pipixcan is a Nahuatl name for a type of gull. The English common name was given to commemorate the arctic explorer Sir John Franklin, who led an expedition in 1825 on which the type was collected.

== Description ==
It breeds in central provinces of Canada and adjacent states of the northern United States. It is a migratory bird, wintering in Argentina, the Caribbean, Chile, and Peru.

The summer adult's body is white and its back and wings are much darker grey than all other gulls of similar size except the larger laughing gull. The wings have black tips with an adjacent white band. The bill and legs are red. The black hood of the breeding adult is mostly lost in winter.

Young birds are similar to the adult but have less developed hoods and lack the white wing band. They take three years to reach maturity.

Measurements:

- Length: 12.6–14.2 in (32–36 cm)
- Weight: 8.1–10.6 oz (230–300 g)
- Wingspan: 33.5–37.4 in (85–95 cm)

== Distribution ==
Although the bird is uncommon on the coasts of North America, it occurs as a rare vagrant to northwest Europe, south and west Africa, Australia and Japan, with a single record from Eilat, Israel, in 2011 (Smith 2011), and a single record from Larnaca, Cyprus, July 2006. At the beginning of 2017 has been observed also in Southern Romania, southeast Europe.

== Behaviour ==
They are omnivores like most gulls, and they will scavenge as well as seeking suitable small prey. In the spring, on rivers such as the Bow River large groups will float with the current, sipping the emerging insect hatch. The behaviour includes floating through a particular stretch and returning repeatedly to the same section. In the breeding season, they will feed aerially on swarming insects as well as foraging for terrestrial and aquatic insects.

=== Reproduction ===
The birds breed in colonies near prairie lakes with the nest constructed on the ground, or sometimes floating. The two or three eggs are incubated for about three weeks.

== Naming ==
The bird was named after the Arctic explorer Sir John Franklin, who led an 1823 expedition in which the first specimen of Franklin's gull was taken.

== Status ==
This species has a wide distribution range and a large population which is currently increasing, and is therefore classified as "Least Concern" on the IUCN Red List.

Wetlands International estimated at 2018 the global population at 1,000,000-1,490,000 individuals.

== Gallery ==
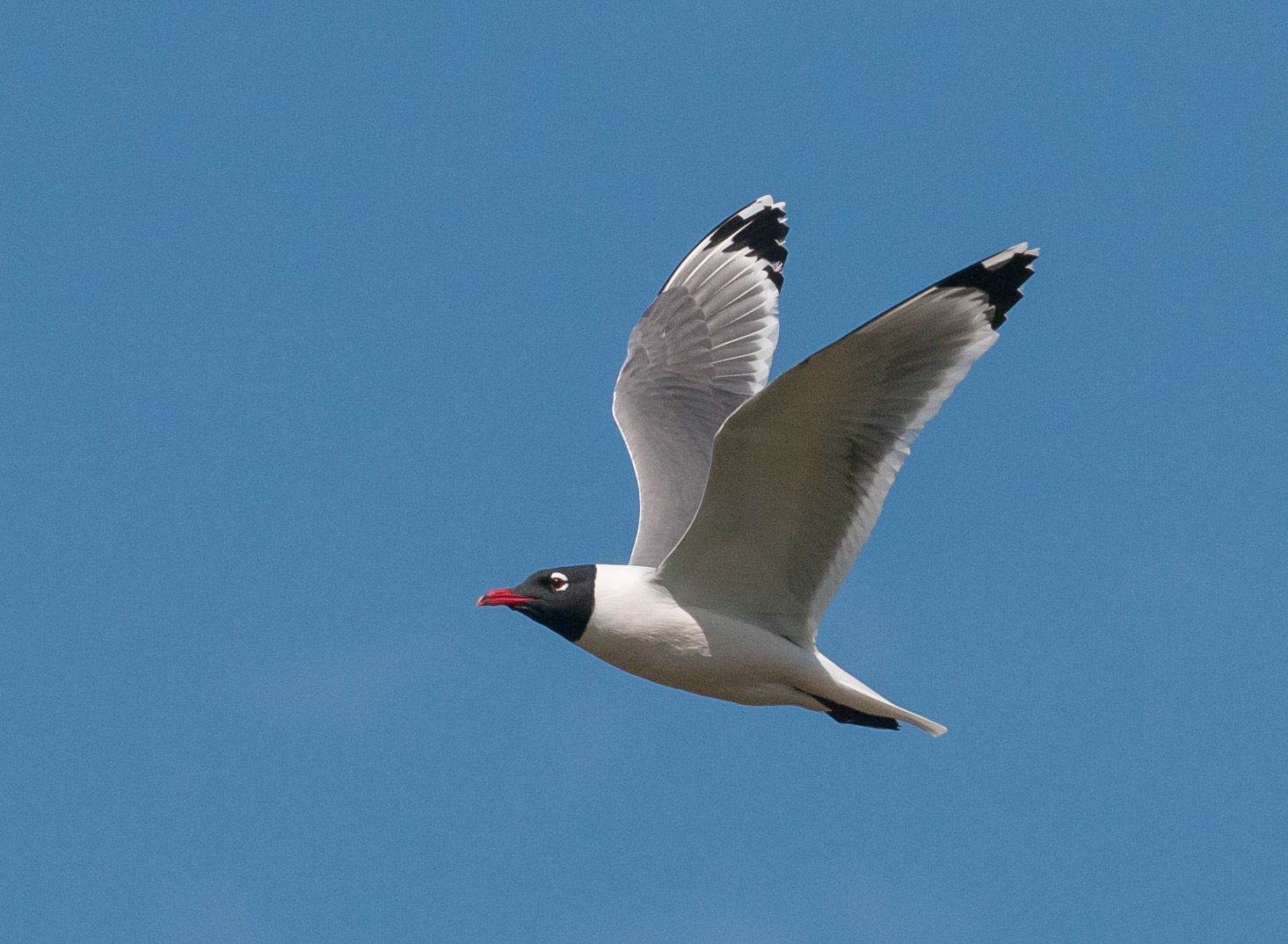
Adult in summer plumage, Logan, Utah

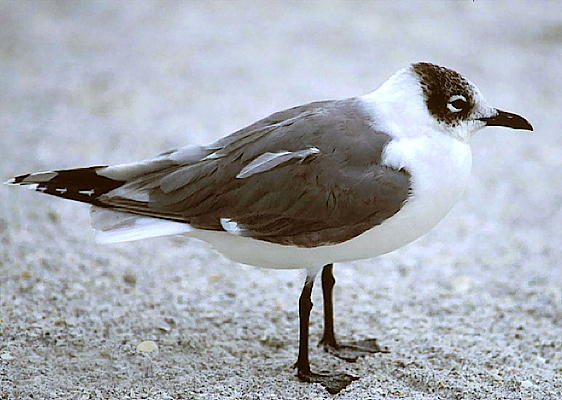
Adult in winter plumage

Brisbane, Australia, June 1998 (53-second video)

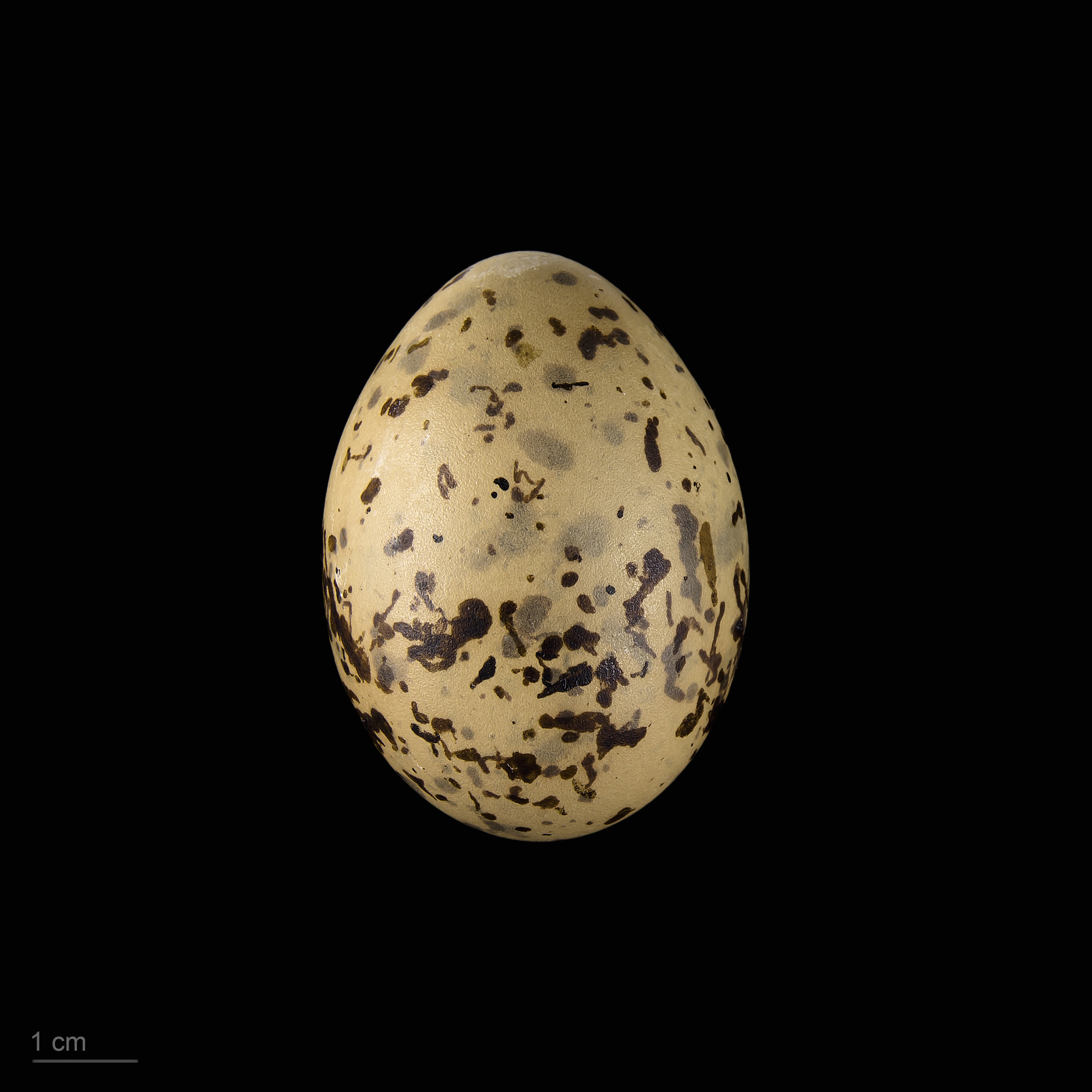
Leucophaeus pipixcan - MHNT
