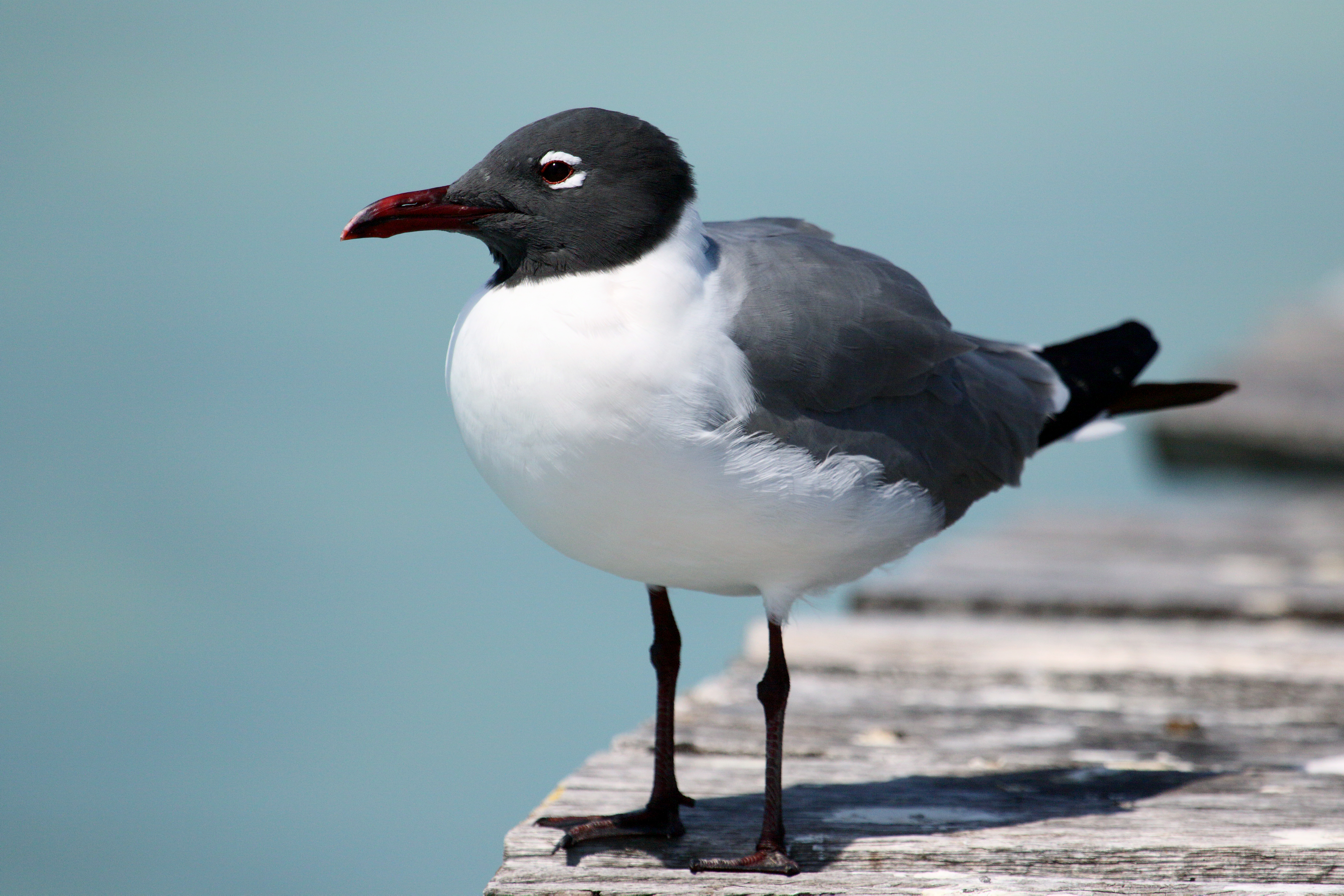

Conservation status
- Least Concern (IUCN 3.1)

Scientific classification
- Kingdom: Animalia
- Phylum: Chordata
- Class: Aves
- Order: Charadriiformes
- Family: Laridae
- Genus: Leucophaeus
- Species: L. atricilla

Binomial name
- Leucophaeus atricilla (Linnaeus, 1758)
- geographical range breeding year-round nonbreeding

Synonyms
- Larus atricilla Linnaeus, 1758

Audio
- Call

= Laughing gull =

Species of bird

The laughing gull (Leucophaeus atricilla) is a medium-sized gull of North and South America. Named from its laugh-like call, it is an opportunistic omnivore and scavenger. It breeds in large colonies mostly along the Atlantic coast of North America, the Caribbean, and northern South America. Two subspecies are accepted, L. a. atricilla, which occurs from the West Indies to the Venezuelan islands, and L. a. megalopterus, which occurs from southeast Canada down to Central America. The laughing gull was long placed in the genus Larus until its present placement in Leucophaeus.

== Taxonomy ==
The laughing gull was formally described in 1758 by the Swedish naturalist Carl Linnaeus in the tenth edition of his Systema Naturae under the binomial name Larus atricilla. Linnaeus based his account on the "laughing gull" from the Bahamas that had been described and illustrated in 1729–1732 by the English naturalist Mark Catesby in his The Natural History of Carolina, Florida and the Bahama Islands. The laughing gull is now one of five New World gulls placed in the genus Leucophaeus that was introduced in 1855 by the German ornithologist Carl Friedrich Bruch. The genus name Leucophaeus is from Ancient Greek leukos meaning "white" and phaios meaning "dusky". The specific epithet atricilla combines Latin ater meaning "black" with Modern Latin cilla meaning "tail"; the tail is black in young birds. It is however possible that Linnaeus intended to write atricapilla meaning "black-capped".

Like most other members of the genus Leucophaeus, the laughing gull was long placed in the genus Larus. It was moved to the resurrected genus Leucophaeus based on a 2005 molecular phylogenetic study that found that inclusion in Larus made that genus paraphyletic.

Two subspecies are accepted. They are listed below with their breeding ranges.

Image	Subspecies	Distribution
	L. a. megalopterus (Bruch, 1855)	islands off west North Atlantic coast of southeast Canada (sporadic or formerly), Maine to Florida, Gulf of Mexico to south Texas, Salton Sea (southeast California; formerly), Gulf of California to Colima
	L. a. atricilla (Linnaeus, 1758)	West Indies, islands off Yucatán Peninsula, islands north of Venezuela, Trinidad and Tobago and to French Guiana

== Description ==
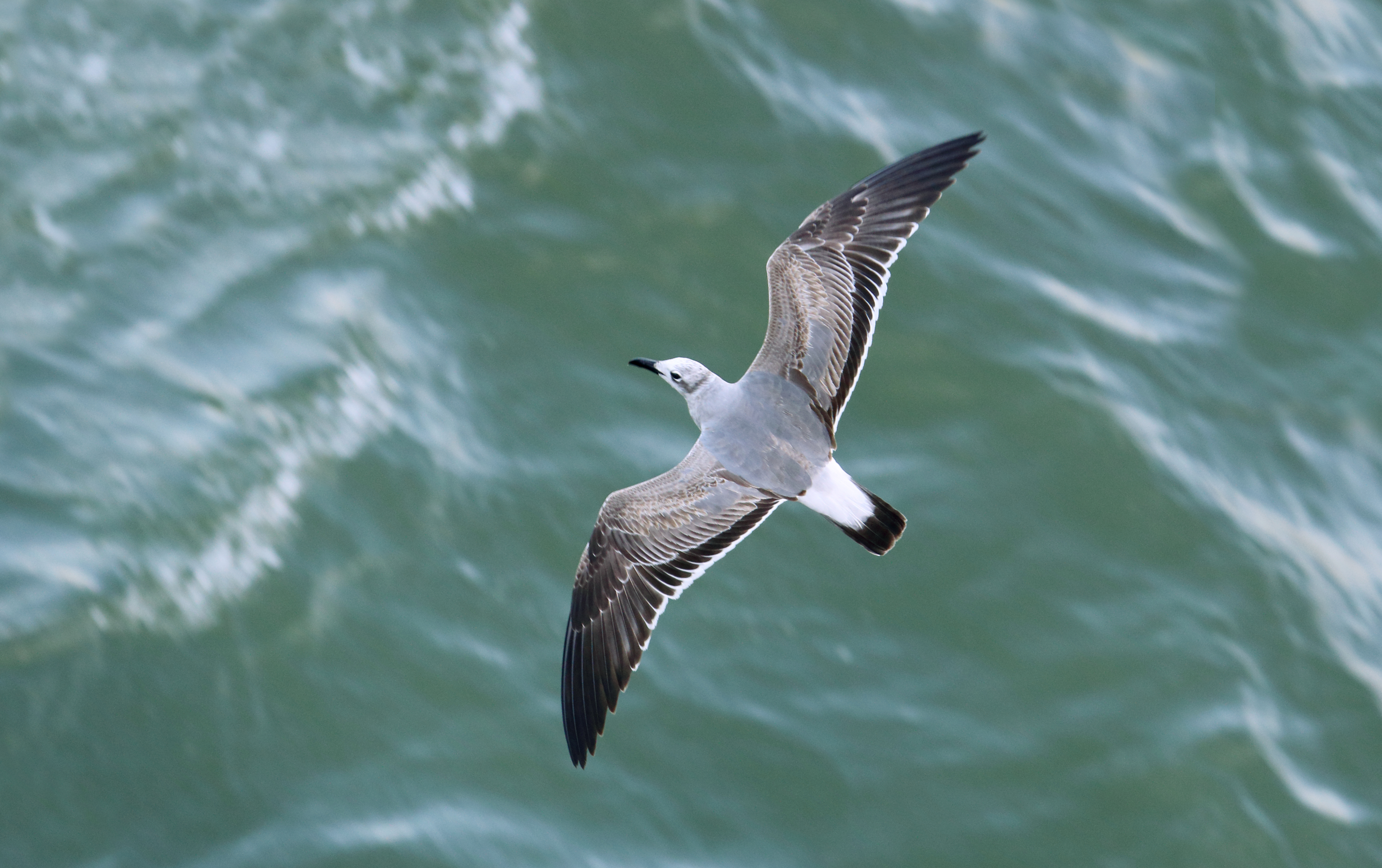
Leucophaeus atricilla atricilla, first-winter; Colon, Panama. Note the black tail from which the epithet atricilla derives.

This species is 36–41 cm (14–16 in) long with a 98–110 cm (39–43 in) wingspan and a weight range of 203–371 grams (7.2–13.1 oz). The summer adult's body is white apart from the dark grey back and wings and black head. Its wings are much darker grey than all other gulls of similar size except the smaller Franklin's gull, and they have black tips without the white crescent shown by Franklin's. The beak is long and red. The black hood is mostly lost in winter.

Laughing gulls take three years to reach adult plumage. Immature birds are always darker than most similar-sized gulls other than Franklin's. First-year birds are greyer below and have paler heads than first-year Franklin's, and have an all-black tail. Second-year birds can be distinguished by the wing pattern, with more extensive black on the primary coverts, and sometimes still some black on the tail. The laughing gull's English name is derived from its raucous kee-agh call, which sounds like a high-pitched laugh "ha... ha... ha...".

== Distribution and habitat ==
It breeds on the Atlantic coast of North America, the Caribbean, and northern South America. Northernmost populations migrate farther south in winter, and this species occurs as a rare vagrant to western Europe.

== Behavior ==
=== Breeding ===
Laughing gulls nest from mid to late May in the north of their range and from late April in the south. They nest in colonies which vary in size from a few pairs to 25,000. The nest site is usually on low lying coastal islands. The nest is built by both sexes from available vegetation. The clutch is usually three eggs which are incubated by both parents for 22-27 days. The chicks normally remain near to the nest for the first 5 days. They are fed and brooded by both parents. The young can fly when they are around 40 days old.

== Gallery ==
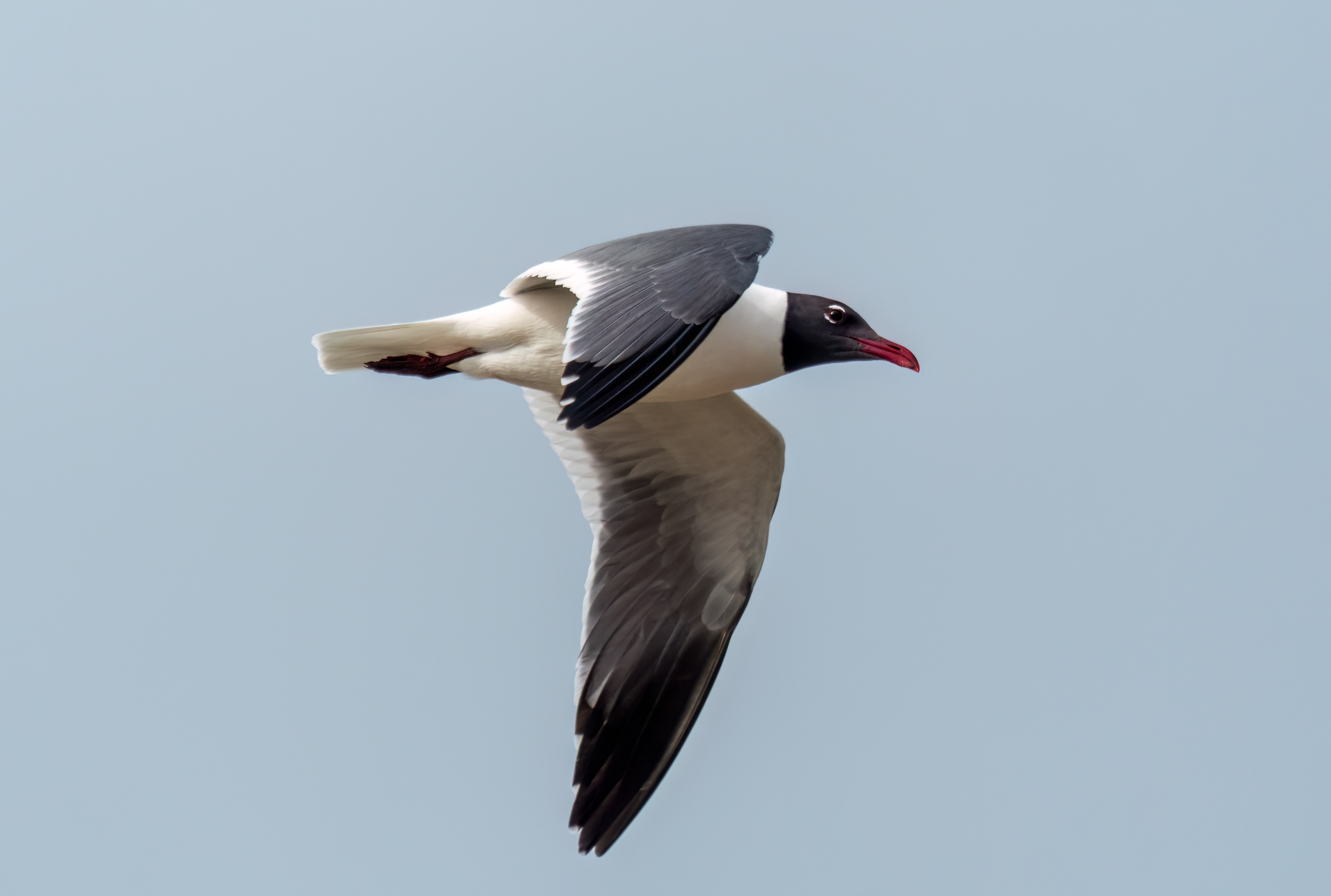
Adult summer plumage, in flight

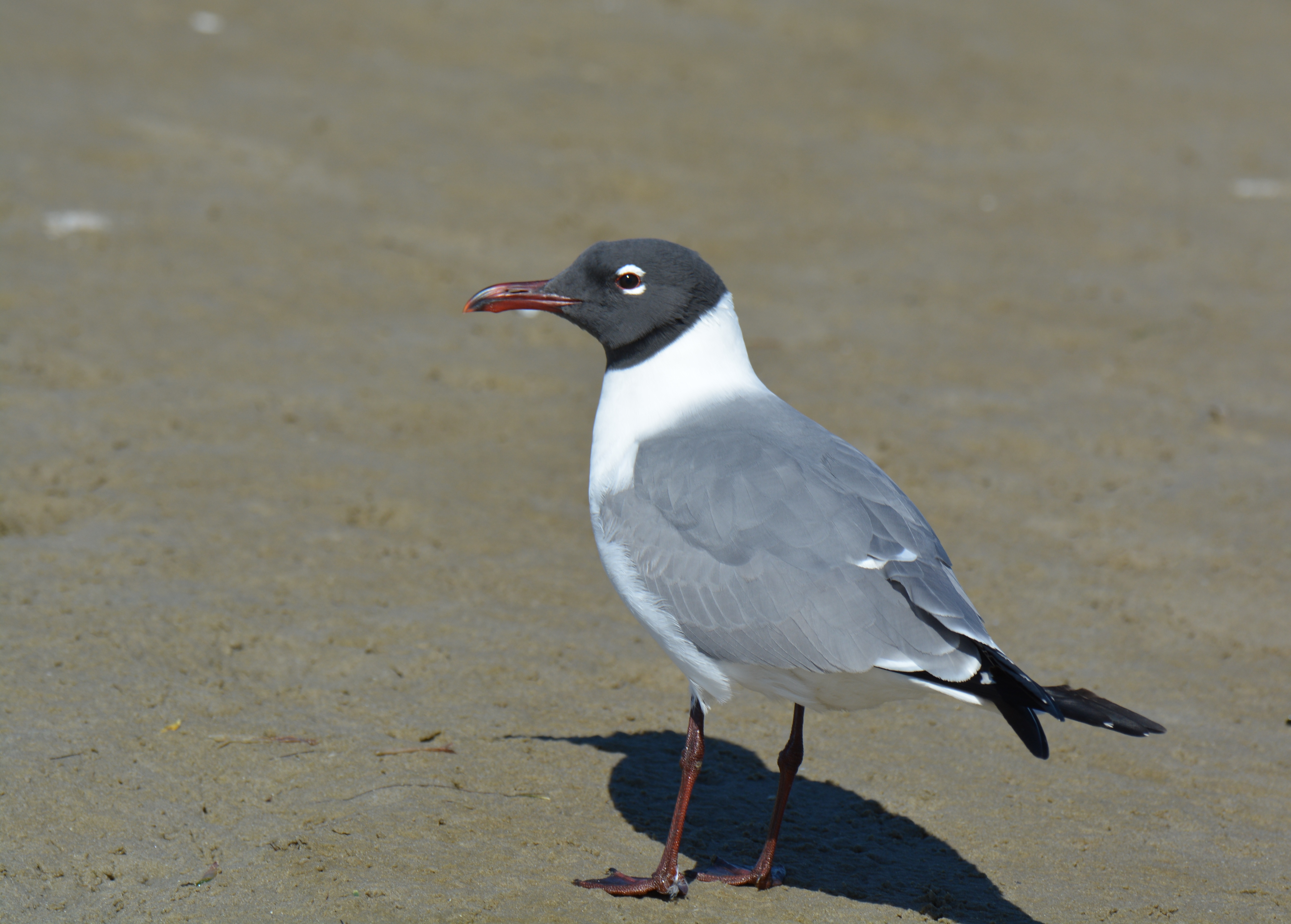
Summer (breeding) plumage includes black head and dark red bill

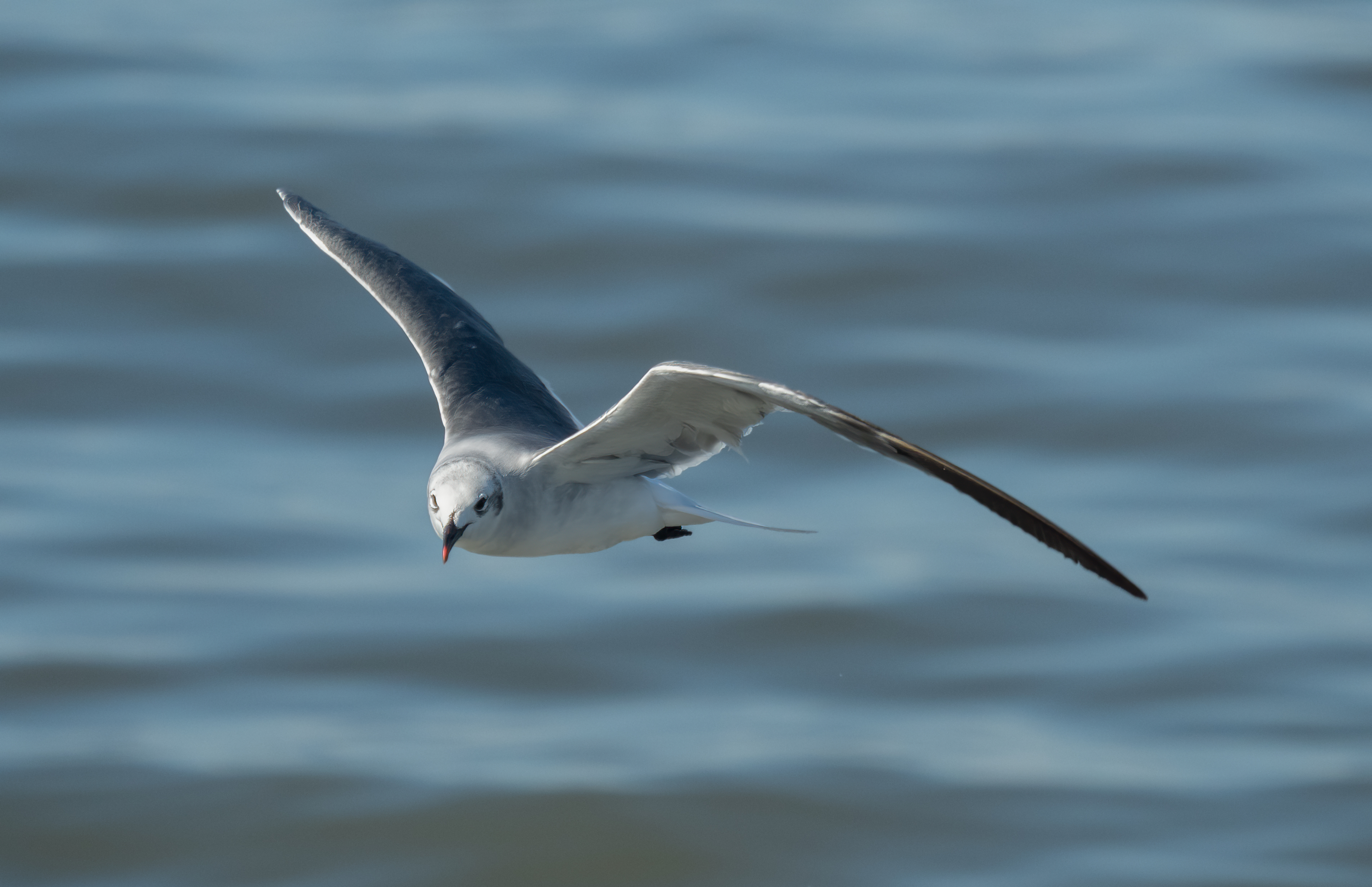
Adult in winter plumage in flight

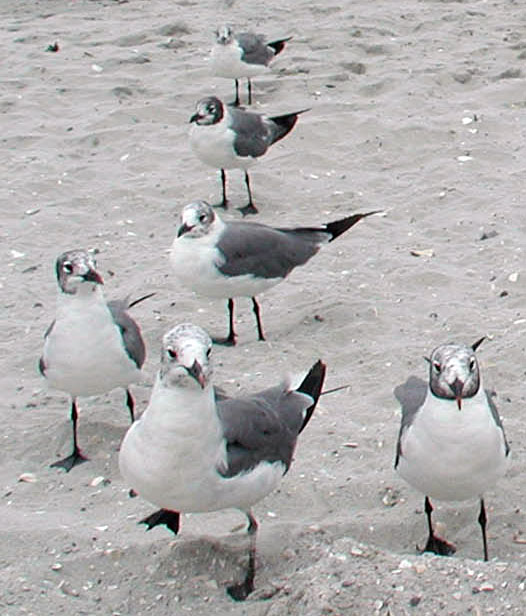
Adult in winter plumage

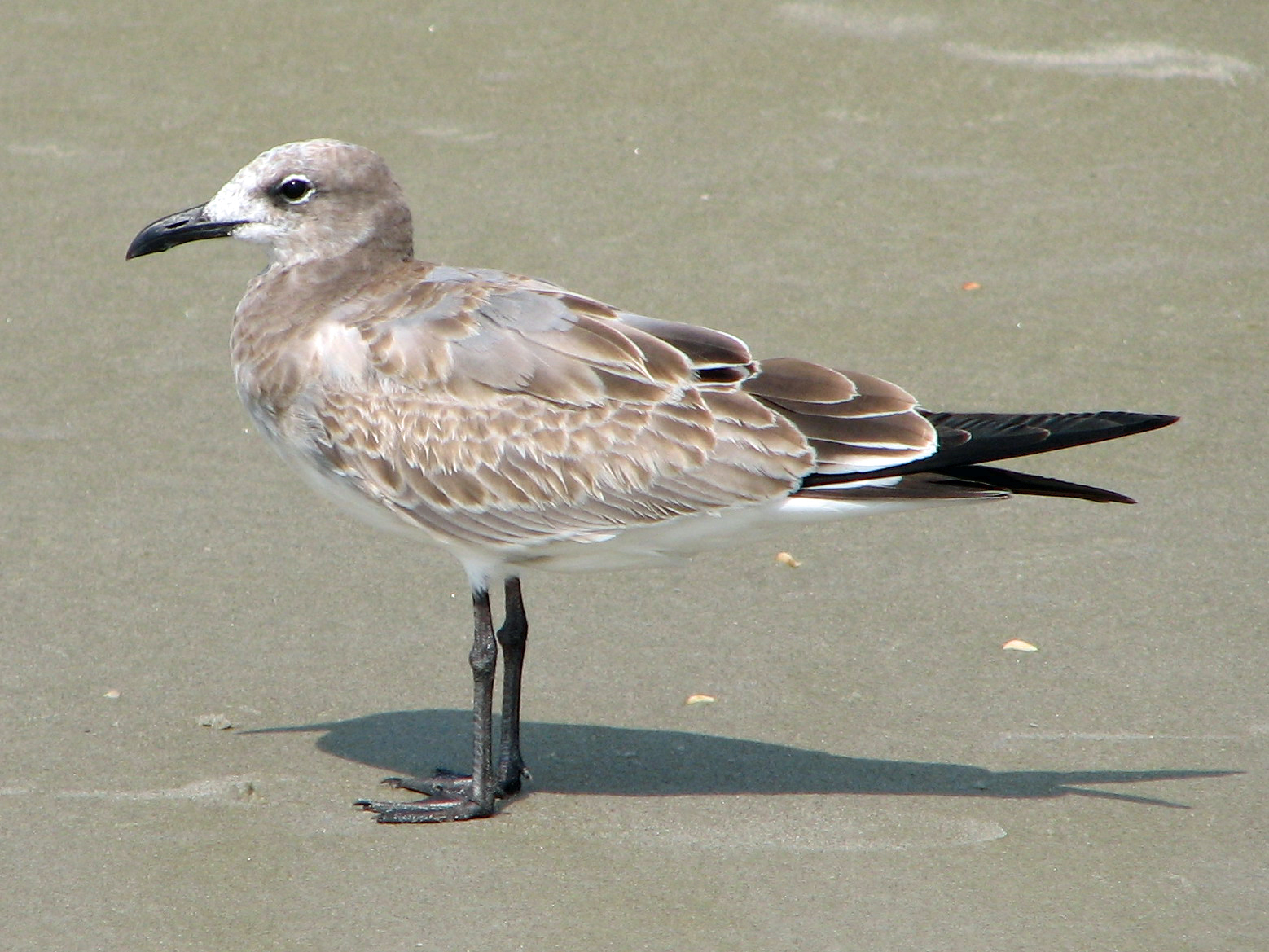
Juvenile starting molt to first-winter

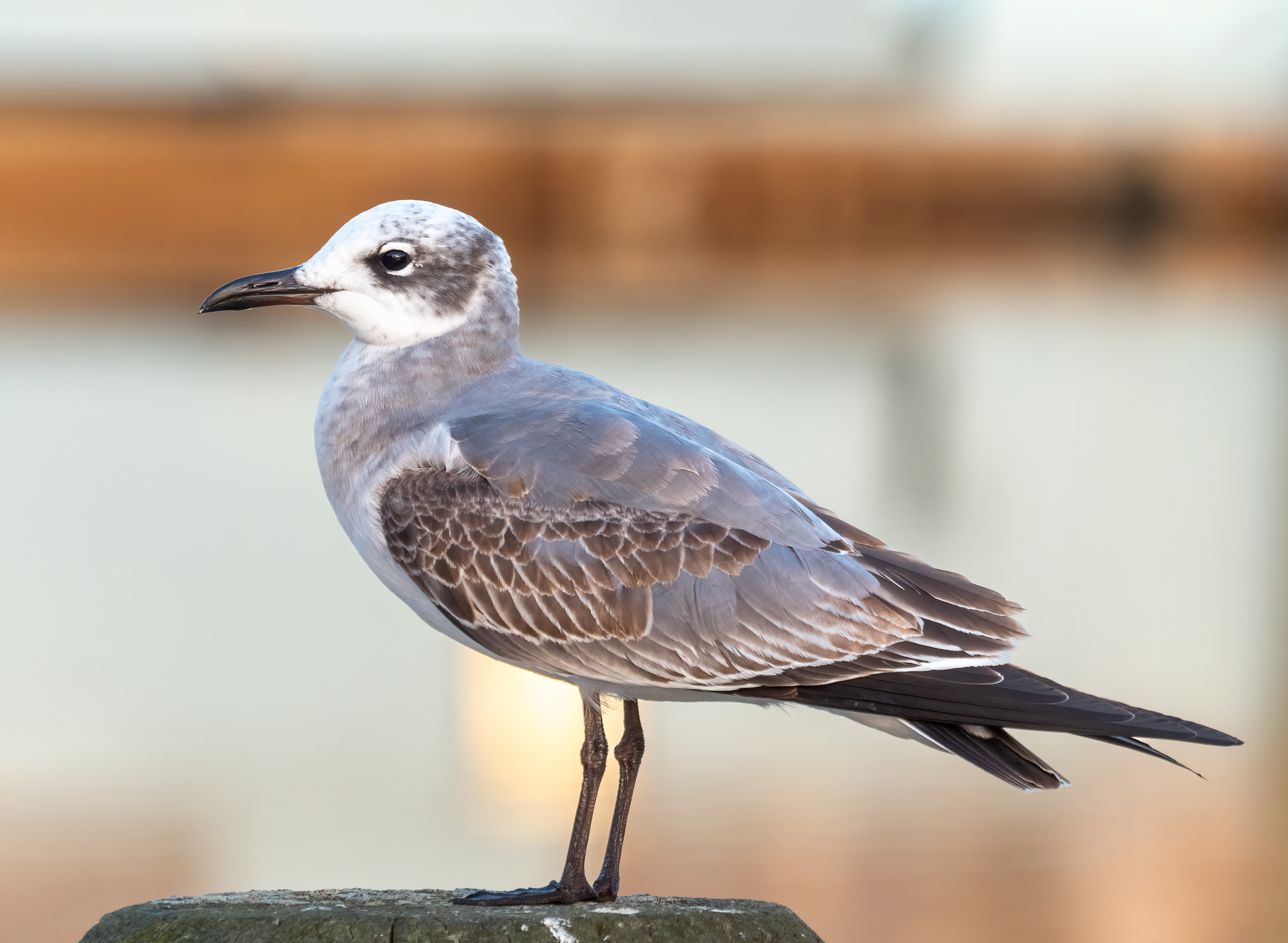
First winter laughing gull in Riverhead, New York

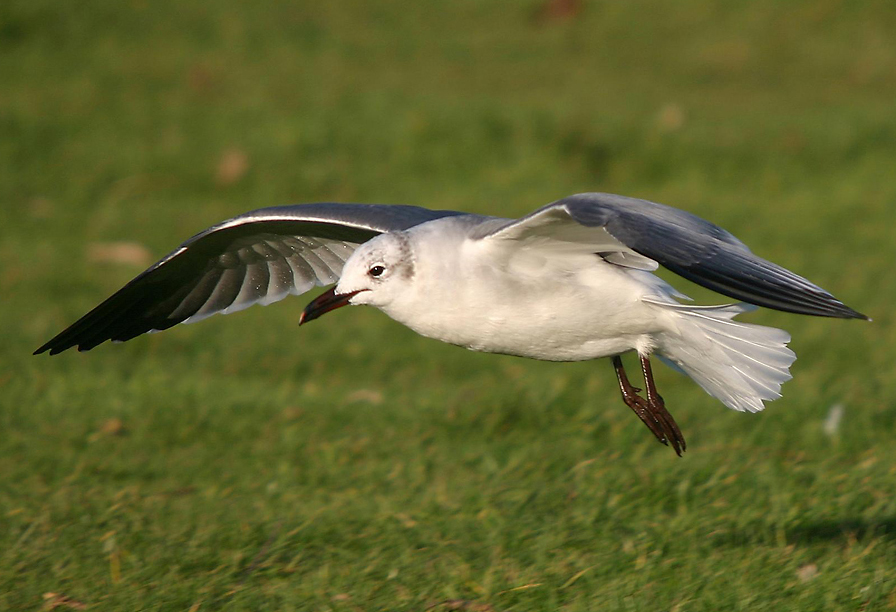
Vagrant in adult winter plumage in the UK in late 2005

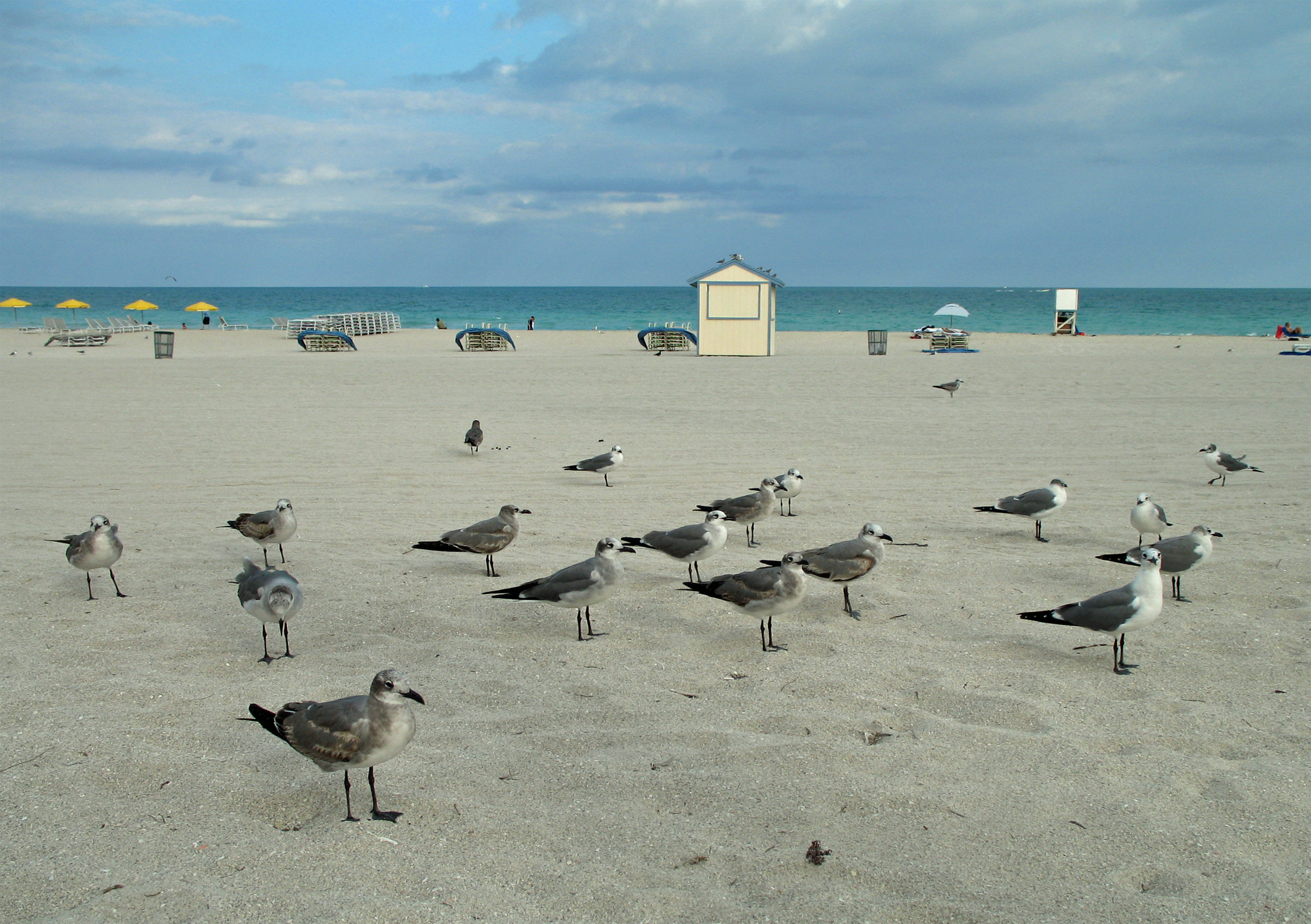
Flock with first, second, and adult winter birds, Miami

Laughing gulls following a shrimp boat off the coast of Jacksonville, Florida

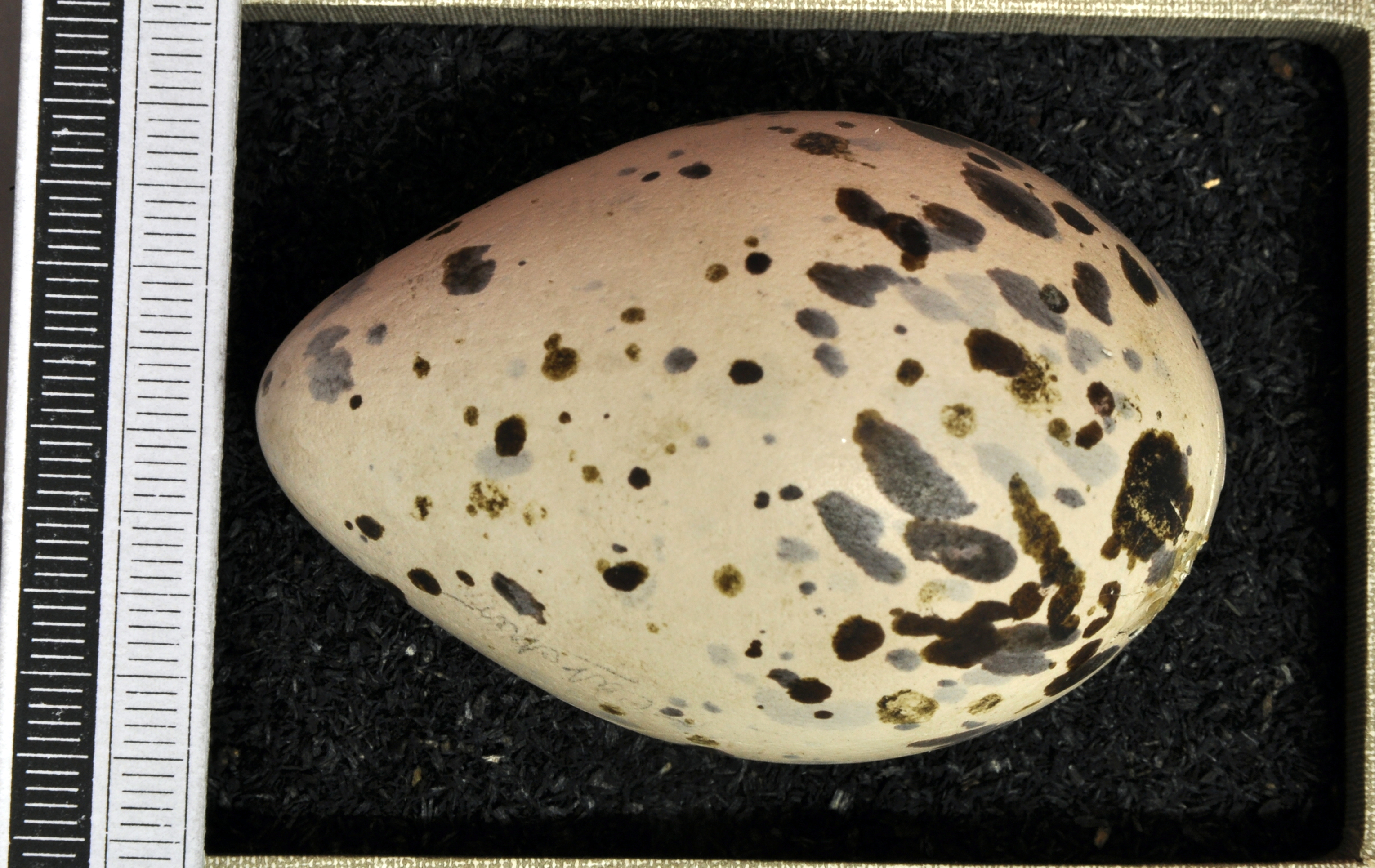
Egg, Collection Museum Wiesbaden
