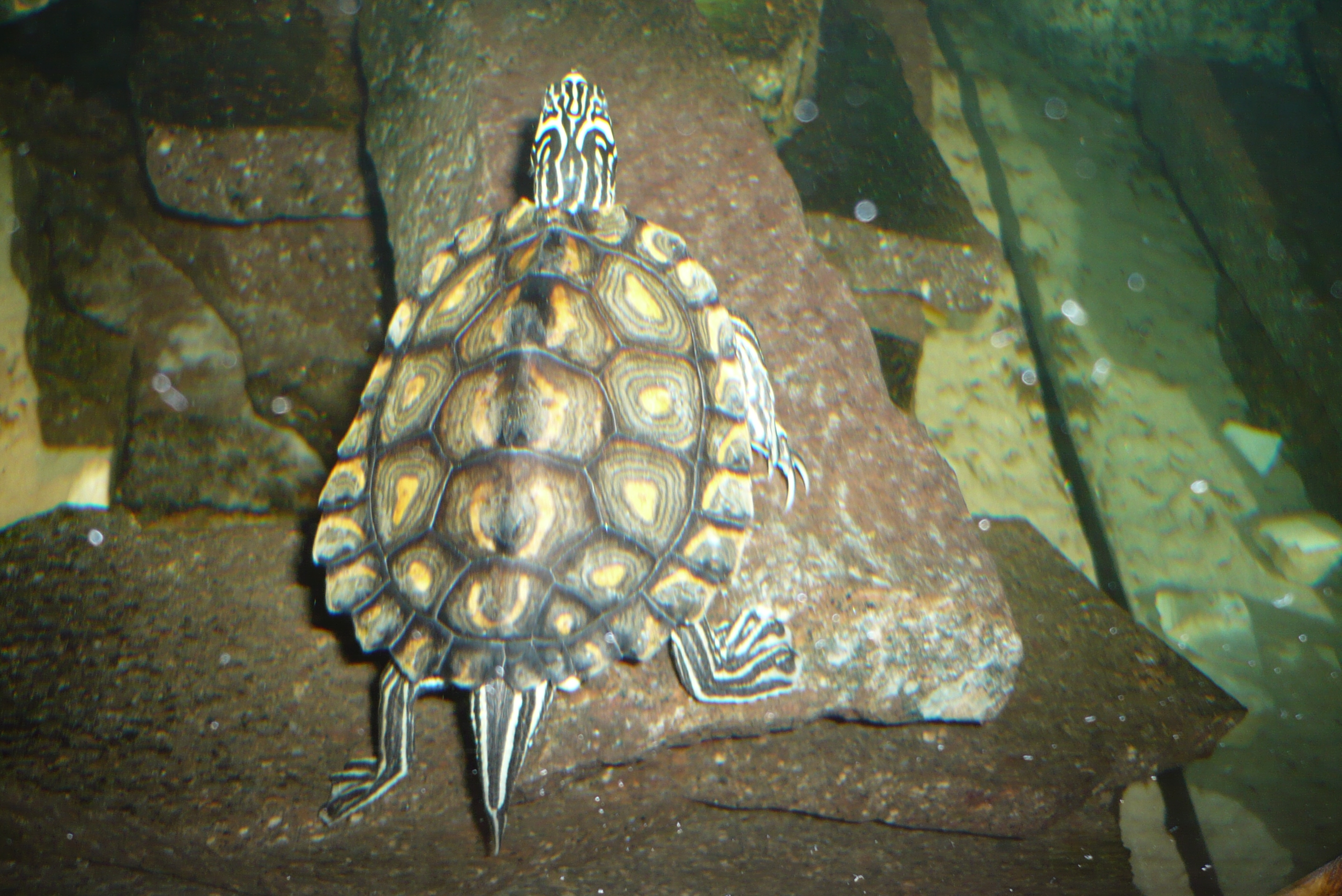

Conservation status
- Vulnerable (IUCN 3.1)

- Threatened (ESA)

Scientific classification
- Kingdom: Animalia
- Phylum: Chordata
- Class: Reptilia
- Order: Testudines
- Suborder: Cryptodira
- Family: Emydidae
- Genus: Graptemys
- Species: G. flavimaculata

Binomial name
- Graptemys flavimaculata Cagle, 1954

Synonyms
- Graptemys flavimaculata Cagle, 1954; Graptemys oculifera flavimaculata — Mertens & Wermuth, 1955; Malaclemys flavomaculata McDowell, 1964 (ex errore); Malaclemys flavimaculata — Cochran & Goin, 1970; Graptemys flavimaculata — Conant, 1975

= Yellow-blotched map turtle =

Species of turtle

The yellow-blotched map turtle (Graptemys flavimaculata), or yellow-blotched sawback, is a species of turtle in the family Emydidae. It is part of the narrow-headed group of map turtles, and is endemic to the southern United States.

== Geographic range ==
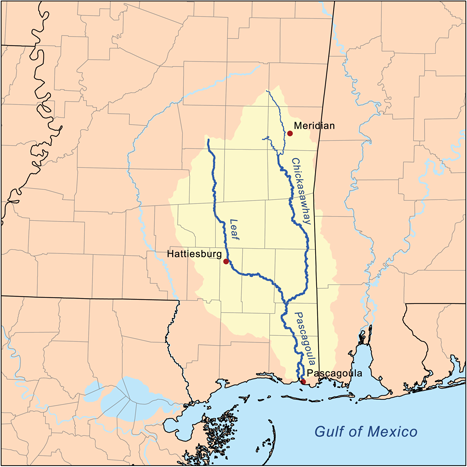
Geographic range

Its distribution is limited to the Pascagoula River of Mississippi and most of its tributaries (a range it shares with the Pascagoula map turtle).

== Home range ==
Males have a mean home range area of 1.12 ha (2.77 acres) and a mean home range length of 1.8 km (1.1 mi). Females have a mean home range area of 5.75 ha (14.20 acres), due to nesting activities, and a mean home range length of 1.5 km (0.93 mi).

== Description ==
Yellow-blotched map turtles are medium- to small-sized turtles, with males ranging from 3.5 to 4.5 in (9-11.5 cm) in carapace length as adults. Adult females are larger, about 5 to 7.5 in (13–19 cm) in carapace length. The yellow-blotched map turtle has the highest central keel of all map turtles.

== Diet ==
Yellow-blotched map turtles feed mostly on insects, but are opportunistic feeders, so also consume crustaceans, fish, and some fresh plant matter.

== Conservation status ==
This species is listed as threatened under the US Endangered Species Act due to a recent decline. This can be attributed to a low reproductive frequency as compared with most other map turtles. A high level of nest mortality due to fish crow predation and river flooding are also attributed to endangerment. Unexpectedly high occurrences of nesting in shaded areas could possibly be attributed to human disturbances on and near sandbars, which raises mortality rates. Human disturbances are primarily boating activities that are popular in the Pascagoula of Mississippi increasing the female turtle's energetic cost of nesting overall preventing their population to grow.

Also, its habitat suffers from pollution and agricultural changes to water levels, affecting nesting beaches. "Turtle plinking", shooting turtles for casual target practice, kills significant portions of this endangered turtle's population each year.

Since yellow-blotched map turtles are freshwater turtles mainly found in the Pascagoula River of Mississippi, human disturbances like an increase in boats in the area of inhabitance, also leads to many physiological issues due to less time to bask or endangerment of the nest.

As a member of the listed Graptemys genus, G. flavimaculata receives protection under Appendix III of the Convention on International Trade in Endangered Species of Wild Fauna and Flora (CITES).

== Predation ==
Predators of this turtle mainly target nests. These predators include fish crows (especially on sand bars), but other nest predators include red imported fire ants, common kingsnakes, raccoons, wild boars, nine-banded armadilloes and gray foxes.
