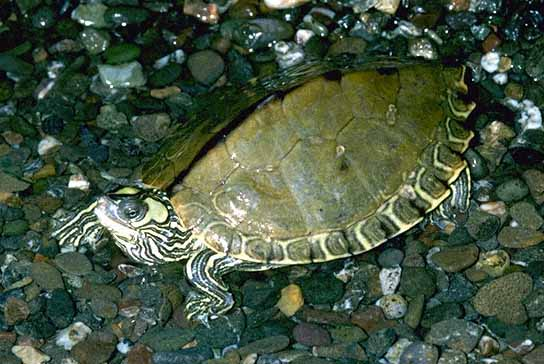

Conservation status
- Endangered (IUCN 3.1)
- CITES Appendix II

Scientific classification
- Kingdom: Animalia
- Phylum: Chordata
- Class: Reptilia
- Order: Testudines
- Suborder: Cryptodira
- Family: Emydidae
- Genus: Graptemys
- Species: G. gibbonsi

Binomial name
- Graptemys gibbonsi Lovich & McCoy, 1992
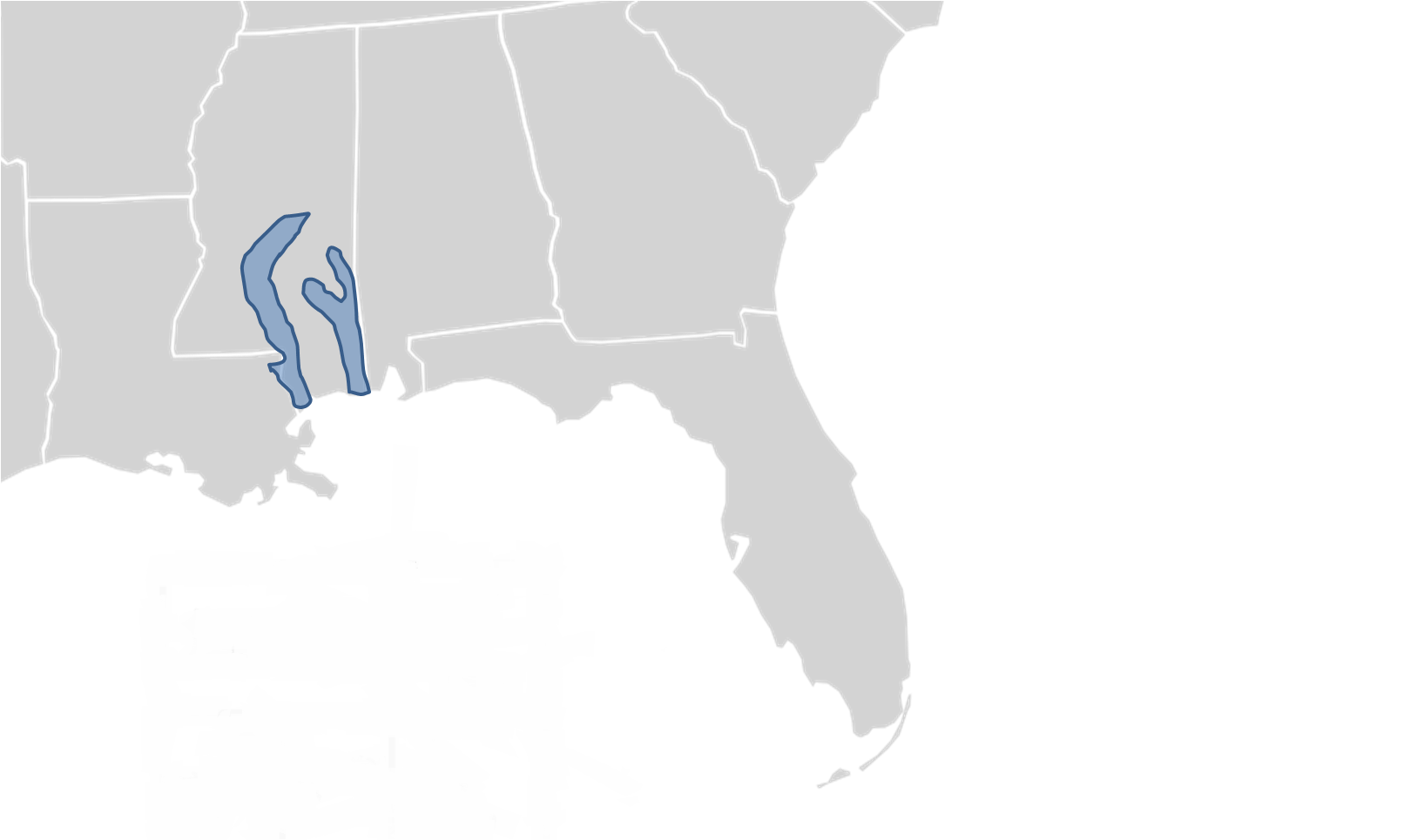
- Combined range map of Pascagoula map turtle (eastern blue section) and Pearl River map turtle (western blue section)

Synonyms
- Graptemys gibbonsi Lovich & McCoy, 1992; Graptemys pulchra gibbonsi — Artner, 2003; Graptemys gibbousi [sic] Obst, 2003 (ex errore)

= Pascagoula map turtle =

Species of turtle

The Pascagoula map turtle (Graptemys gibbonsi) is a species of turtle in the family Emydidae. The species is native to the southern United States.

== Geographic range ==
The Pascagoula map turtle is restricted to the Pascagoula River system in the state of Mississippi in the United States. It formerly included a population in the Pearl River, but in 2010, that population was described as a separate species, the Pearl River map turtle, Graptemys pearlensis. The Pascagoula map turtle shares its range with the yellow-blotched map turtle, Graptemys flavimaculata.

== Etymology ==
The specific name, gibbonsi, is in honor of American herpetologist "Whit" Gibbons.

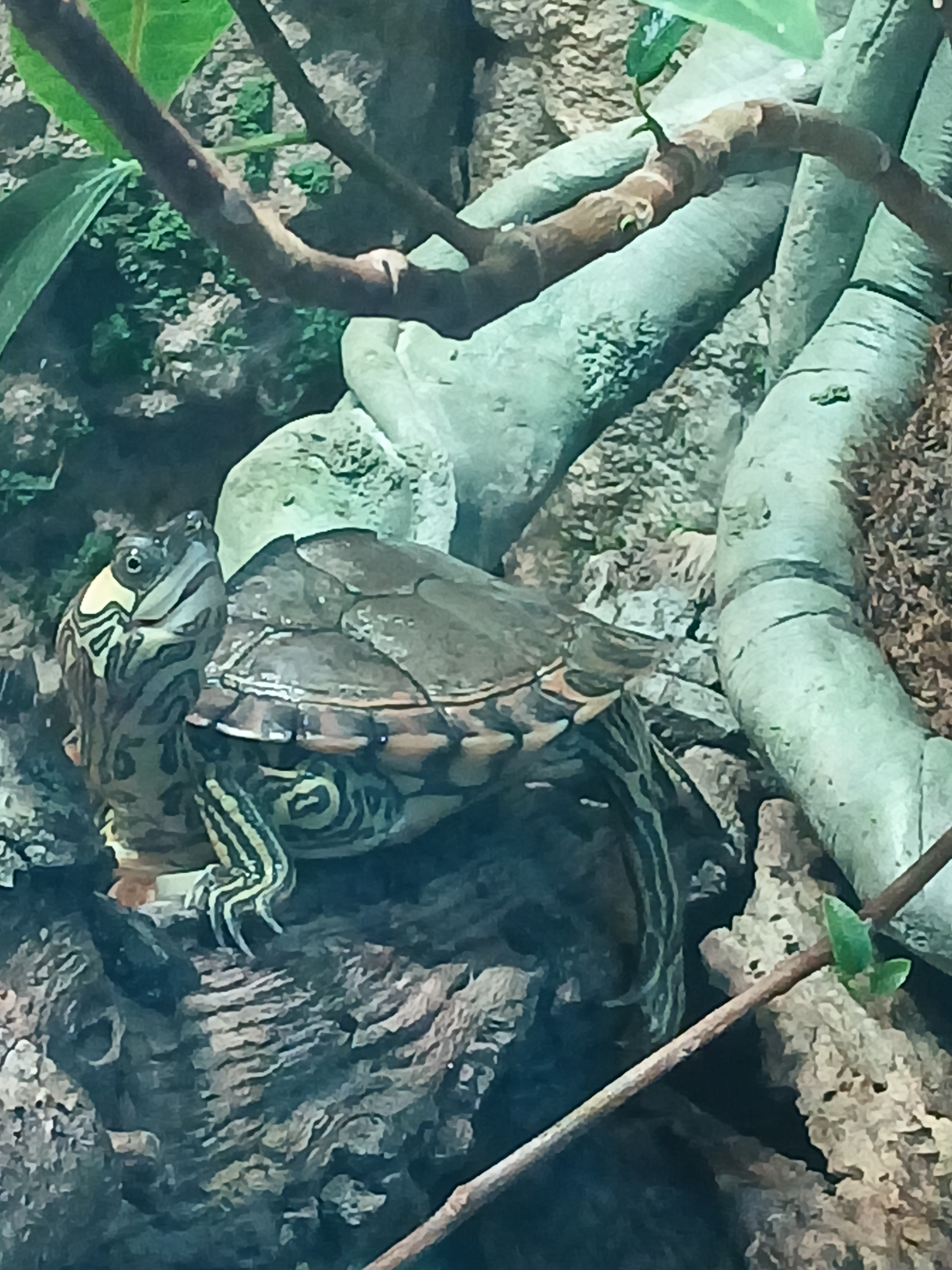
Pascagoula Map Turtle at the San Diego Zoo

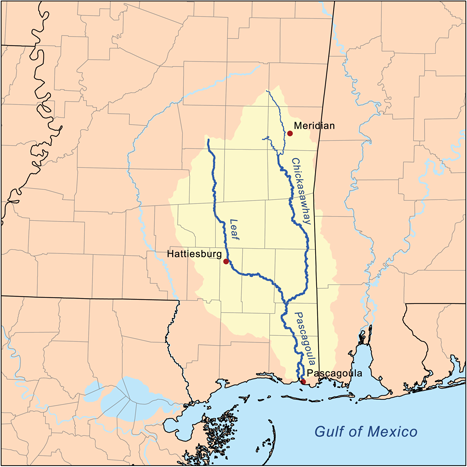
Pascagoula river map
