= Carl Friedrich Bruch =

German ornithologist (1789–1857)

Carl Friedrich Bruch (March 11, 1789 – December 21, 1857) was a German ornithologist. He was the younger brother of bryologist Philipp Bruch (1781–1847).

Bruch was born in Zweibrücken. Up until 1855, he worked as a notary in Mainz. He was the author of numerous articles in the journals Isis and Journal für Ornithologie. He was a catalyst towards the establishment of the Rheinische Naturforschende Gesellschaft (1834).

In 1828, he proposed a system of trinomial nomenclature for species, in contrast to the binomial system of Carl Linnaeus. The following are a list of ornithological species described by Bruch:

- Dalmatian pelican, (Pelecanus crispus), 1832
- Hartlaub's gull, (Chroicocephalus hartlaubii), 1853
- Red-legged kittiwake, (Rissa brevirostris), 1853
- Sooty gull (Ichthyaetus hemprichii), 1853.
