= La Grajera Reservoir =

Reservoir in Spain

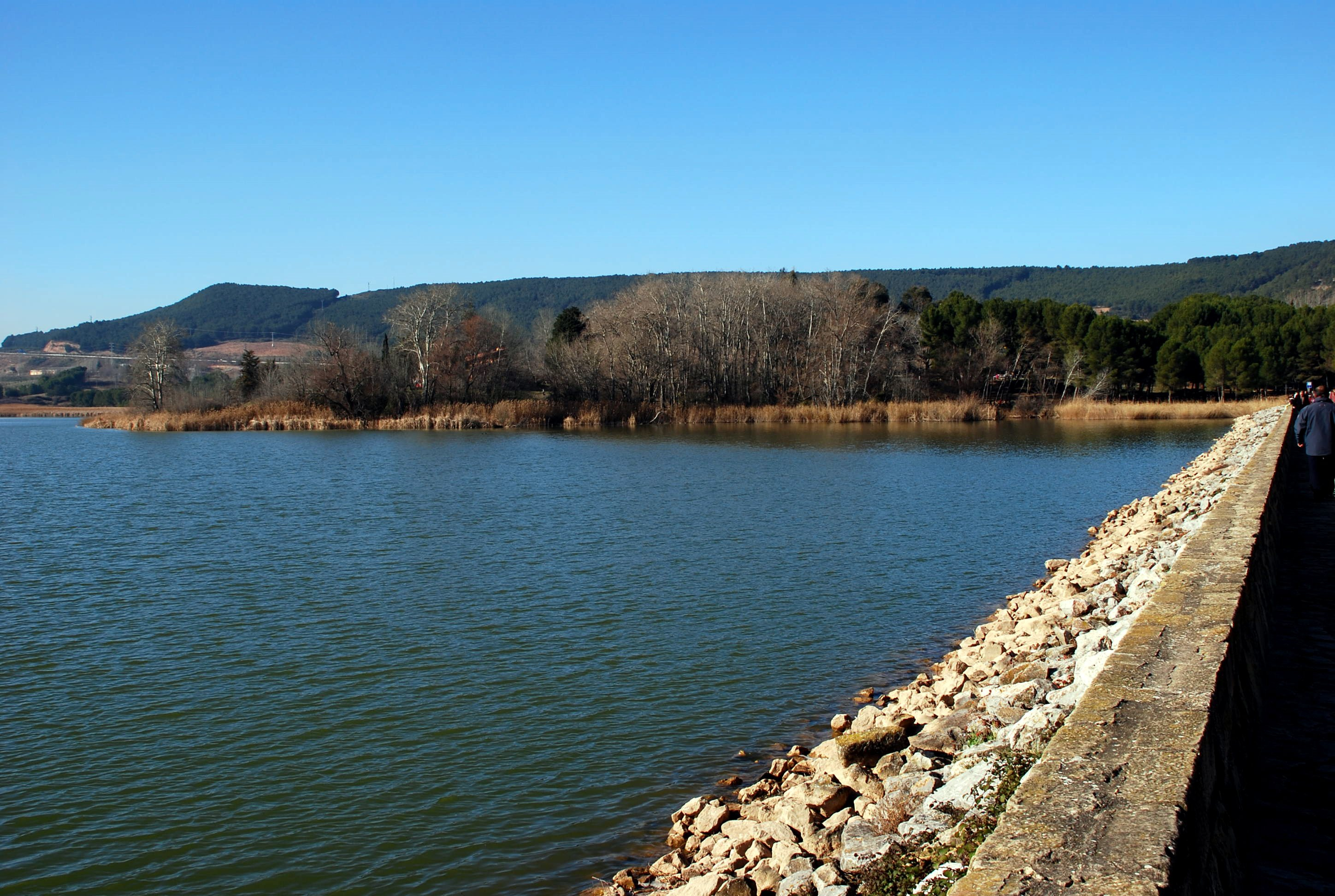
- La Grajera Dam
- Interactive map of La Grajera Reservoir
- Coordinates: 42°26′40″N 2°30′14″W
- Primary inflows: Somero River
- Primary outflows: Ebro Basin
- Settlements: Logroño

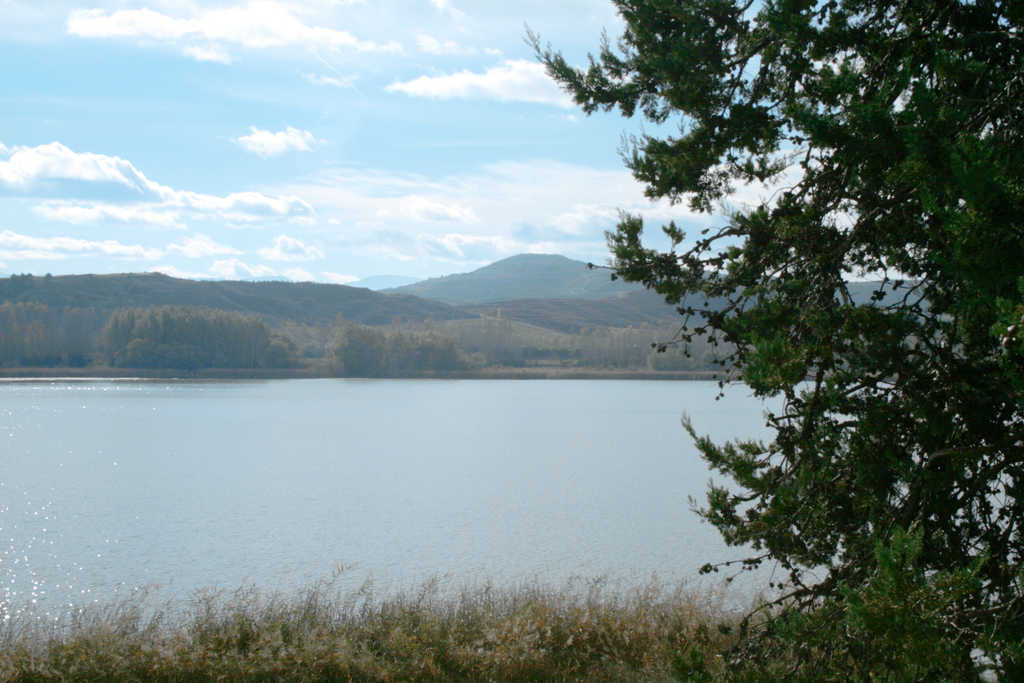
La Grajera Reservoir.

La Grajera Reservoir (Spanish : Embalse del Ebro La Grajera) is a reservoir located south of the city of Logroño, Spain, approximately five kilometers from the city center. It is situated along the Camino de Santiago and serves as a leisure area as well.

== History ==
The reservoir was constructed in 1883 on an endorheic lake. Its initial purpose was to collect water from the Iregua River to irrigate the fields south of Logroño.

In 1908, the area was expanded. At the end of the 20th century, the area was adapted for recreational use, with additional zones added. On September 17, 1992, La Grajera Leisure Park was inaugurated. The park covers 55 hectares, and together with the 32-hectare reservoir, the total area amounts to 87 hectares. The nearby golf course spans 85 hectares.

== Geology ==
The lake is endorheic, located in layered detrital sedimentary hills. It is dominated by red clay, loamy and marl soils, with some gypsum outcrops visible.

== The Park ==
La Grajera is one of the few wetlands near Logroño. Besides being a natural area, it offers various recreational and sporting activities. Walking trails are available for pedestrians and cyclists. There is also a golf course nearby.

Three distinct zones have been established: the reception area, the restricted area, and the protected area.

=== Reception Area ===
The reception area includes a restaurant, a bar, and picnic areas equipped with grills, benches, and tables. A "Didactic Room" is also present, which contains a playroom, exhibition space, and library. Guided tours, courses, workshops, and various environmental activities are organized here.

=== Restricted Area ===
This area is dedicated to birdwatching. From the observatory, species such as osprey, white-headed duck, mallard, egrets, northern shoveler, and great crested grebes can be seen.

=== Protected Area ===
The reservoir spans 32 hectares with a depth of 5.5 meters and can hold a water volume of 2 hm^{3}. Entry is restricted except for educational or scientific purposes.
