= Vancouver Canada goose =

Conservation status
- Apparently Secure (NatureServe)

Scientific classification
- Kingdom: Animalia
- Phylum: Chordata
- Class: Aves
- Order: Anseriformes
- Family: Anatidae
- Genus: Branta
- Species: B. canadensis
- Subspecies: B. c. fulva

Trinomial name
- Branta canadensis fulva (Delacour, 1951)

Subspecies of bird

The Vancouver Canada goose (Branta canadensis fulva) is a subspecies of Canada goose, residing in western British Columbia and southern Alaska.

== Description ==
The Vancouver Canada goose is characterized as having a dark warm brown chest and body. It closely resembles the smaller Dusky Canada Goose (B. c. occidentalis) and is sometimes lumped as one subspecies, but averages larger with a slightly paler body and longer bill. It is also distinguished geographically and by mitochondrial DNA. Its weight ranges from 2.7 to 5.9 kg (6 to 13 lbs).

== Distribution ==
The native range of the Vancouver Canada goose is southern Alaska from Glacier Bay down to western British Columbia, where 90% of this subspecies remains year-round. Despite its name, this subspecies does not regularly occur in the city of Vancouver or the Lower Mainland, where it is replaced by the introduced resident Moffitt's Canada Geese (B. c. moffitti). Historically, it may have nested in the Fraser River.

== Breeding ==
The breeding biology of this species is poorly known, but unique among Canada Geese is that they use trees as perching and nesting sites during breeding season. It nests in dense temperate rainforests, up to 9m off the ground in tree snags.
