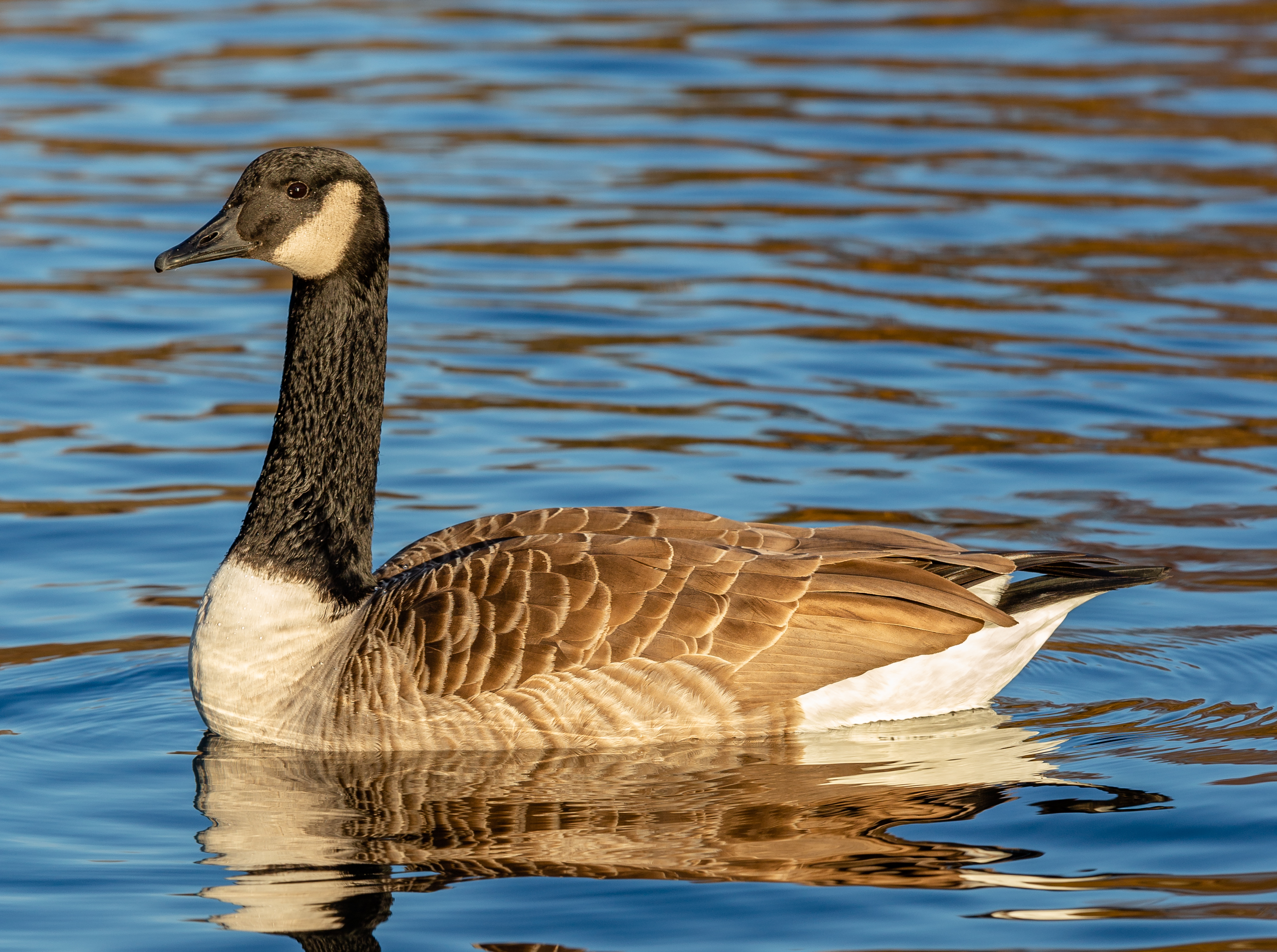
- In New Zealand, where the subspecies was introduced.

Scientific classification
- Kingdom: Animalia
- Phylum: Chordata
- Class: Aves
- Order: Anseriformes
- Family: Anatidae
- Genus: Branta
- Species: B. canadensis
- Subspecies: B. c. maxima

Trinomial name
- Branta canadensis maxima (Delacour, 1951)

= Giant Canada goose =

Subspecies of bird

The giant Canada goose (Branta canadensis maxima) is the largest subspecies of Canada goose, on average weighing in at 5 kg (11 pounds). It is found in central North America. These geese were at one point considered extinct, but were later rediscovered. The giant Canada goose was once kept and bred in captivity for use as hunting decoys and for food.

== Description ==
The giant Canada goose is often mistaken for the Moffitt's Canada goose. However, giant geese have both a lower call and a larger bill to body size ratio. Another good identifier includes the black on the neck, which starts much further up the neck than any other subspecies. The giant goose's white cheek patch is very large, reaching the lower bill. Unlike other variants, the underbelly is very pale. A less reliable identifier is the white forehead and eyebrows, which don't always occur and Moffitt's geese less commonly have. The wings measure between 480 mm (19 in) to 550 mm (22 in). The tail is between 147 mm (5.8 in) to 170 mm (6.7 in).

== Taxonomy ==
The giant Canada goose is occasionally classified with the Moffitt's Canada goose, forming a singular subspecies. It is also, alongside the dusky Canada goose, the closest relative to the Hawaiian goose.

== Recovery ==
In the 1950s, the giant Canada goose was declared extinct. However, a small population in Rochester, Minnesota was rediscovered by biologists in 1962. In recent years, the subspecies' numbers have been increasing and can commonly be found in parks and other urban areas.

=== Feral populations ===
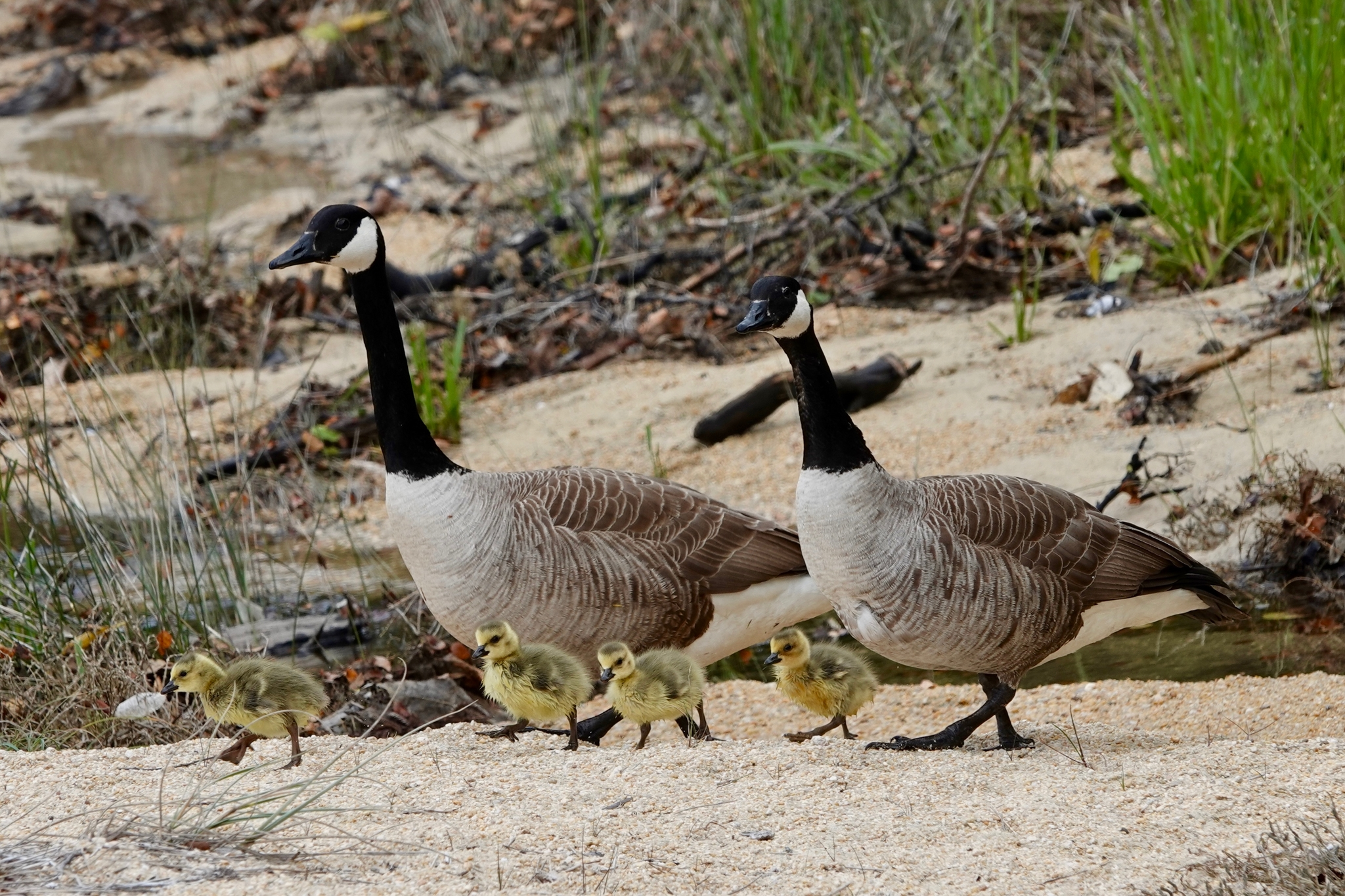
Pair with goslings, in New Zealand

It is thought that introduced populations of Canada geese in Europe are derived from B. c. maxima in addition to the nominate subspecies canadensis.

Canada geese were introduced to New Zealand from 1905-1920, where they have since established. The New Zealand population was subsequently determined to be composed of B. c. maxima, with a possible low degree of introgression from a smaller subspecies.
