= Branta thessaliensis =

Branta thessaliensis Temporal range: Late Miocene, 7.5-6.8 mya

Scientific classification
- Kingdom: Animalia
- Phylum: Chordata
- Class: Aves
- Order: Anseriformes
- Family: Anatidae
- Genus: Branta
- Species: B. thessaliensis

Binomial name
- Branta thessaliensis Boev & Koufos, 2006

Extinct species of bird

Branta thessaliensis is a prehistoric species of black goose known from fossils found in Greece. It is among the earliest known members of its genus.

Described in 2006, it was of similar size to the Canada goose. It is known from a humerus bone, which differs from the living species by a wider distal end of the diaphysis, a dorsal condyle that is more rounded in dorsal view and more prominent compared to the ventral condyle in distal view, and a deeper humerotricipital sulcus in distal view.

The fossil was found in a Late Miocene (Middle Turolian: European Mammal Neogene stage MN12, 7.5-6.8 million years ago) deposit at Perivolaki in Thessaly, after which region the species was named. Both near-shore freshwater bodies and open grassland habitat were found in the Perivolaki area during MN12.

The species provides further support for the distinctness of Branta from the Anser grey geese by that time. It also suggests that the present biogeography of Eurasian Branta - breeding at Arctic and wintering at Mediterranean latitudes - is a product of post-Miocene times, possibly due to range shifts during the ice age era. In this aspect it is notable that such a breeding-wintering range disjunction is less pronounced in the Canada and cackling geese of North America, where unlike in there was no W-E barrier (the Alpide belt) barring range shifts in response to the advancing ice.
