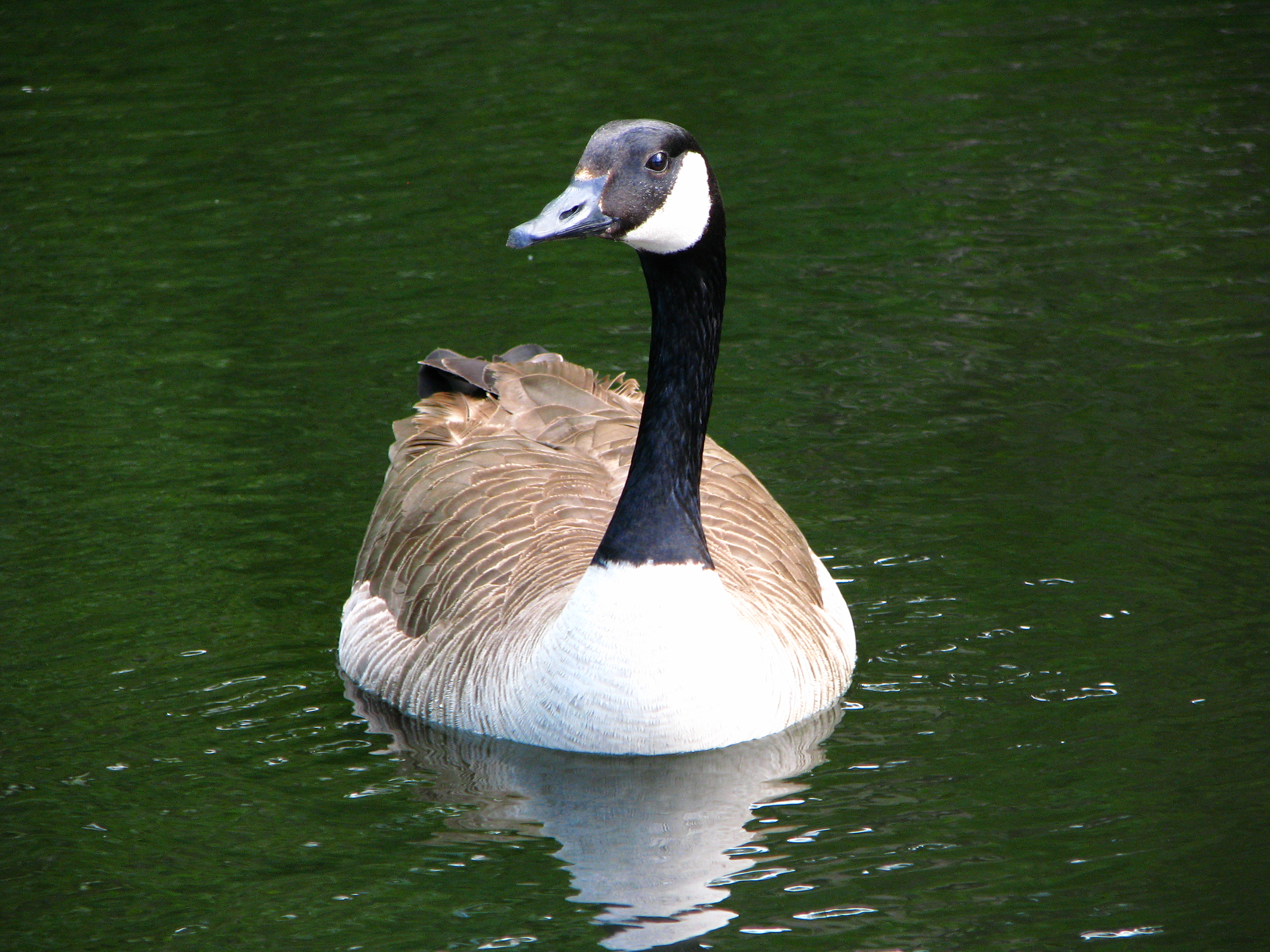
- A Canada goose (Branta canadensis) swimming at Smythe Park, Toronto, Ontario, Canada

Scientific classification
- Kingdom: Animalia
- Phylum: Chordata
- Class: Aves
- Order: Anseriformes
- Family: Anatidae
- Subfamily: Anserinae
- Genus: Branta; Scopoli, 1769

Type species
- Anas bernicla (Brant goose) Linnaeus, 1758

Species
- Branta bernicla Branta canadensis Branta hutchinsii Branta leucopsis Branta ruficollis Branta sandvicensis and see text

Synonyms
- Nesochen Salvadori, 1895

= Branta =

Black goose Temporal range: Late Miocene-Holocene

Genus of birds

The black geese or white-cheeked geese of the genus Branta are waterfowl belonging to the true goose and swan subfamily Anserinae. They occur in the northern coastal regions of the Palearctic and all over North America, migrating to more southerly coasts in winter, and as resident birds in the Hawaiian Islands. Alone in the Southern Hemisphere, a self-sustaining feral population derived from introduced Canada geese is also found in New Zealand.

The black geese derive their vernacular name for the prominent areas of black coloration found in all species and their secondary name from the markings on their cheeks. They can be distinguished from all other true geese by their legs and feet, which are black or very dark grey. Furthermore, they have black bills and large areas of black on the head and neck, with white (ochre in one species) markings that can be used to tell apart most species. (Note: The nēnē, which is aberrant in many respects, has no white on the head or neck and fairly little black, being quite similar to the swan goose in the color pattern of these areas, and was thus formerly assigned to the monotypic genus Nesochen. The swan goose, a grey goose, also has a black bill, but its reddish-orange legs indicate its actual relationships.) As with most geese, their undertail and uppertail coverts are white. They are also on average smaller than other geese, though some very large taxa are known, which rival the swan goose and the black-necked swan in size.

The Eurasian species of black geese have a more coastal distribution compared to the grey geese (genus Anser) which share the same general area of occurrence, not being found far inland even in winter (except for occasional stray birds or individuals escaped from captivity). This does not hold true for the American and Pacific species, in whose ranges grey geese are, for the most part, absent.

== Taxonomy ==
The genus Branta was introduced by the Austrian naturalist Giovanni Antonio Scopoli in 1769. The name is a Latinised form of Old Norse Brandgás meaning burnt as in "burnt (black) goose". The type species is the brant goose (Branta bernicla).

Ottenburghs and colleagues published a study in 2016 that established the phylogenetic relationships between the species.

- Branta
  - Brant (Branta bernicla)
  - - - Red-breasted goose (Branta ruficollis)
      - - Nene (Branta sandvicensis)
        - - Canada goose (Branta canadensis)
          - - Barnacle goose (Branta leucopsis)
            - Cackling goose (Branta hutchinsii)

=== Species list ===
The genus contains six living species.

Genus Branta – Scopoli,, 1769 – six species
Common name	Scientific name and subspecies	Range	Size and ecology	IUCN status and estimated population
Brant (U.S.) or brent goose (U.K.)	Branta bernicla (Linnaeus, 1758) Three subspecies: B. b. nigricans (Lawrence, 1846); B. b. bernicla (Linnaeus, 1758); B. b. hrota (Müller, OF, 1776)	The High Arctic tundra. Circumpolar; several distinct breeding populations, which winter in particular areas (some of which overlap) along the northern temperate zone of the Atlantic and Pacific coastlines. Some resident populations can be found in the United States and Western Europe.	Size: Habitat: Diet:	LC
Red-breasted goose	Branta ruficollis (Pallas, 1769)	Breeds in Arctic Siberia, mainly on the Taymyr Peninsula, with smaller populations in the Gydan and Yamal Peninsulas; wintering on northwestern shores of the Black Sea in Bulgaria, Romania and Ukraine, as well as in Azerbaijan	Size: Habitat: Diet:	VU
Nene, nēnē or Hawaiian goose	Branta sandvicensis (Vigors, 1834)	The Hawaiian Islands	Size: Habitat: Diet:	NT
Canada goose	Branta canadensis (Linnaeus, 1758) Seven subspecies: Atlantic Canada goose (B. c. canadensis) (Linnaeus, 1758); Interior Canada goose (B. c. interior) (Todd, 1938); Giant Canada goose (B. c. maxima) (Delacour, 1951); Moffitt's Canada goose (B. c. moffitti) (Aldrich, 1946); Vancouver Canada goose (B. c. fulva) (Delacour, 1951); Dusky Canada goose (B. c. occidentalis) (Baird, 1858); Lesser Canada goose (B. c. parvipes) (Cassin, 1852)	Temperate regions of North America, introduced populations in Western and Northern Europe, Japan, New Zealand, Chile, Argentina and the Falkland Islands	Size: Habitat: Diet:	LC
Barnacle goose	Branta leucopsis (Bechstein, 1803)	Breeds in Arctic Russia, eastern Greenland and Northern Europe; wintering in Northern and Northwestern Europe	Size: Habitat: Diet:	LC
Cackling goose	Branta hutchinsii (Richardson, 1832) Four or five subspecies: Richardson's cackling goose (B. h. hutchinsii); Aleutian cackling goose (B. h. leucopareia); Small cackling goose (B. h. minima); Taverner's cackling goose (B. h. taverneri); †Bering cackling goose (B. h. asiatica)[disputed]	North America, northern Canada and Alaska	Size: Habitat: Diet:	LC

Two species have been described from subfossil remains found in the Hawaiian Islands, where they became extinct in prehistoric times:

- †Nēnē-nui or wood-walking goose, Branta hylobadistes (prehistoric)

Similar but hitherto undescribed remains are also known from Kauaʻi and Oʻahu.

- †Giant Hawaii goose, Branta rhuax (prehistoric), formerly Geochen rhuax

The relationships of the enigmatic Geochen rhuax, formerly known only from parts of a single bird's skeleton which was damaged due to apparently dying in a lava flow, were long unresolved. After reexamination of the subfossil material and comparisons with other subfossil bones from the island of Hawaiʻi assigned to the genus Branta, it was redescribed as Branta rhuax in 2013. While a presumed relation between B. rhuax and the shelducks, proposed by Lester Short in 1970, has thus been refuted, bones of a shelduck-like bird have been found more recently on Kaua‘i.

Similarly, two bones found on Oʻahu indicate the erstwhile presence of a gigantic waterfowl on this island. Its relationships relative to this genus and those of the moa-nalos, enormous goose-like dabbling ducks, are completely undeterminable at present.

=== Early fossil record ===
Several fossil species of Branta have been described. Since the true geese are hardly distinguishable by anatomical features, the allocation of these to this genus is somewhat uncertain.

- Branta woolfendeni Bickart 1990 (Late Miocene of Arizona, U.S.)
- Branta thessaliensis Boev & Koufos, 2006 (Late Miocene of Perivolaki, Greece)
- Branta dickeyi Miller 1924 (Late Pliocene – Late Pleistocene of Western U.S.)
- Branta esmeralda Burt 1929 (Early Pliocene of Nevada, U.S.)
- Branta howardae Miller 1930 (Early Pliocene of California, U.S.)
- Branta propinqua Shufeldt 1892 (Middle Pleistocene of Fossil Lake, Oregon, U.S.)
- Branta hypsibata (Cope) 1878 (Middle Pleistocene of Fossil Lake, Oregon, U.S.)

The former "Branta" minuscula is now placed with the prehistoric American shelducks, Anabernicula. On the other hand, a goose fossil from the Early to the Middle Pleistocene of El Salvador is highly similar to Anser and, given its age and biogeography, it is likely to belong to either that genus or Branta.
