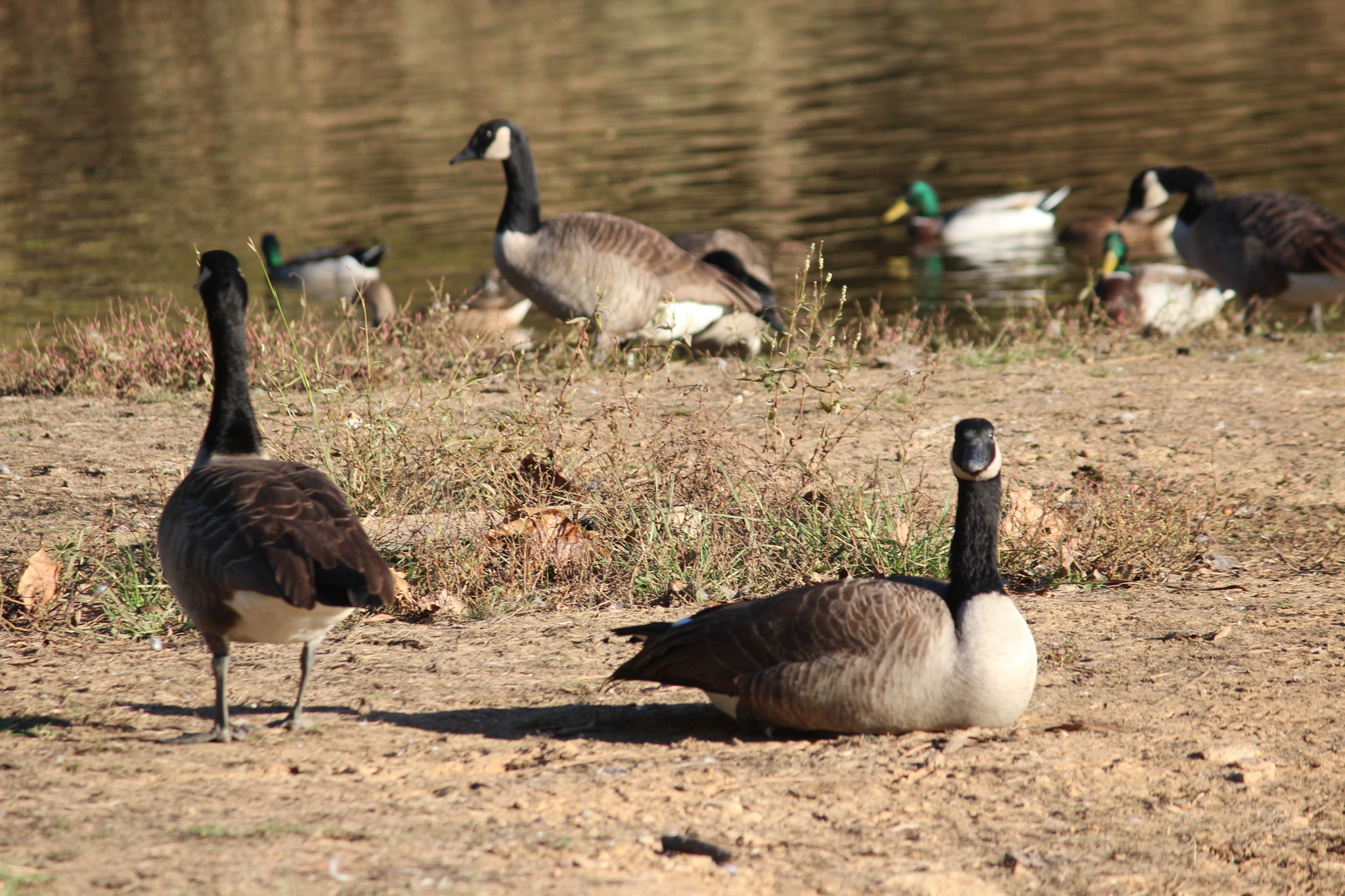
- Call of Canada geese on Brownsea Island, Dorset, March 1966

Scientific classification
- Kingdom: Animalia
- Phylum: Chordata
- Class: Aves
- Order: Anseriformes
- Family: Anatidae
- Genus: Branta
- Species: B. canadensis
- Subspecies: B. c. canadensis

Trinomial name
- Branta canadensis canadensis (Linnaeus, 1758)

= Atlantic Canada goose =

Subspecies of bird

The Atlantic Canada goose (Branta canadensis canadensis) is the nominate subspecies of Canada goose, residing in much of the east coast of North America. It has also been introduced to much of Northern Europe and Western Europe. They are often viewed as pests, especially in places they have been introduced to. The Canada goose was first described by Carl Linnaeus in 1758.

== Description ==
The Atlantic Canada goose is characterized as having a medium grey chest and warm brown wings and flanks. It ranges in length from 90 to 100 cm (3 to 3.2 ft) and has a wingspan of 160 to 185 cm (5.2 to 6.1 ft). Sexual dimorphism is minimal, though males tend to be heavier ranging from 3.5 to 6.5 kg (7.7 to 14.3 lbs) while females range from 3 to 5.5 kg (6.6 to 12.1 lbs).

== Distribution ==
The native range of the Atlantic Canada goose is the east coast of North America. These birds summer in eastern Labrador, Newfoundland, and various islands in the Gulf of St. Lawrence and winter in much of the eastern United States, as far south as North Carolina. The bird has been introduced farther south in the United States where it has become a resident. These birds were first introduced to Europe in 1665 in the waterfowl collection of King Charles II of England. Later, this bird was intentionally released into the wild in order to provide hunting opportunities. It is now known to reside in Iceland, Ireland, UK, France, Germany, Denmark, Poland, Lithuania, Latvia, Estonia, Sweden, Norway, and European Russia.

== Breeding ==
The breeding season lasts from April to June. Nests are located in grass near water in a raised location. Both the male and female guard the nest prior to nesting, at which point only the male will guard the nest. Average clutch size varies between four and six eggs. Young fledge at around 28 days old.
