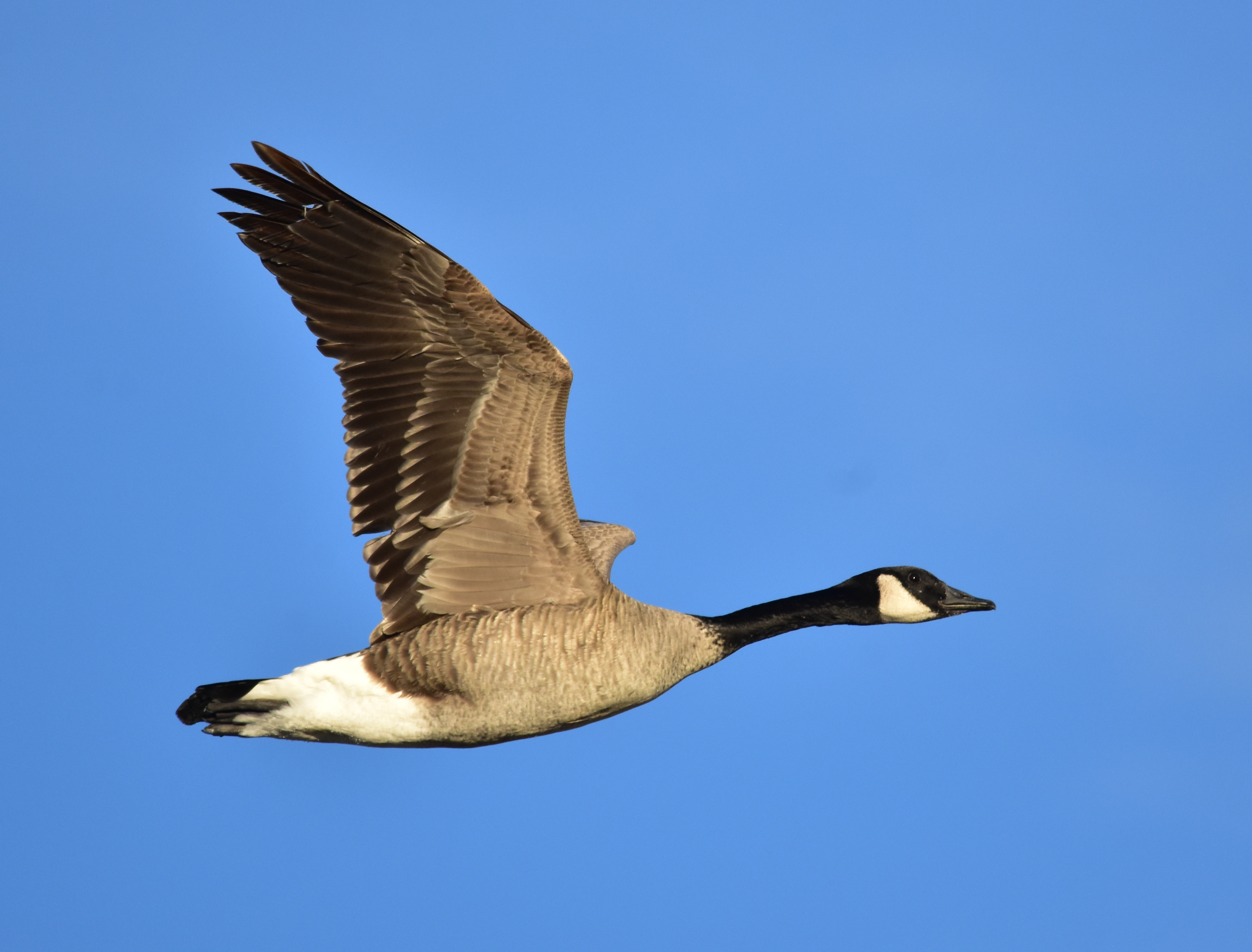
- At Seedskadee National Wildlife Refuge

Conservation status
- Least Concern (IUCN 3.1)

Scientific classification
- Kingdom: Animalia
- Phylum: Chordata
- Class: Aves
- Order: Anseriformes
- Family: Anatidae
- Genus: Branta
- Species: B. canadensis

Binomial name
- Branta canadensis (Linnaeus, 1758)

Subspecies
- B. c. occidentalis; B. c. fulva; B. c. parvipes; B. c. moffitti; B. c. maxima; B. c. interior; B. c. canadensis
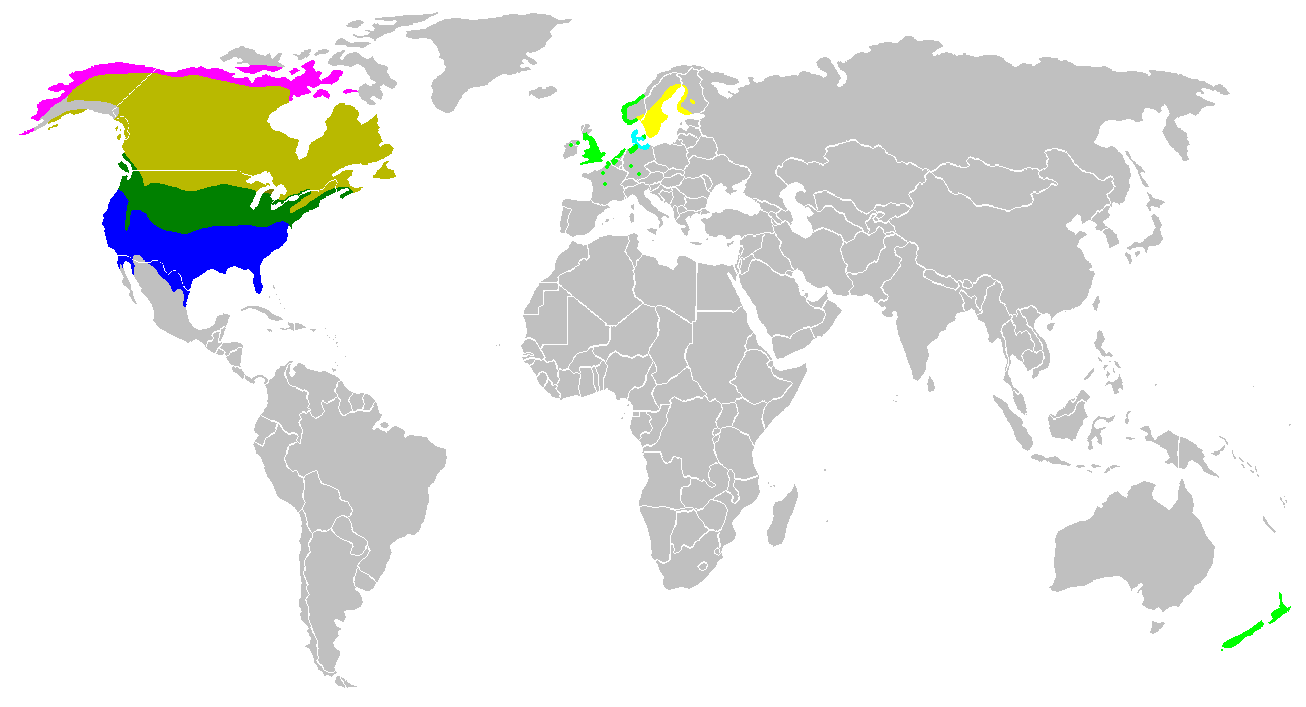
- Canada goose distribution: Summer range (native) Year-round range (native) Wintering range (native) Summer range (introduced) Year-round range (introduced) Wintering range (introduced) Summer range (cackling goose)

Synonyms
- Anas canadensis Linnaeus, 1758

Audio
- Call of Canada geese on Brownsea Island, Dorset, March 1966

= Canada goose =

Canada goose Temporal range: Pleistocene–present

Species of goose native to the Northern Hemisphere

The Canada goose (Branta canadensis) is a large species of goose with a black head and neck, white cheeks, white under its chin, and a brown body. It is native to the Arctic and temperate regions of North America, and it is occasionally found during migration across the Atlantic in northern Europe. It has been introduced to France, the United Kingdom, Ireland, Scandinavia, New Zealand, Japan, Chile, Argentina, and the Falkland Islands. Like most geese, the Canada goose is primarily herbivorous and normally migratory; often found on or close to fresh water, the Canada goose is also common in brackish marshes, estuaries, and lagoons.

Adept at living in human-altered areas, Canada geese have established breeding colonies in urban and cultivated habitats, which provide food and have few natural predators. The success of this common park species has led to it often being considered a pest species. This is because of its excrement, its depredation of crops, its noise, its aggressive territorial behavior toward both humans and other animals, and its habit of stalking and begging for food. The last is a result of humans not following artificial feeding policies toward wild animals.

== Nomenclature and taxonomy ==
The Canada goose was one of the many species described by Carl Linnaeus in his 18th-century work Systema Naturae. It belongs to the Branta genus of geese, which contains species with largely black plumage, distinguishing them from the gray species of the genus Anser.

=== Etymology ===
Branta was a Latinized form of Old Norse Brandgás, "burnt (black) goose" and the specific epithet canadensis is a Neo-Latin word meaning "from Canada". According to the Oxford English Dictionary, the first citation for the 'Canada goose' dates back to 1772. The Canada goose is also colloquially referred to as the "Canadian goose".

=== Subspecies ===
The AOU has divided the many subspecies between the two species. The subspecies of the Canada goose were listed as:

- Atlantic Canada goose (B. c. canadensis) (Linnaeus, 1758)
- Interior Canada goose (B. c. interior) (Todd, 1938)
- Giant Canada goose (B. c. maxima) (Delacour, 1951)
- Moffitt's Canada goose (B. c. moffitti) (Aldrich, 1946)
- Vancouver Canada goose (B. c. fulva) (Delacour, 1951)
- Dusky Canada goose (B. c. occidentalis) (Baird, 1858)
- Lesser Canada goose (B. c. parvipes) (Cassin, 1852)

==== Relation to the cackling goose ====
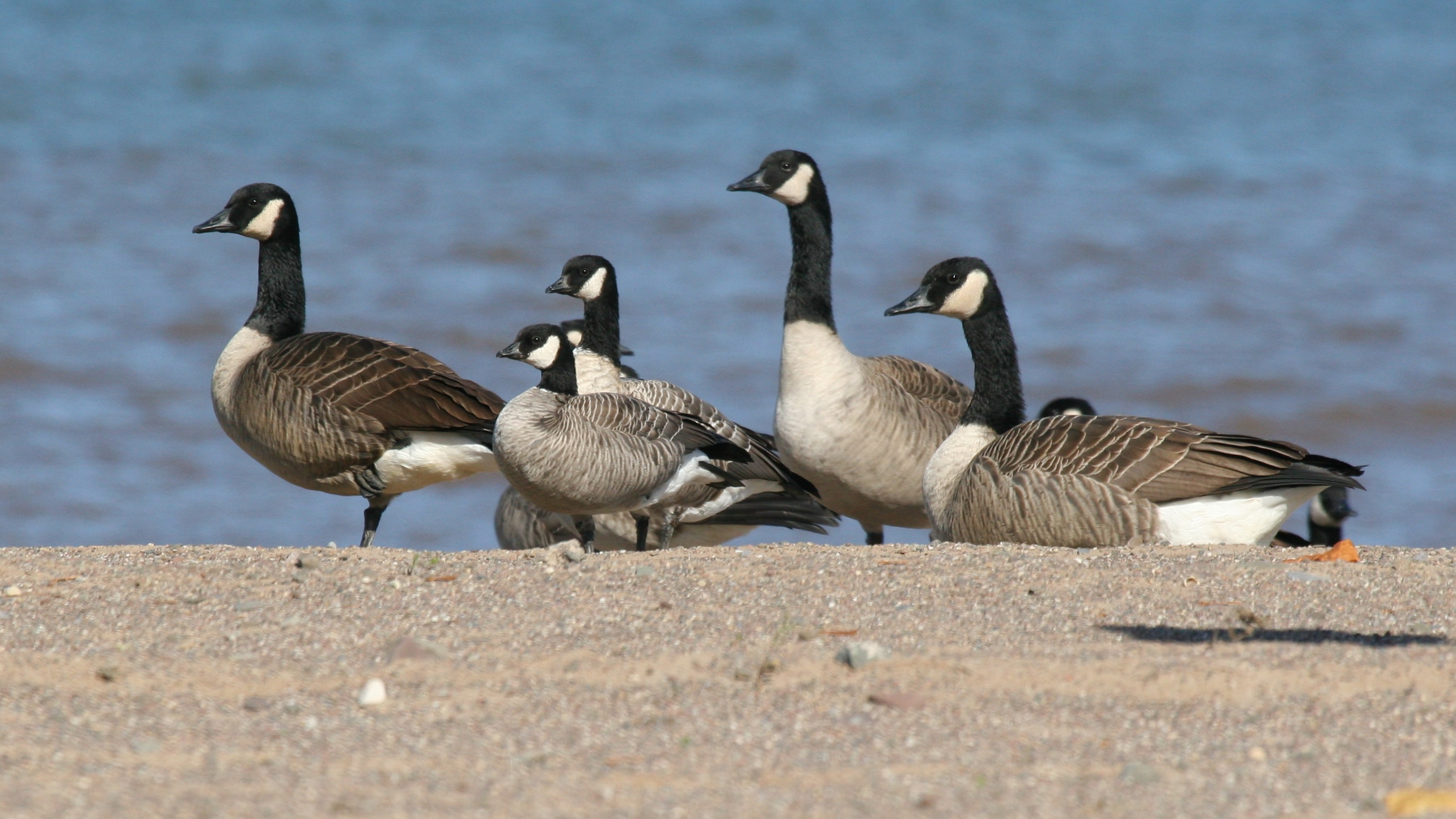
A mixed group of Canada geese and cackling geese

The cackling goose was originally considered to be the same species or several subspecies of the Canada goose. But in July 2004, the American Ornithologists' Union's Committee on Classification and Nomenclature split them into two species, making the cackling goose into a full species with the scientific name Branta hutchinsii. The British Ornithologists' Union followed suit in June 2005.

The distinctions between the Canada geese and cackling geese have led to confusion and debate among ornithologists. This has been aggravated by the overlap between the small types of Canada goose and larger types of cackling goose. The old "lesser Canada geese" were believed to be a partly hybrid population, with the birds named B. c. taverneri considered a mixture of B. c. minima, B. c. occidentalis, and B. c. parvipes. The holotype specimen of taverneri is a straightforward large pale cackling goose however, and hence the taxon is still valid today and was renamed "Taverner's cackling goose".

In addition, the barnacle goose (B. leucopsis) was determined to be a derivative of the cackling goose lineage, whereas the Nene (B. sandvicensis) originated from ancestral Canada geese. Thus, the species' distinctness is well evidenced. Ornithologist Harold C. Hanson, who had rediscovered wild populations of the Giant Canada Goose, proposed splitting Canada and cackling goose into six species and 200 subspecies. The radical nature of this proposal has been controversial; Richard Banks of the AOU urges caution before any of Hanson's proposals are accepted. The International Code of Zoological Nomenclature has suppressed Hanson's proposals, based on the criticisms of Banks and other ornithologists.

== Description ==
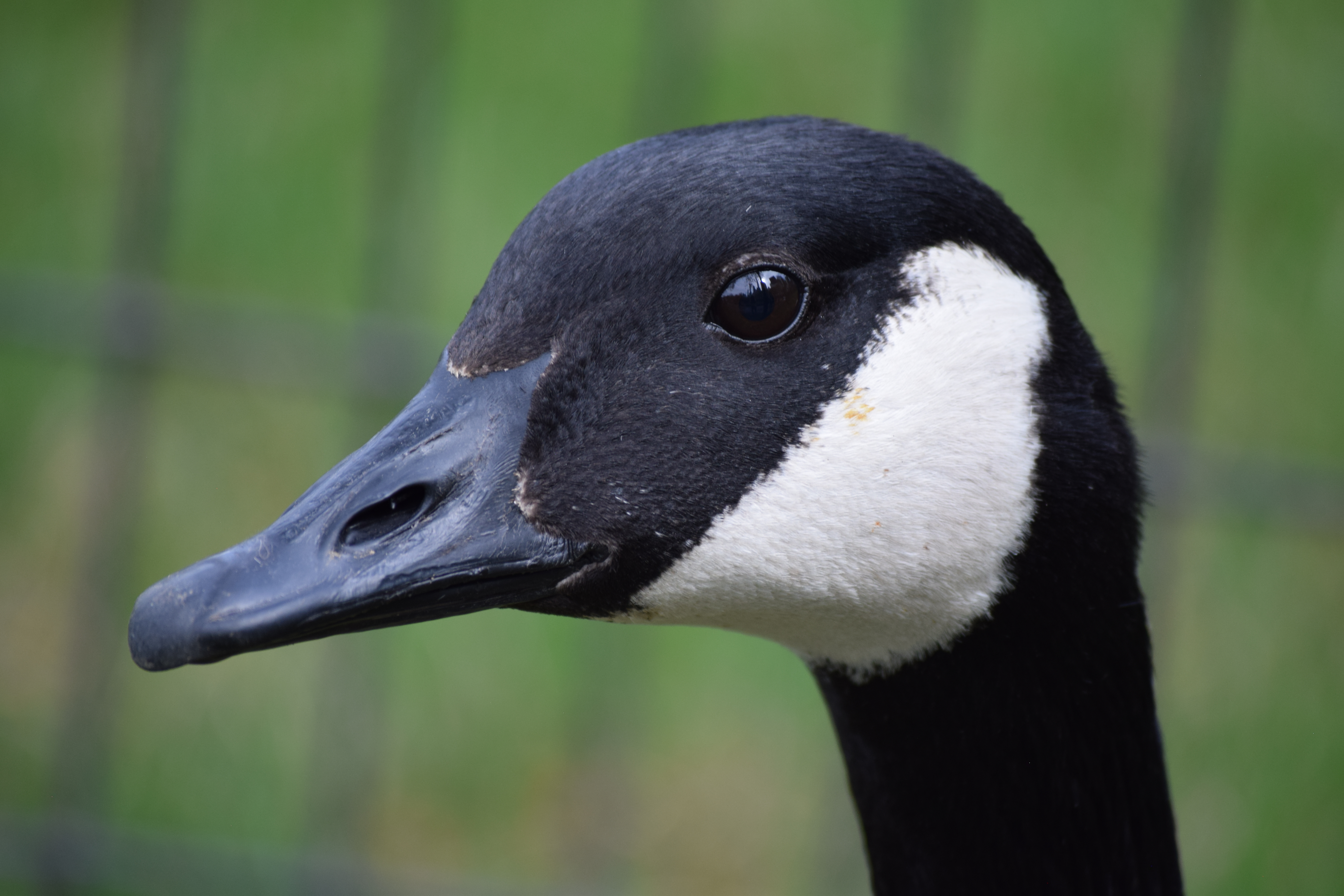
Profile view of the head

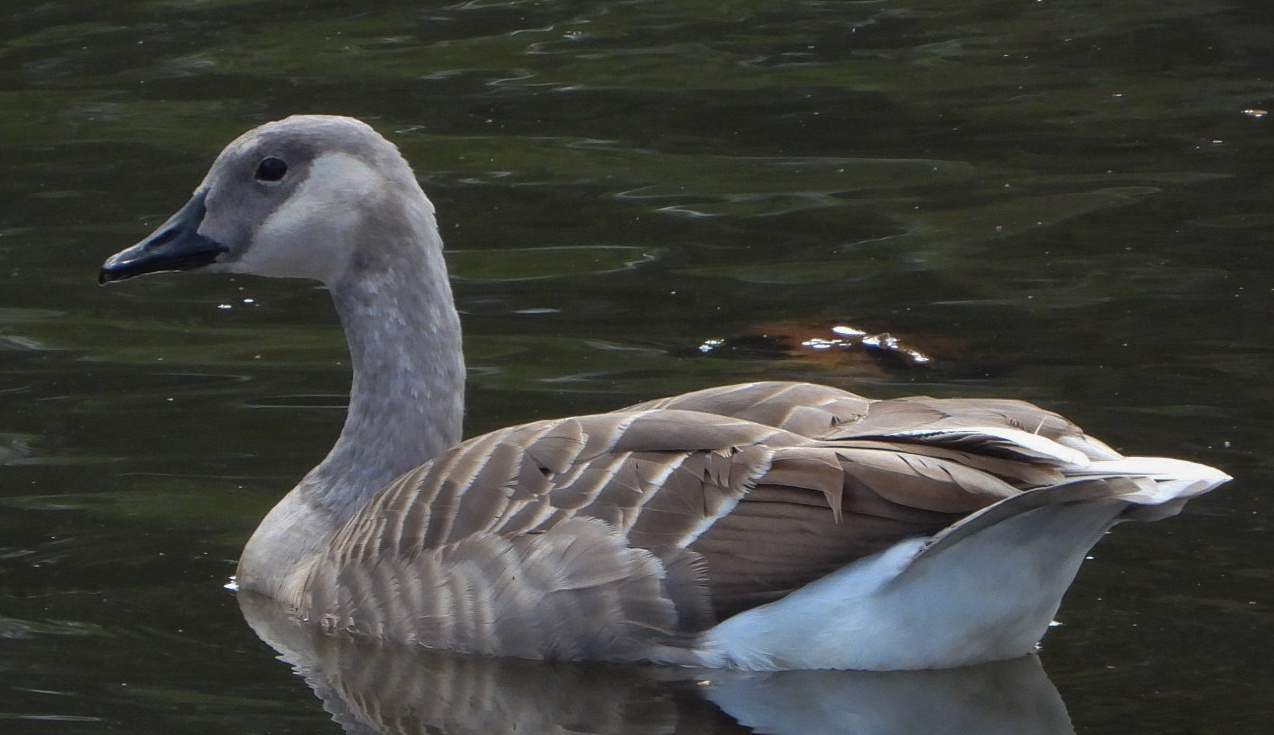
A Canada goose with leucism, exhibiting paler plumage than normal

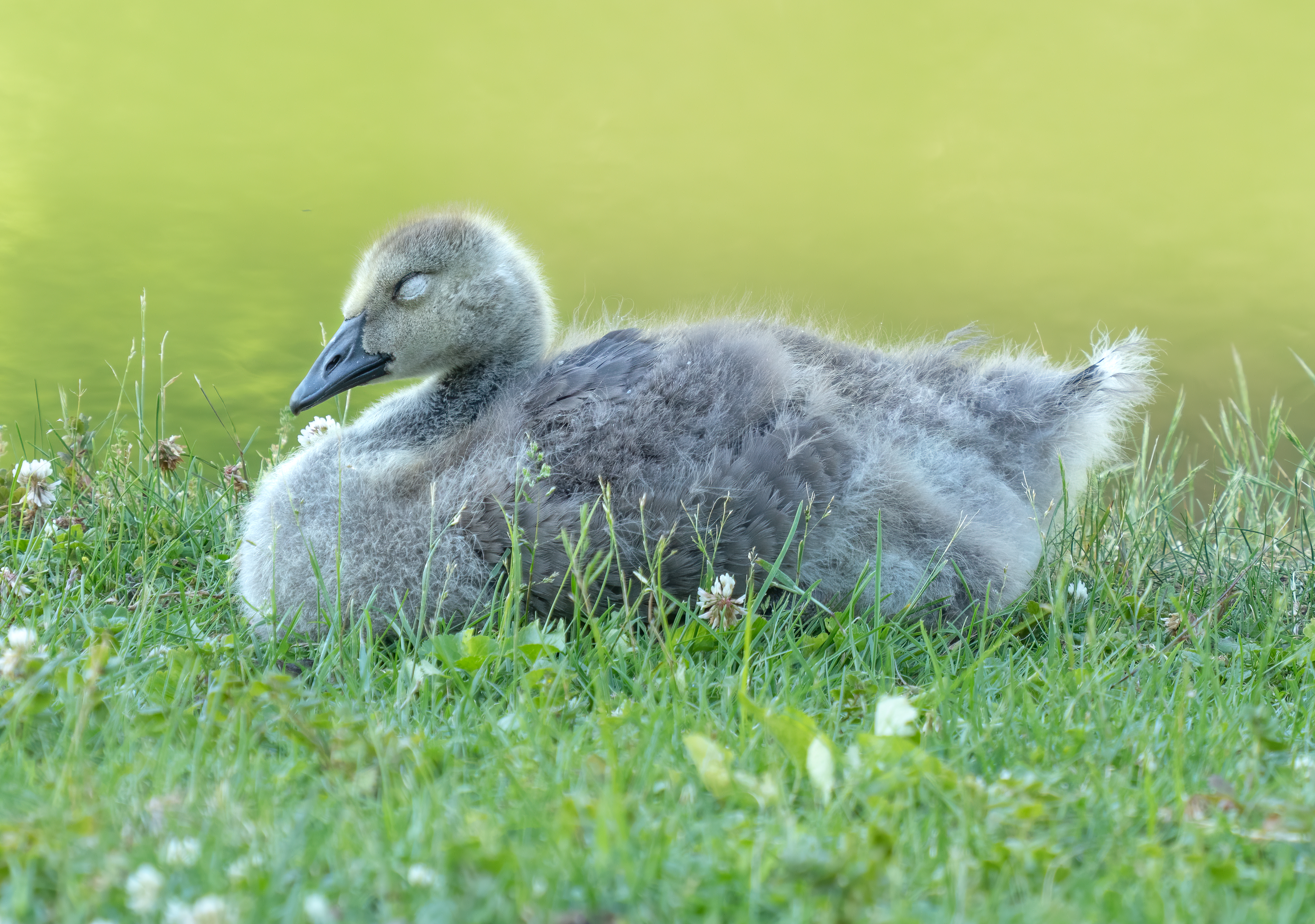
Gosling resting in the grass of a New York cemetery

Vocalizations

A flock calling when feeding

Low flyover by five Canada geese

Calling

The black head and neck with a white "chinstrap" distinguish the Canada goose from all other goose species except the cackling goose and barnacle goose. (The latter, however, has a black breast and gray rather than brownish body plumage.) Some Canada geese come with a pepper-spotted or brown neck with brown plumage, and these are assumed to be a leucistic variety. On occasion, individuals with dark cheeks, white foreheads or white necks may be seen.

The seven subspecies of this bird vary widely in size and plumage details but all are recognizable as Canada geese. Some of the smaller subspecies can be hard to distinguish from the cackling goose, which slightly overlap in mass. However most subspecies of the cackling goose (exclusive of Richardson's cackling goose, B. h. hutchinsii) are considerably smaller. The smallest cackling goose, B. h. minima, is scarcely larger than a mallard. In addition to the size difference, cackling geese also have a shorter neck and smaller bill, which can be useful when small Canada geese comingle with relatively large cackling geese. Of the "true geese" (i.e. the genera Anser and Branta), the Canada goose is on average the largest living species, although some other species that are geese in name, if not of close relation to these genera, are on average heavier, such as the spur-winged goose and Cape Barren goose.

Canada geese range from 75 to 110 cm (30 to 43 in) in length and have a 127–185 cm (50–73 in) wingspan. Among standard measurements, the wing chord can range from 39 to 55 cm (15 1/2 to 21 1/2 in), the tarsus can range from 6.9 to 10.6 cm (2 11/16 to 4 3/16 in) and the bill can range from 4.1 to 6.8 cm (1 5/8 to 2 11/16 in). The largest subspecies is B. c. maxima, or the giant Canada goose, and the smallest (with the separation of the cackling goose group) is B. c. parvipes, or the lesser Canada goose. An exceptionally large male of subspecies B. c. maxima, which rarely exceed 8 kg (18 lb), weighed 10.9 kg (24 lb) and had a wingspan of 2.24 m (7 ft 4 in). This specimen is the largest wild goose ever recorded of any species.

The male Canada goose usually weighs 2.6–6.5 kg (5 3/4–14 1/4 lb), averaging amongst all subspecies 3.9 kg (8 1/2 lb). The female looks virtually identical but is slightly lighter at 2.4–5.5 kg (5 1/4–12 1/4 lb), averaging amongst all subspecies 3.6 kg (8 lb), and generally 10% smaller in linear dimensions than the male counterparts. The honk refers to the call of the male Canada goose, whilst the hrink call refers to the female goose. The calls are similar but the hrink is shorter and higher pitched than the honk of males. When agitated or aggressively defending territory, Canada geese will typically initiate an encounter with a high-pitched hiss. Canada geese communicate with ten different vocalizations, each in response to a different situation confronting them.

== Distribution and habitat ==
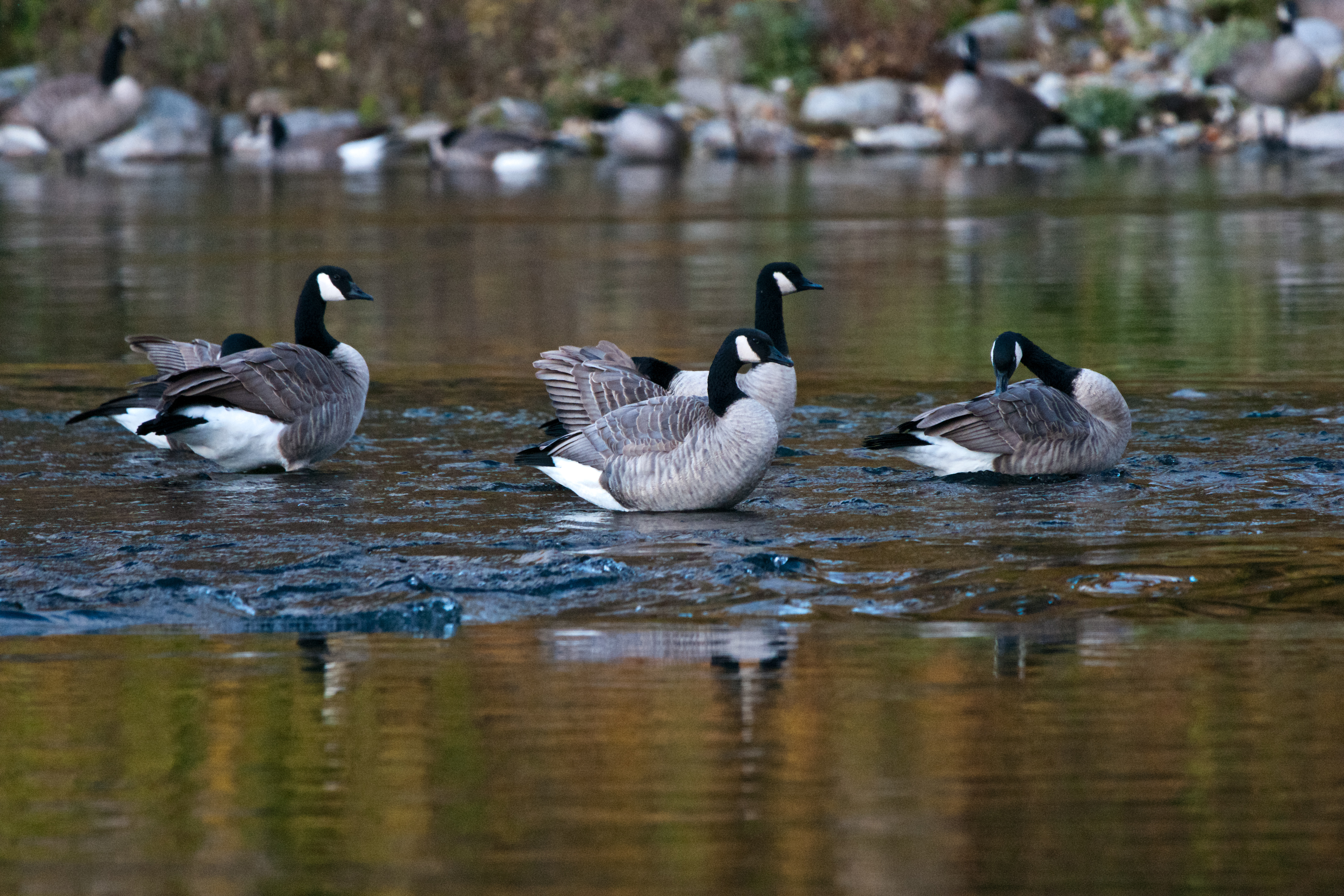
On Spokane River, Washington state

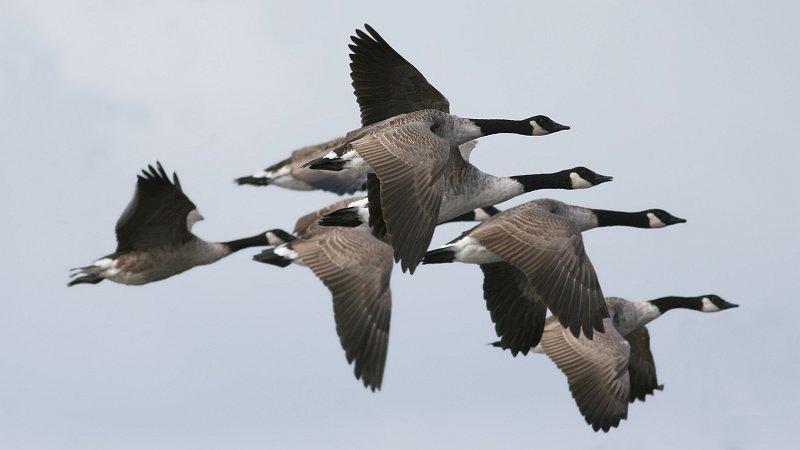
Flock in flight

This species is native to North America. It breeds in Canada and the northern United States in a wide range of habitats. The Great Lakes region maintains a large population of Canada geese. Canada geese live year-round in the southern part of their breeding range, including the northern half of the United States' eastern seaboard and Pacific Coast, and areas in between. Between California and South Carolina in the southern United States and in northern Mexico, Canada geese are mainly present as migrants from further north during the winter.

By the early 20th century, overhunting and loss of habitat in the late 19th and early 20th centuries had resulted in a serious decline in the numbers of this bird in its native range. The giant Canada goose subspecies was believed to be extinct in the 1950s until, in 1962, a small flock was discovered wintering in Rochester, Minnesota, by Harold Hanson of the Illinois Natural History Survey.

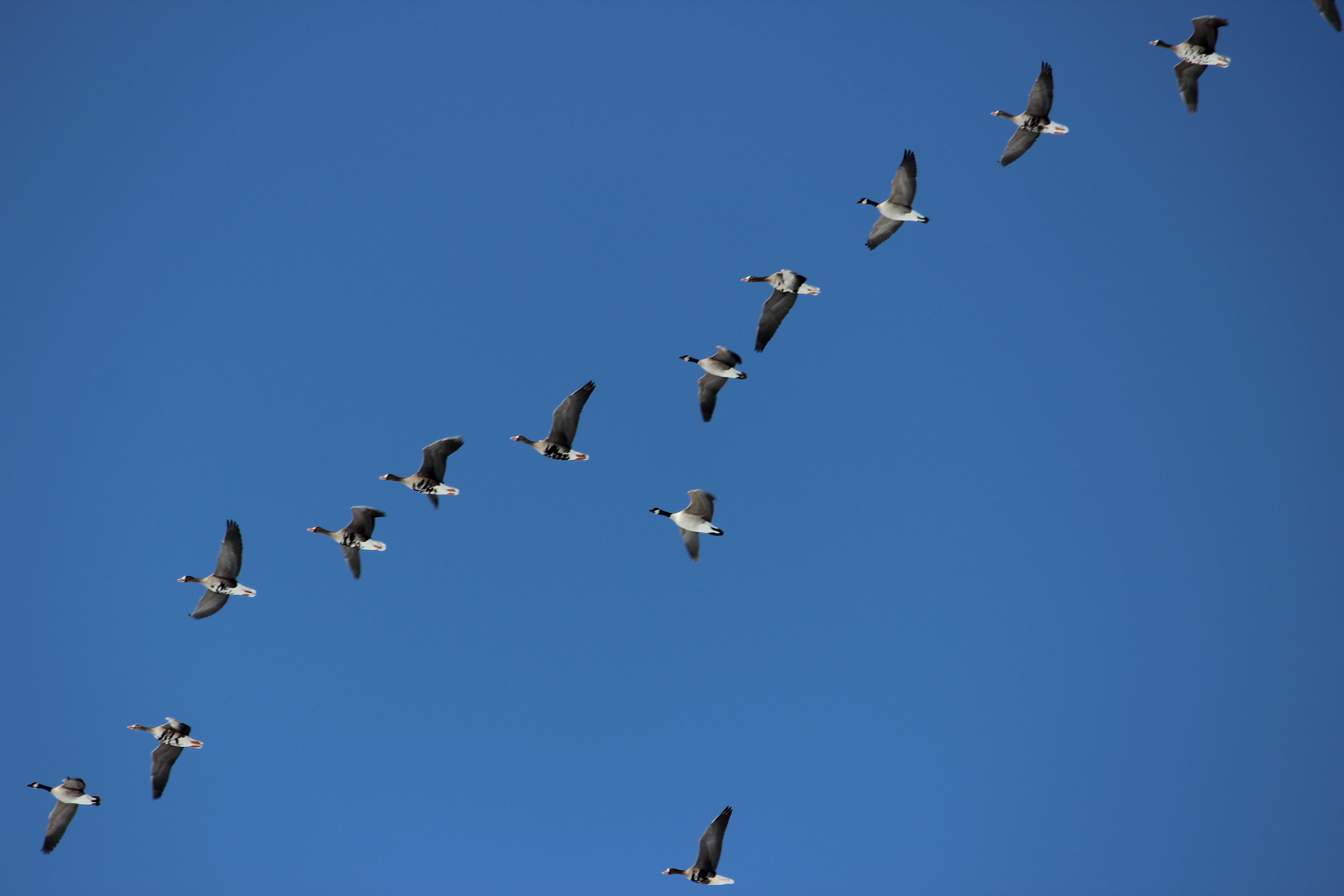
Mixed flock of Canada and greater white-fronted geese, in Kulm Wetland Management District

In 1964, the Northern Prairie Wildlife Research Center was built near Jamestown, North Dakota. Its first director, Harvey K. Nelson, talked Forrest Lee into leaving Minnesota to head the center's Canada goose production and restoration program. Forrest soon had 64 pens with 64 breeding pairs of screened, high-quality birds. The project involved private, state, and federal resources and relied on the expertise and cooperation of many individuals. By the end of 1981, more than 6,000 giant Canada geese had been released at 83 sites in 26 counties in North Dakota.

In recent years, Canada goose populations in some areas have grown substantially, so much so that many consider them pests for their droppings, bacteria in their droppings, noise, and confrontational behavior. This problem is partially due to the removal of natural predators and an abundance of safe, human-made bodies of water near food sources, such as those found on golf courses, in public parks and beaches, on sports fields, and in planned communities. Due in part to the interbreeding of various migratory subspecies with the introduced non-migratory giant subspecies, Canada geese are frequently a year-round feature of such urban environments.

Contrary to its normal migration routine, large flocks of Canada geese have established permanent residence along the Pacific coast of North America from British Columbia's Lower Mainland and Vancouver Island area south to the San Francisco Bay area of Northern California. There are also resident Atlantic coast populations, such as on Chesapeake Bay, in Virginia's James River regions, and in the Triangle area of North Carolina (Raleigh, Durham, Chapel Hill), and nearby Hillsborough. Some Canada geese have taken up permanent residence as far south as Florida, in places such as retention ponds in apartment complexes.

In 2015, the Ohio population of Canada geese was reported as roughly 130,000, with the number likely to continue increasing. Many of the geese, previously migratory, reportedly had become native, remaining in the state even in the summer. The increase was attributed to a lack of natural predators, an abundance of water, and plentiful grass in manicured lawns in urban areas. Canada geese were eliminated in Ohio following the American Civil War but were reintroduced in 1956 with 10 pairs. The population was estimated at 18,000 in 1979. The geese are considered protected, though a hunting season is allowed in September. The Ohio Department of Natural Resources recommends several non-lethal scare and hazing tactics for nuisance geese, but if such methods have been used without success, they may issue a permit to destroy nests, conduct a goose roundup or exterminate geese.

=== Outside North America ===
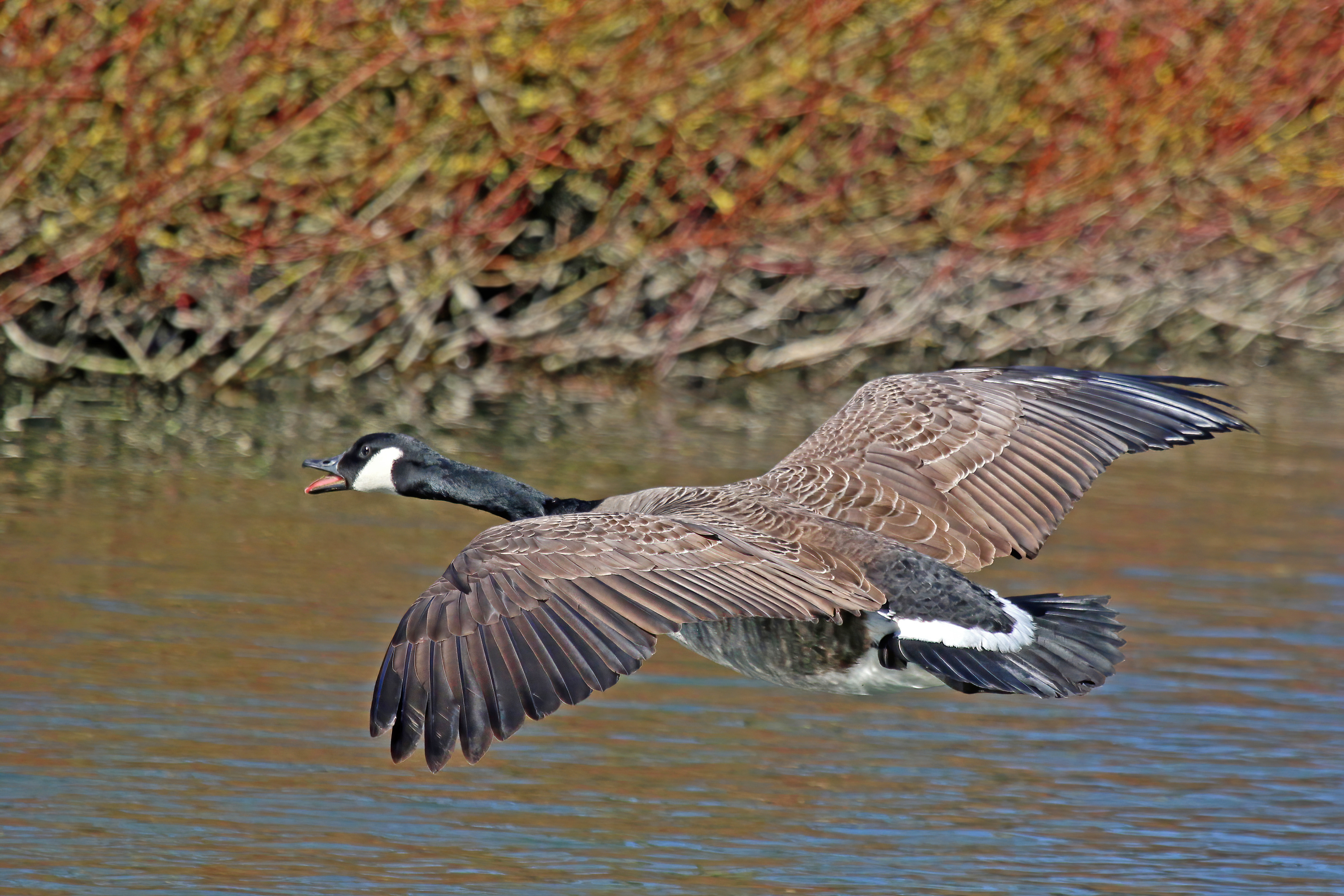
In flight at Blenheim Palace, Oxfordshire

==== Eurasia ====
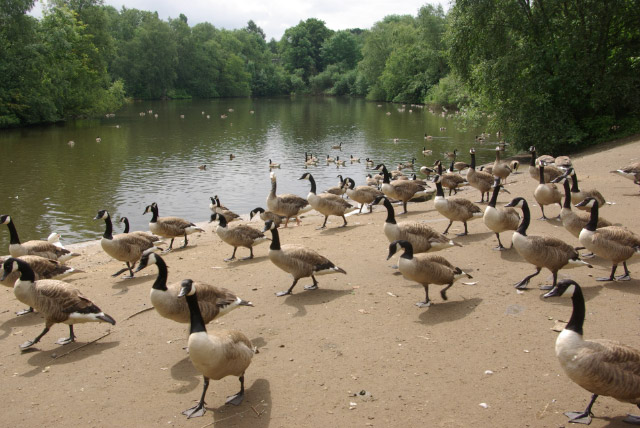
Approaching to beg for food in a Manchester park, a learned behavior

Canada geese have reached Northern Europe naturally, which has been confirmed by ringing recoveries. The birds include those of the subspecies B. c. parvipes, and possibly others. These geese are also found naturally on the Kamchatka Peninsula in eastern Siberia, and eastern China.

Canada geese were also introduced into Europe in the early 17th century by explorer Samuel de Champlain, who sent several pairs to France as a present for King Louis XIII. The geese were introduced into Great Britain in the late 17th century as an addition to King James II's waterfowl collection in St James's Park. By the middle of the 18th century Canada geese had established populations in France and Great Britain and also in Ireland. They were also introduced into the Netherlands, Belgium, Germany, Scandinavia, and Finland in the 20th Century, starting in Sweden in 1929. Most European populations are not migratory but those in more northerly parts of Sweden and Finland migrate to the North Sea and Baltic coasts.

Semi-tame feral birds are common in parks and have become a pest in some areas. In Great Britain Canada geese were originally introduced as a decorative and game bird in the 17th century on numerous country estates but remained uncommon until the mid-20th century. In 1953 the population in the British Isles was estimated at 2,670–3,482 by the British Trust for Ornithology and at a minimum of 10,090 by the Wildfowl Trust. At this time, colonies occurred mainly in the parks and lakes of individual estates; over the 1970s, however, the geese began to spread into bodies of water and wetlands throughout the countryside. Their population grew to an estimated 60–64,000 in 1990 and 82,000 in 1999 as changing agricultural practices and urban growth provided new habitat, with an estimated 165,000 wintering individuals in 2017.

An attempt to translocate breeding pairs away from agricultural zones in the 1950s and 1960s backfired, causing establishment of new subpopulations and an overall population explosion. The British populations are most concentrated in South East England and the Midlands but have spread from there into moorlands, upland waters and human-occupied areas. The species' spread and naturalization are due to the lack of competing animals in its ecological niche as a large aquatic bird that favors parks and open woodlands, since the only significant competitor to it is the mute swan, alongside the creation of favorable breeding areas through the establishment of reservoirs and flooded gravel pits and the introduced populations losing their instinct to migrate.

Ecologically, Canada geese have been observed to drive away native ducks and swans from nesting areas due to the press of their greater numbers, and to overgraze the shoots and rhizomes of aquatic plants. Their droppings also contribute to eutrophication in water. They are also considered to be a potential agricultural and park pest due to their heavy grazing of vegetation. While adult birds lack predators outside of humans, goslings and eggs are taken by European mink, Eurasian otter, and mute swans.

European birds are mostly descended from the nominate subspecies B. c. canadensis, likely with some contributions from the subspecies B. c. maxima.

==== New Zealand ====
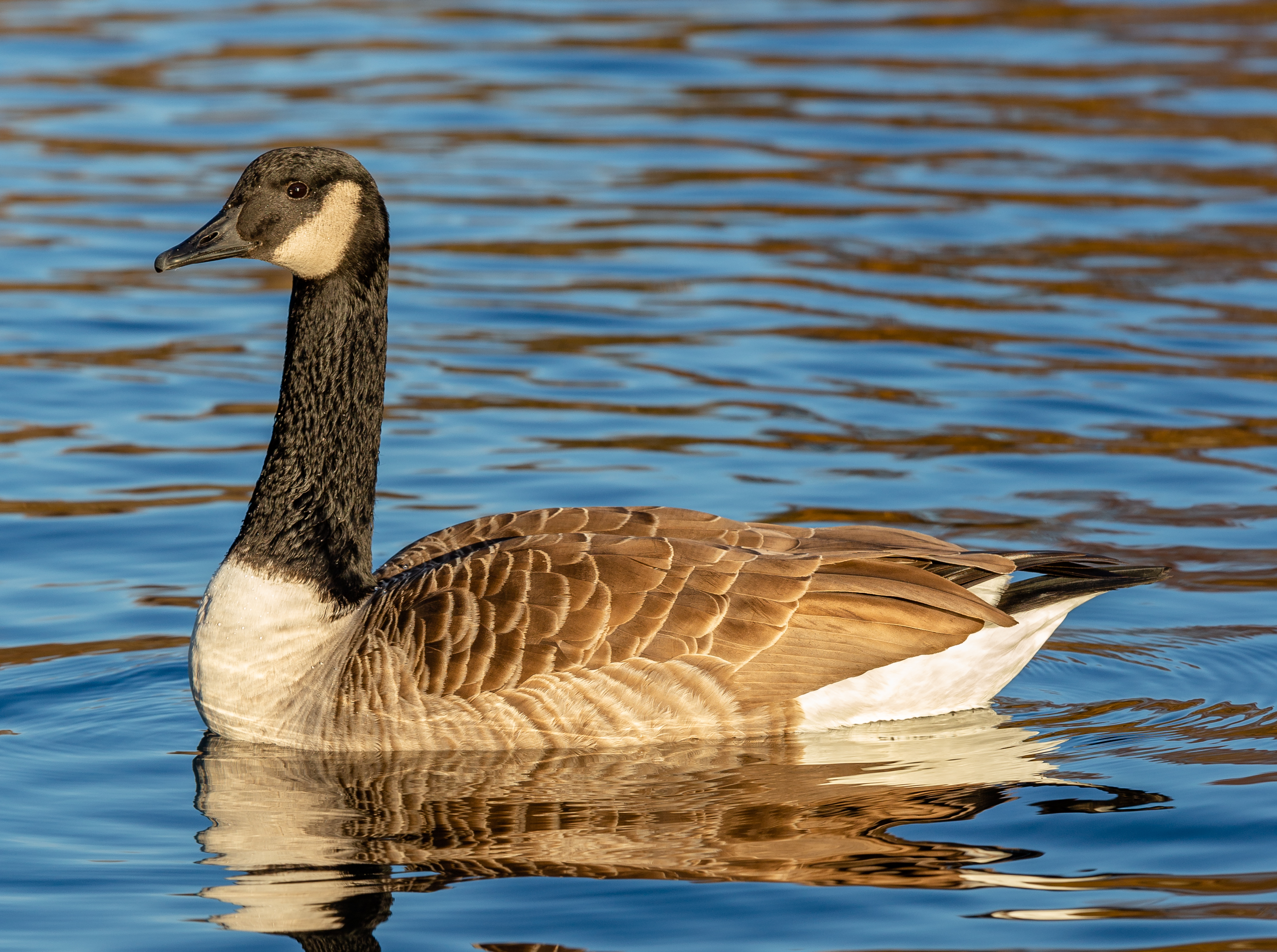
In New Zealand

Canada geese were introduced as a game bird into New Zealand in 1905. They have become a problem in some areas by fouling pastures and damaging crops. They were protected under the Wildlife Act 1953 and the population was managed by Fish and Game New Zealand, which culled excessive bird numbers. In 2011, the government removed the protection status, allowing anyone to kill the birds.

== Behavior ==
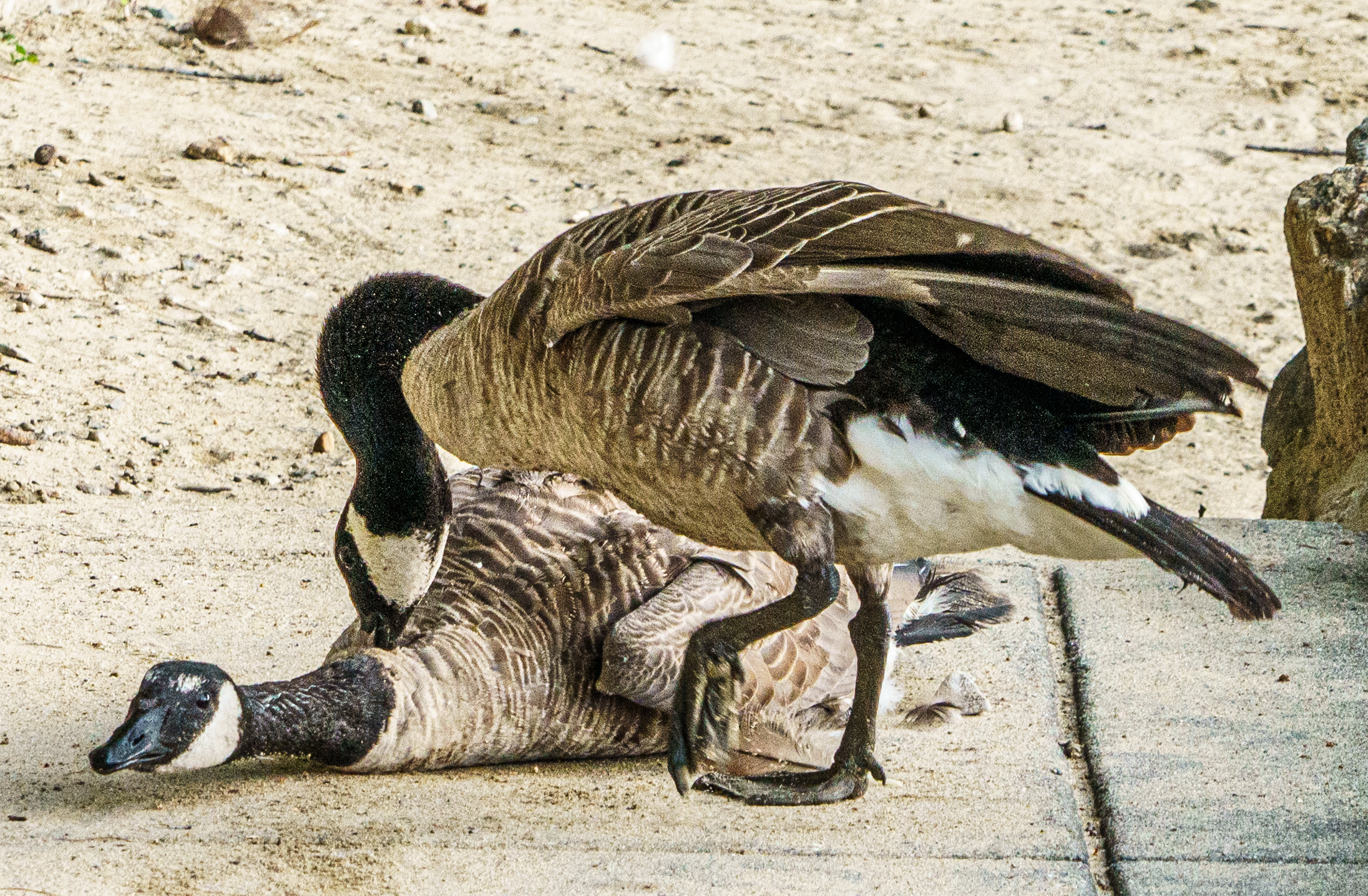
Fighting

Like most geese, the Canada goose is naturally migratory with the wintering range being most of the United States. The calls overhead from large groups of Canada geese flying in a V-shaped formation signal the transitions into spring and autumn. In some areas, migration routes have changed due to changes in habitat and food sources. In mild climates from southwestern British Columbia to California to the Great Lakes, some of the population has become nonmigratory due to adequate winter food supply and a lack of former predators.

Males exhibit agonistic behavior both on and off breeding and nesting grounds. This behavior rarely involves interspecific killing. One documented case involved a male defending his nest from a brant that wandered into the area; the following attack lasted for one hour until the death of the brant. The cause of death was suffocation or drowning in mud as a direct result of the Canada goose's pecking the head of the brant into the mud. Researchers attributed it to high hormone levels and the brant's inability to leave the nesting area.

=== Diet ===
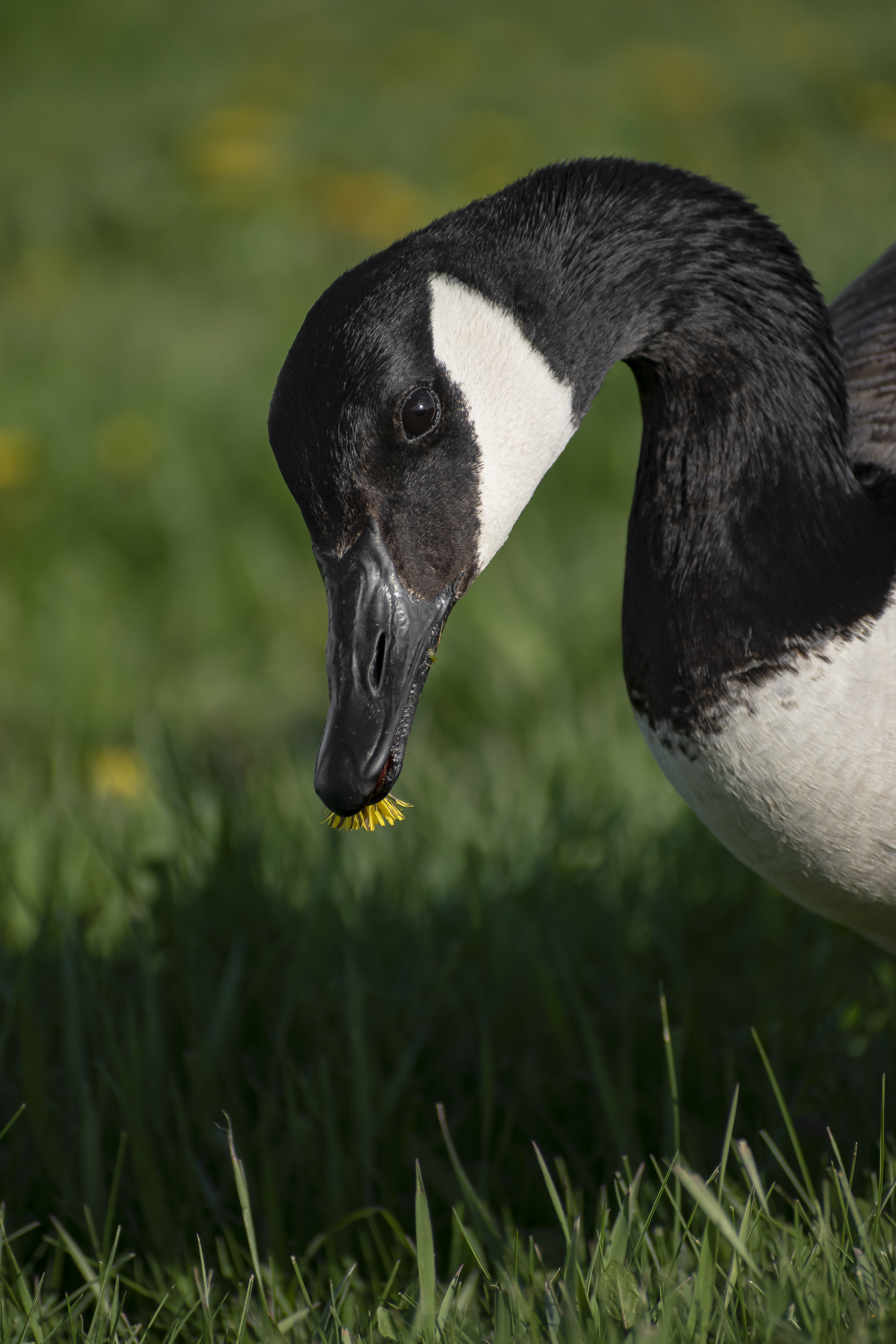
Eating a flower at Downsview Park, Ontario

Canada geese are primarily herbivores, although they sometimes eat small insects and fish. Their diet includes green vegetation and grains. The Canada goose eats a variety of grasses when on land. It feeds by grasping a blade of grass with the bill, then tearing it with a jerk of the head. The Canada goose also eats beans and grains such as wheat, rice, and corn when they are available. In the water, it feeds from aquatic plants by sliding its bill at the bottom of the body of water. It also feeds on aquatic plant-like algae, such as seaweed.

In urban areas, it is also known to pick food out of garbage bins. They are also sometimes hand-fed a variety of grains and other foods by humans in parks. Canada geese prefer lawn grass in urban areas. They usually graze in open areas with wide clearance to avoid potential predators.

=== Reproduction ===
During the second year of their lives, Canada geese find a mate. They are monogamous, and most couples stay together all of their lives. If one dies, the other may find a new mate. The female lays from two to nine eggs with an average of five, and both parents protect the nest while the eggs incubate, but the female spends more time at the nest than the male.

Mating ritual between two Canada geese

Its nest is usually located in an elevated area near water such as streams, lakes, ponds, and sometimes on a beaver lodge. Its eggs are laid in a shallow depression lined with plant material and down.

The incubation period, in which the female incubates while the male remains nearby, lasts for 24–32 days after laying. Canada geese can respond to external climatic factors by adjusting their laying date to spring maximum temperatures, which may benefit their nesting success. As the annual summer molt also takes place during the breeding season, the adults lose their flight feathers for 20–40 days, regaining flight about the same time as their goslings start to fly.

As soon as the goslings hatch, they are immediately capable of walking, swimming, and finding their own food (a diet similar to that of adult geese). Parents are often seen leading their goslings in a line, usually with one adult at the front and the other at the back. While protecting their goslings, parents often violently chase away nearby creatures, from small blackbirds to lone humans who approach: first giving a warning hiss, and then attacking with bites and slaps of the wings. Although parents are hostile to unfamiliar geese, they may form groups of a number of goslings and a few adults, called crèches.

The offspring enter the fledgling stage any time from six to nine weeks of age. They do not leave their parents until after the spring migration, when they return to their birthplace.

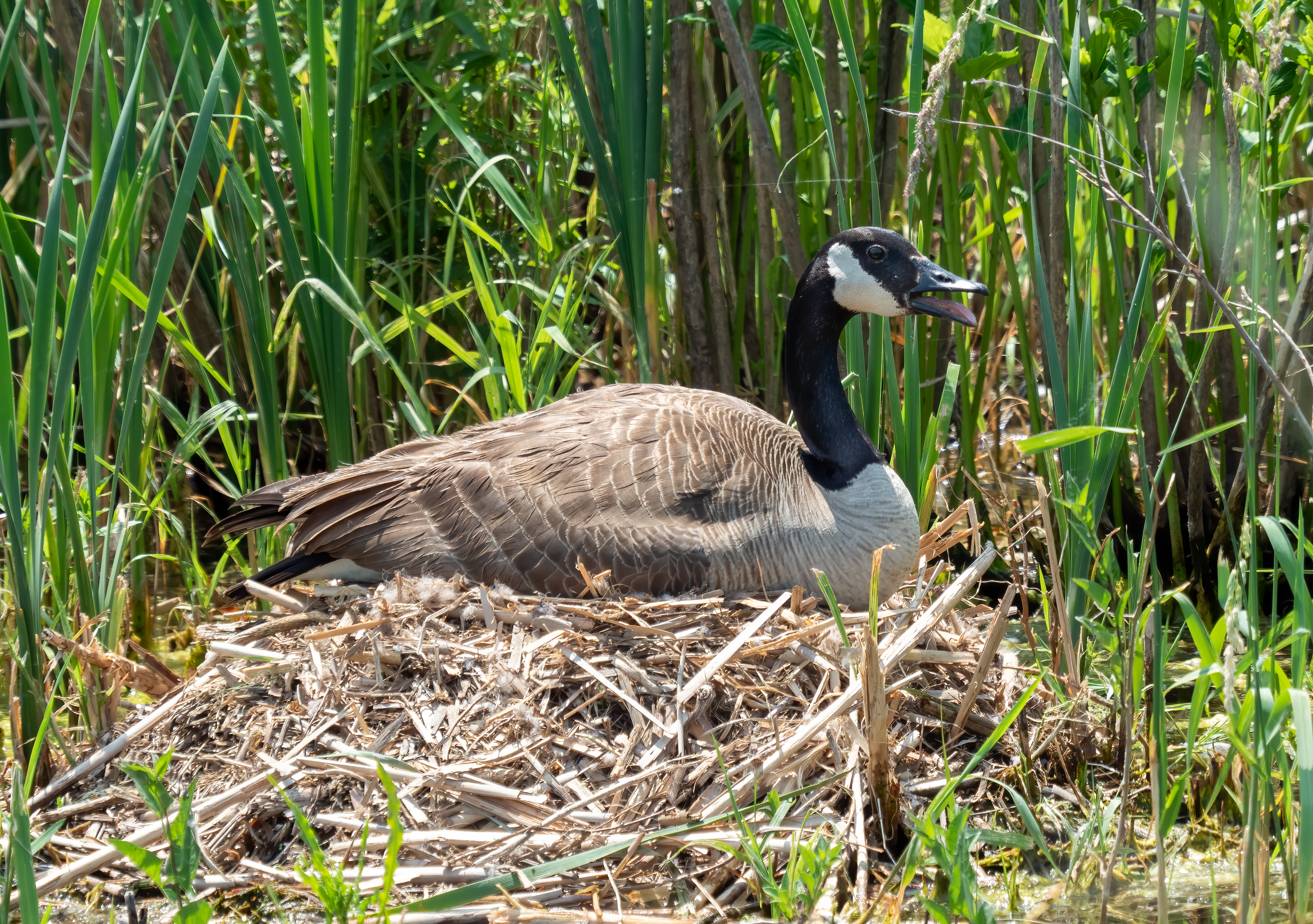
On a nest, at the Montezuma National Wildlife Refuge

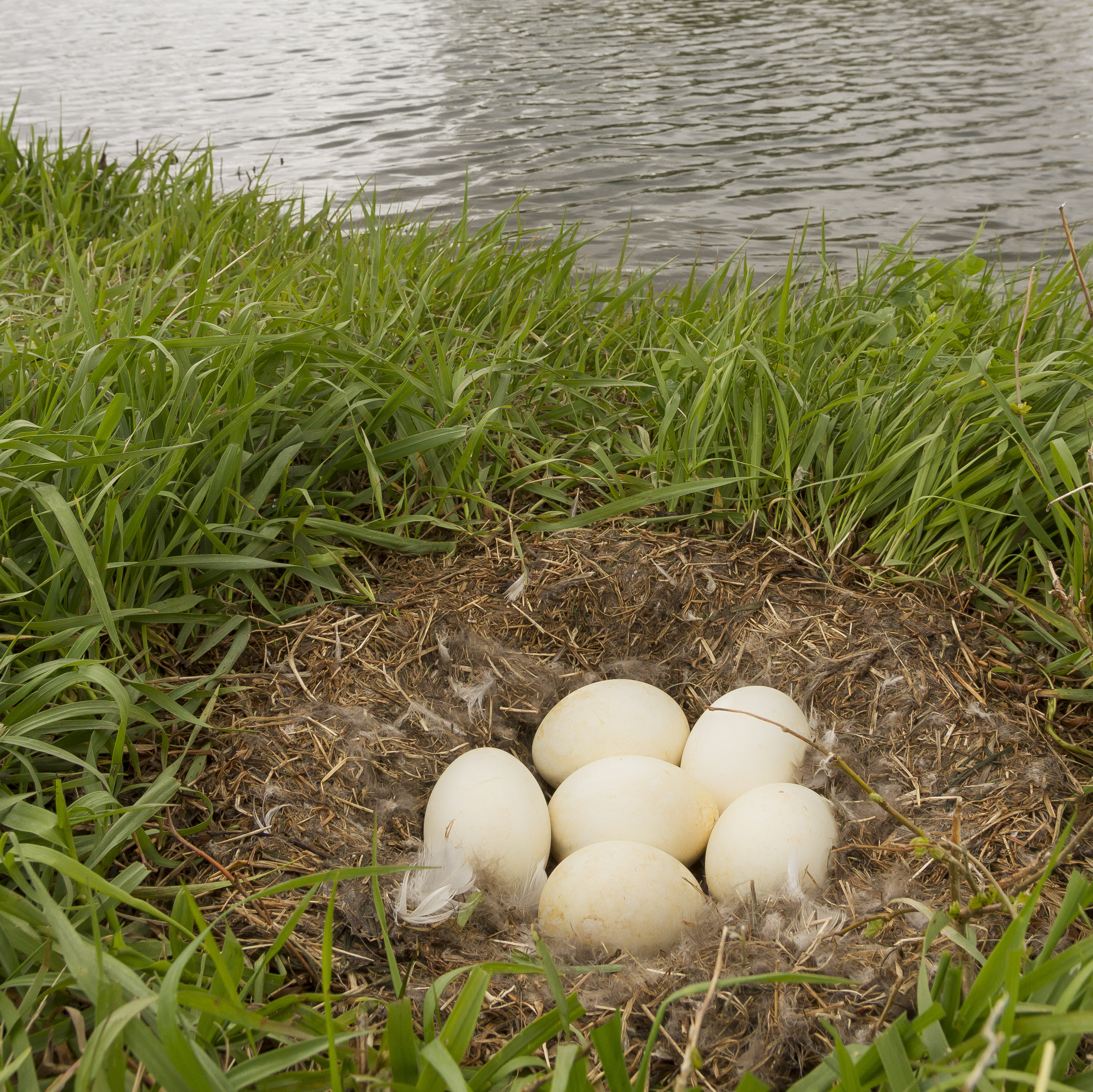
Nest with eggs

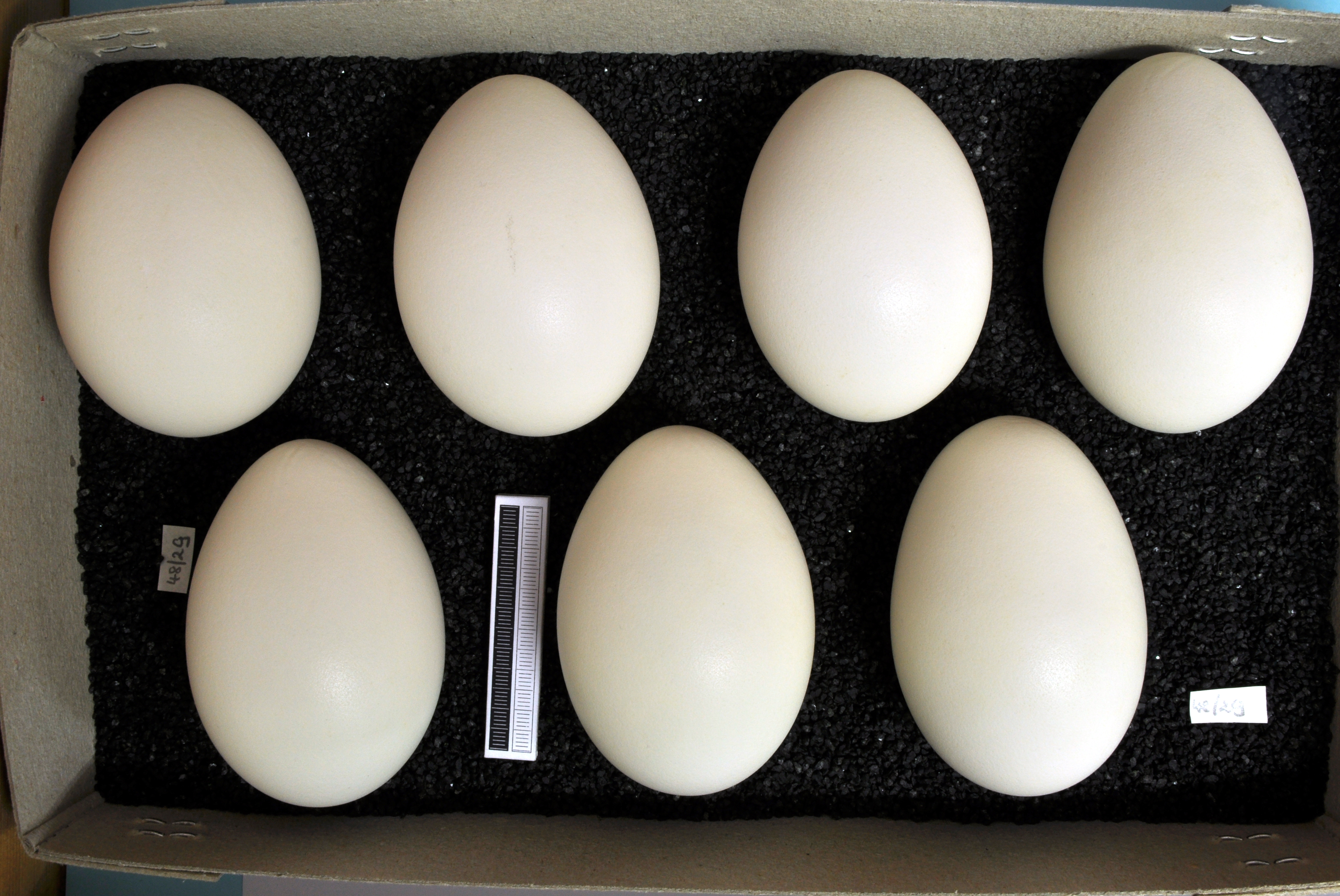
Eggs, collection Museum Wiesbaden, Germany

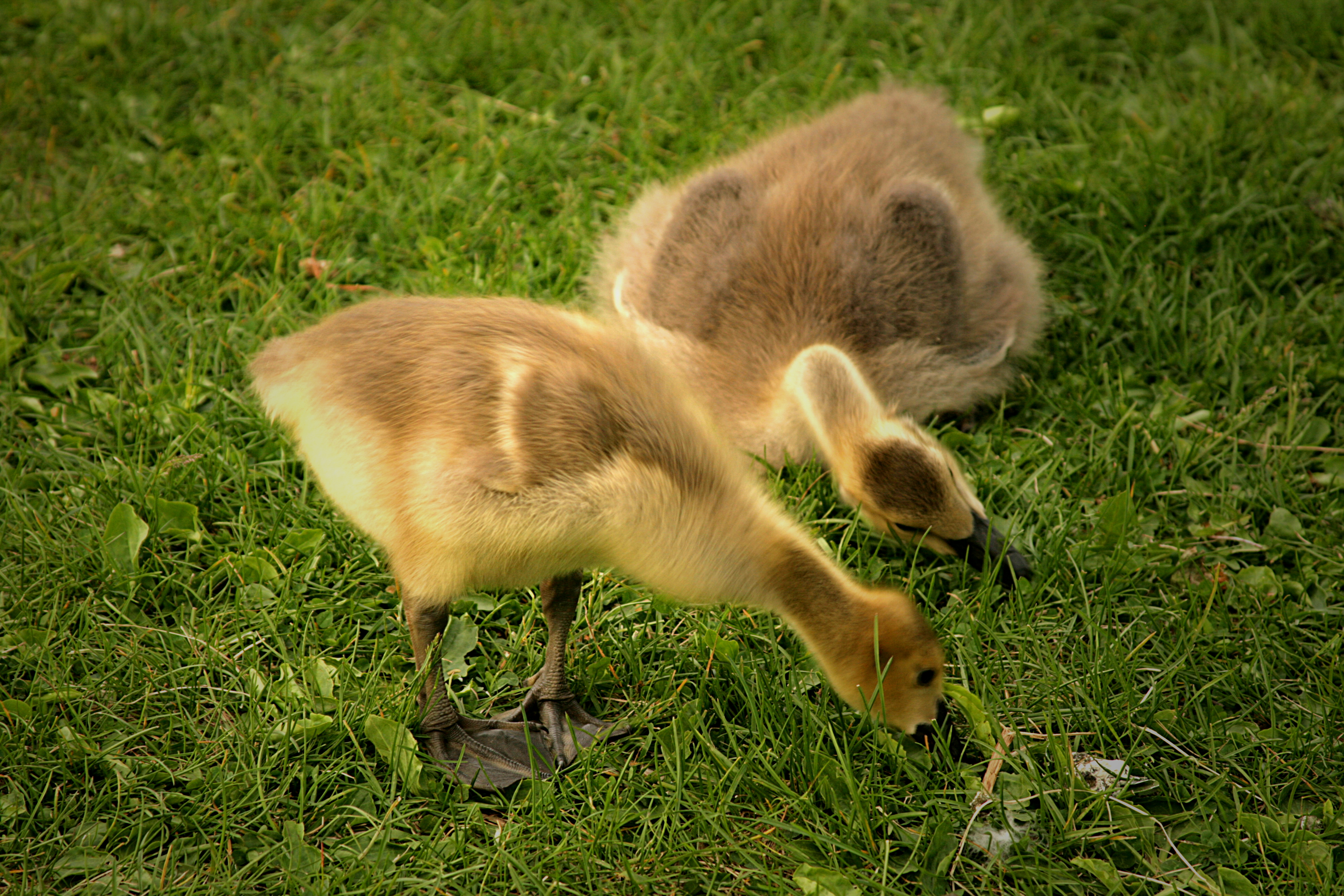
Goslings, in Alberta

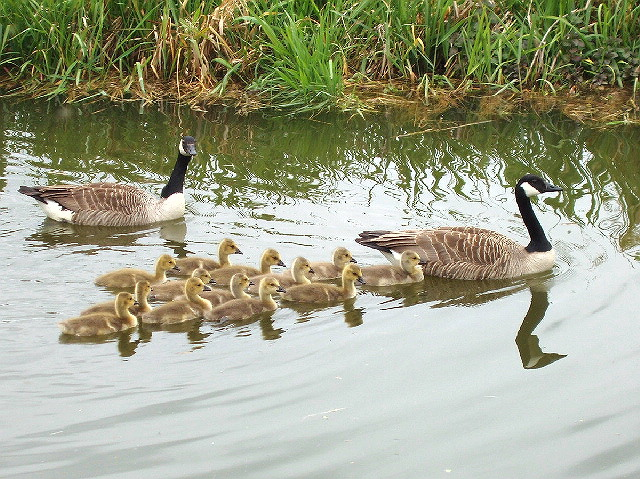
Adults with goslings, in England

=== Migration ===
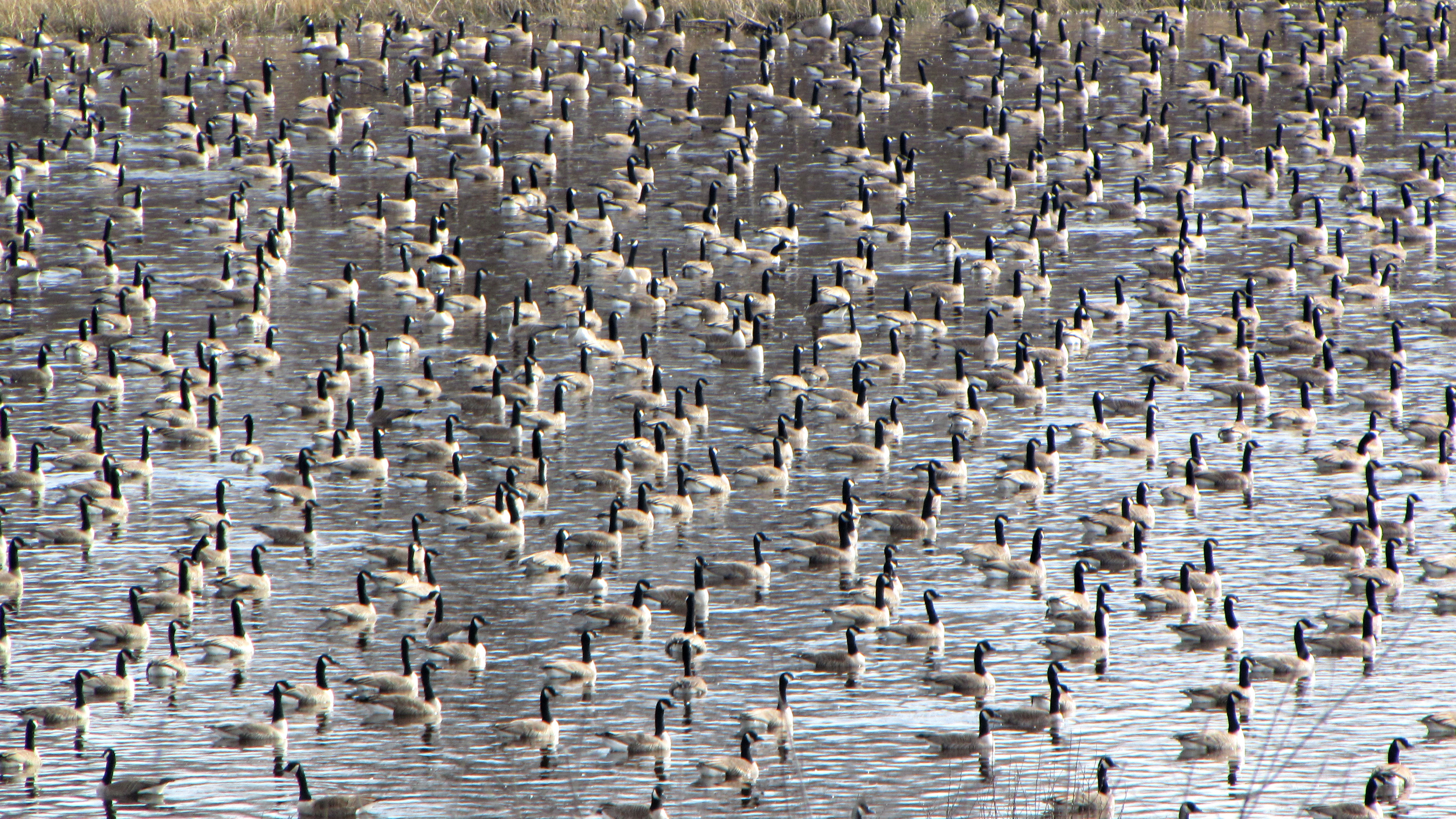
Resting in a pond during spring migration, Ottawa, Ontario

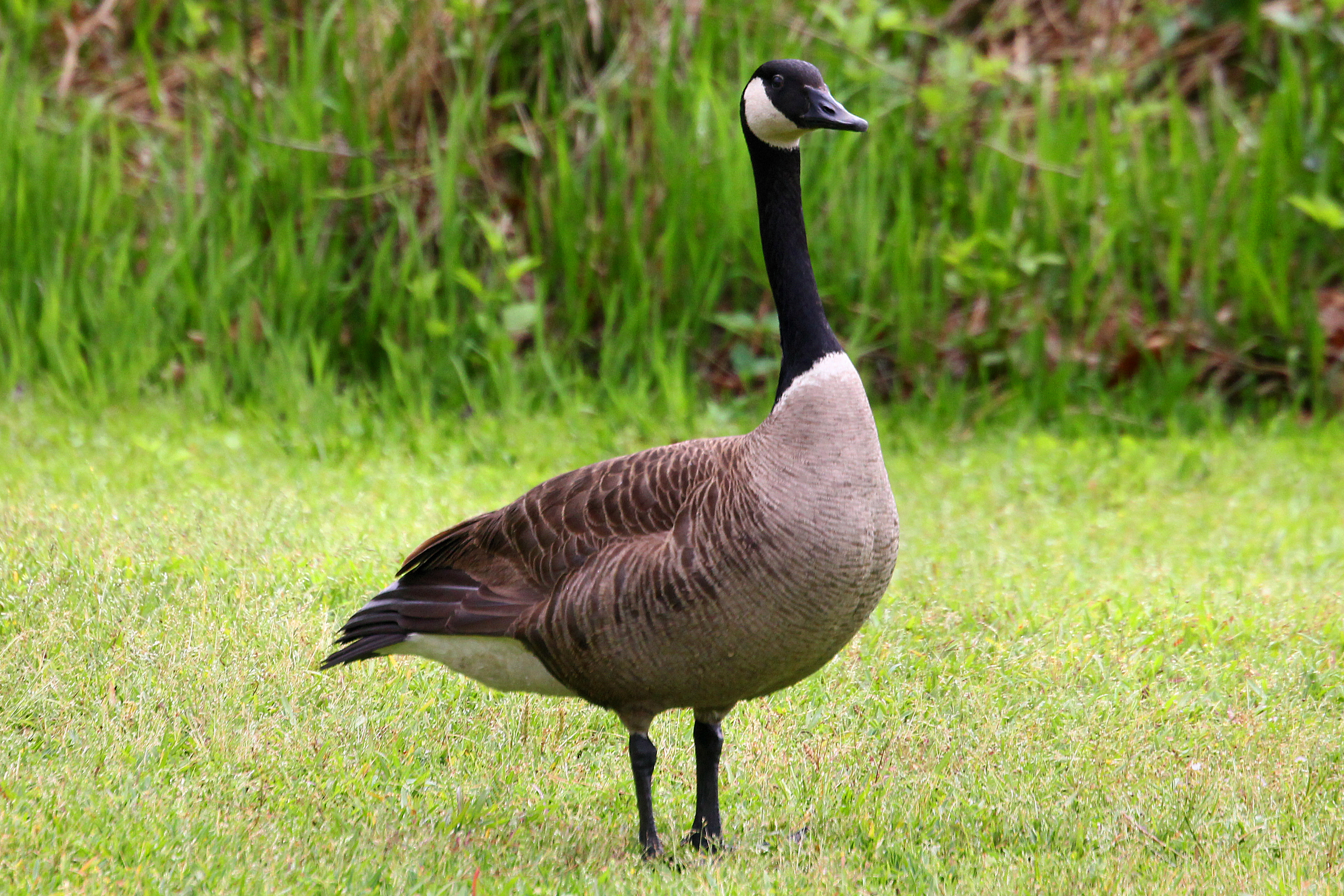
A Canada goose in Daingerfield State Park in Austin County, Texas, United States

Canada geese are known for their seasonal migrations. Most Canada geese have staging or resting areas where they join up with others. Their autumn migration can be seen from September to the beginning of November. The early migrants have a tendency to spend less time at rest stops and go through the migration much faster. The later birds usually spend more time at rest stops. Some geese return to the same nesting ground year after year and lay eggs with their mate, raising them in the same way each year. This is recorded from the many tagged geese which frequent the East Coast.

Canada geese fly in a distinctive V-shaped flight formation, with an altitude of 1 km (3,000 feet) for migration flight. The maximum flight ceiling of Canada geese is unknown, but they have been reported at 9 km (29,000 feet). Flying in the V formation has been the subject of study by researchers. The front position is rotated since flying in front consumes the most energy.

Canada geese leave the winter grounds more quickly than the summer grounds. Elevated thyroid hormones, such as T_{3} and T_{4}, have been measured in geese just after a big migration. This is believed because of the long days of flying in migration the thyroid gland sends out more T_{4} which help the body cope with the longer journey. The increased T_{4} levels are also associated with increased muscle mass (hypertrophy) of the breast muscle, also because of the longer time spent flying. It is believed that the body sends out more T_{4} to help the goose's body with this long task by speeding up the metabolism and lowering the temperature at which the muscles work. Also, other studies show levels of stress hormones such as corticosterone rise dramatically in these birds during and after a migration.

== Survival ==
The lifespan in the wild of geese who survive to adulthood ranges from 10 to 24 years. The oldest recorded individual was a 33-year-old female first tagged in Ohio in 1969. The British longevity record is held by a specimen tagged as a nestling, which was observed alive at the University of York at the age of 31. In order to survive the extreme winter temperatures, the geese prefer to stay in urban areas rather than in green spaces since industrial areas retain heat.

=== Predators ===
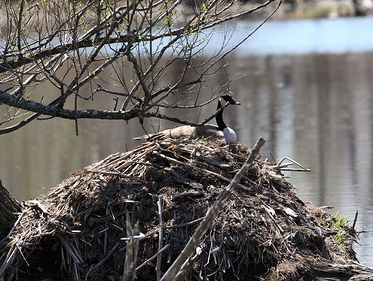
Canada geese instinctively nest on higher ground near water. This female is nesting on a beaver lodge.

Known predators of eggs and goslings include coyotes (Canis latrans), Arctic foxes (Vulpes lagopus), northern raccoons (Procyon lotor), red foxes (Vulpes vulpes), large gulls (Larus species), common ravens (Corvus corax), American crows (Corvus brachyrhynchos), carrion crows (in Europe, Corvus corone) and both brown (Ursus arctos) and American black bears (Ursus americanus). Geese and their goslings are occasionally preyed upon by domestic dogs—these occurrences can be prevented by leashing a pet dog.

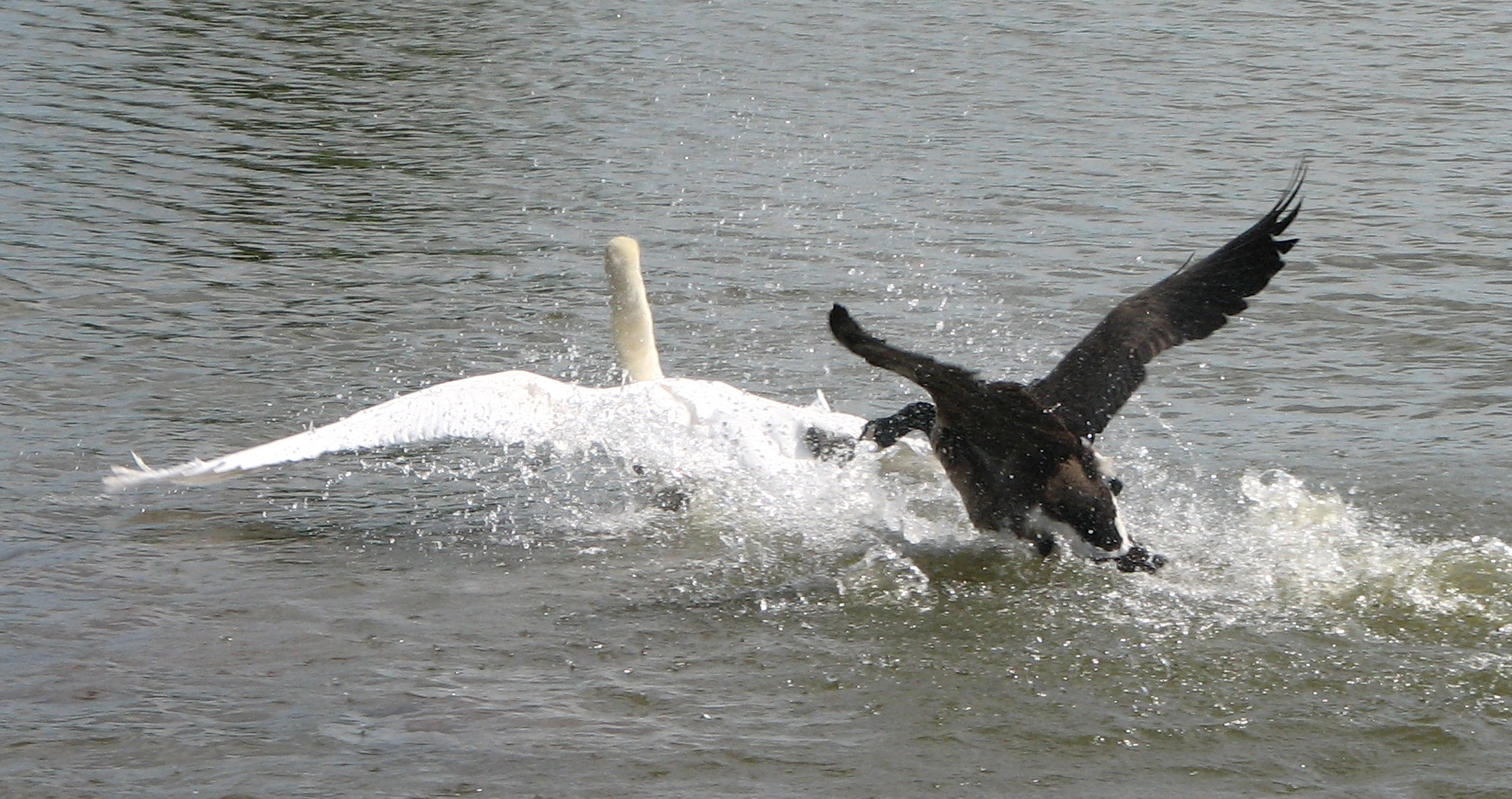
Chasing a mute swan

Once they reach adulthood, due to their large size and often aggressive behavior, Canada geese are rarely preyed on, although prior injury may make them more vulnerable to natural predators. Beyond humans, adults can be taken by coyotes and grey wolves (Canis lupus). Avian predators that are known to kill adults, as well as young geese, include snowy owls (Bubo scandiacus), golden eagles (Aquila chrysaetos) and bald eagles (Haliaeetus leucocephalus) and, though rarely on large adult geese, great horned owls (Bubo virginianus), northern goshawks (Accipiter gentilis), peregrine falcons (Falco peregrinus), and gyrfalcons (Falco rusticolus).

Adult geese are quite vigorous at displacing potential predators from the nest site, with predator prevention usually falling to the larger male of the pair. Males usually attempt to draw attention of approaching predators and toll (mob terrestrial predators without physical contact) often in accompaniment with males of other goose species. Eagles frequently cause geese to fly off en masse from some distance, though in other instances, geese may seem unconcerned at perched bald eagles nearby, seemingly only reacting if the eagle is displaying active hunting behavior.

=== Salinity ===
Salinity plays a role in the growth and development of goslings. Moderate to high salinity concentrations without fresh water results in slower development, growth, and saline-induced mortality. Goslings are susceptible to saline-induced mortality before their nasal salt glands become functional; the majority of such deaths occur before the sixth day of life.

=== Disease ===
Canada geese are susceptible to avian bird flus, such as H5N1. A study carried out using the HPAI virus, a H5N1 virus, found that the geese were susceptible to the virus. This proved useful for monitoring the spread of the virus through the high mortality of infected birds. Prior exposure to other viruses may result in some resistance to H5N1.

== Relationship with humans ==
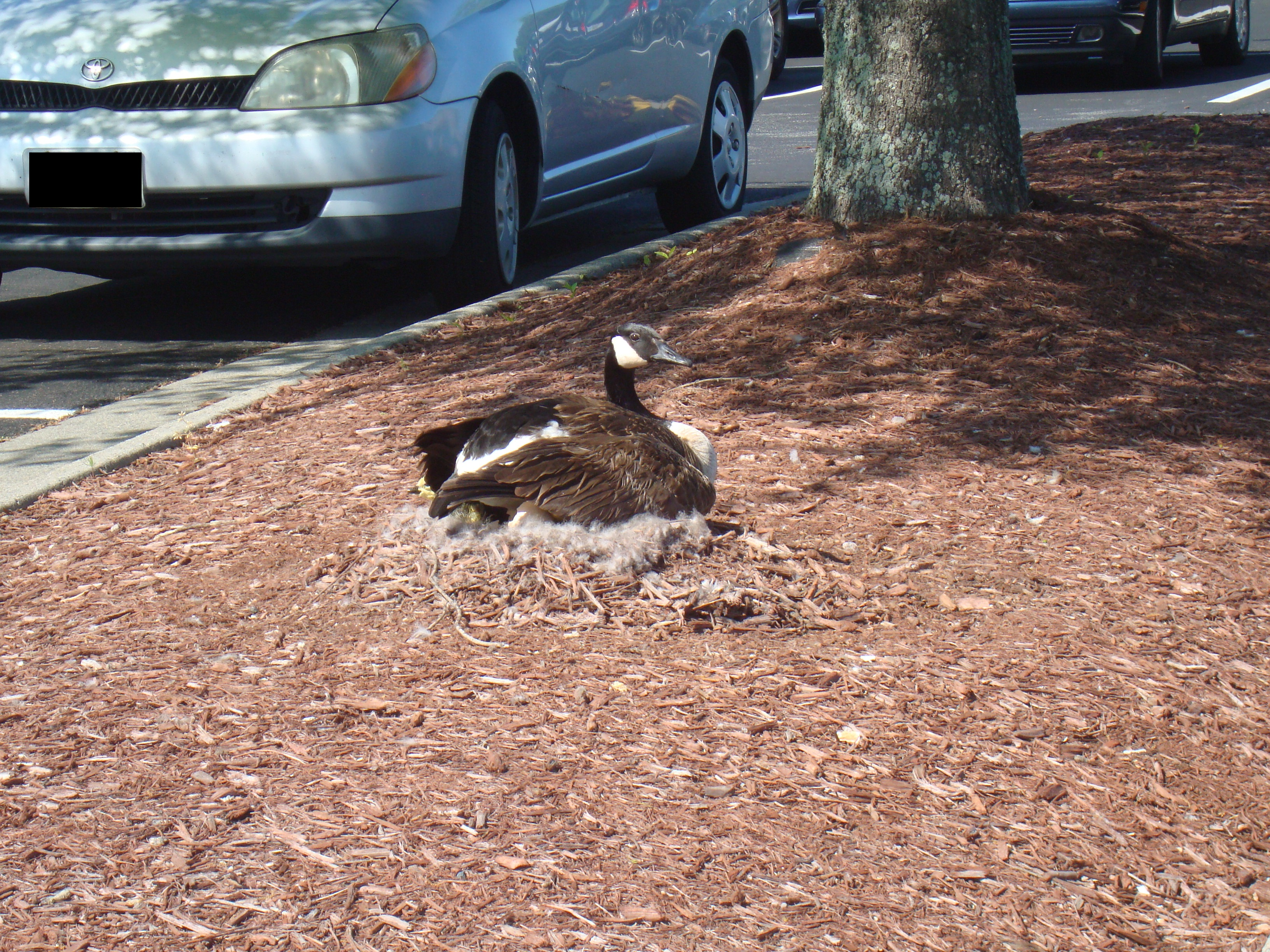
Nesting in a parking lot

The Canada goose is considered part of the Canadian national identity.

Canada geese are quite wary of humans where they are regularly hunted and killed, but can otherwise become habituated to fearlessness toward humans, especially where they are fed by them.

In North America, nonmigratory Canada goose populations have been on the rise. The species is frequently found on golf courses and urban parks, which would have previously hosted only migratory geese on rare occasions. Owing to its adaptability to human-altered areas, it has become one of the most common waterfowl species in North America. In many areas, nonmigratory Canada geese are now regarded as pests by humans. They are suspected of being a cause of an increase in high fecal coliforms at beaches.

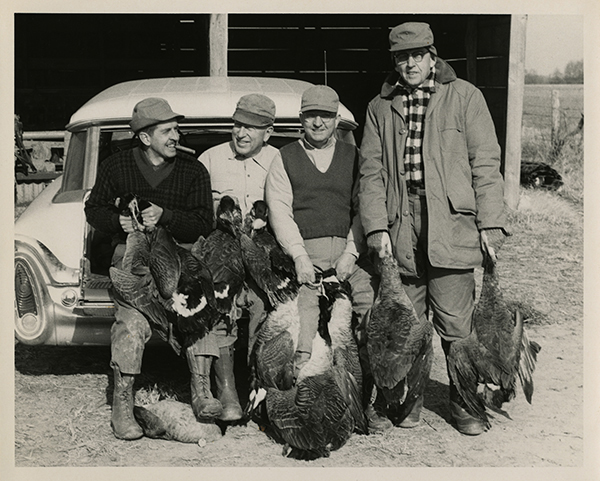
Goose hunt c. 1960

An extended hunting season, deploying noise makers, and hazing by dogs have been used in an attempt to disrupt suspect flocks. A goal of conservationists has been to focus hunting on the nonmigratory populations (which tend to be larger and more of a nuisance) as opposed to migratory flocks showing natural behavior, which may be rarer.

Since 1999, the United States Department of Agriculture Wildlife Services agency has been engaged in lethal culls of Canada geese primarily in urban or densely populated areas. The agency responds to municipalities or private land owners, such as golf courses, which find the geese obtrusive or object to their waste. Addling goose eggs and destroying nests are promoted as humane population control methods. Flocks of Canada geese can also be captured during molt and this method of culling is used to control invasive populations.

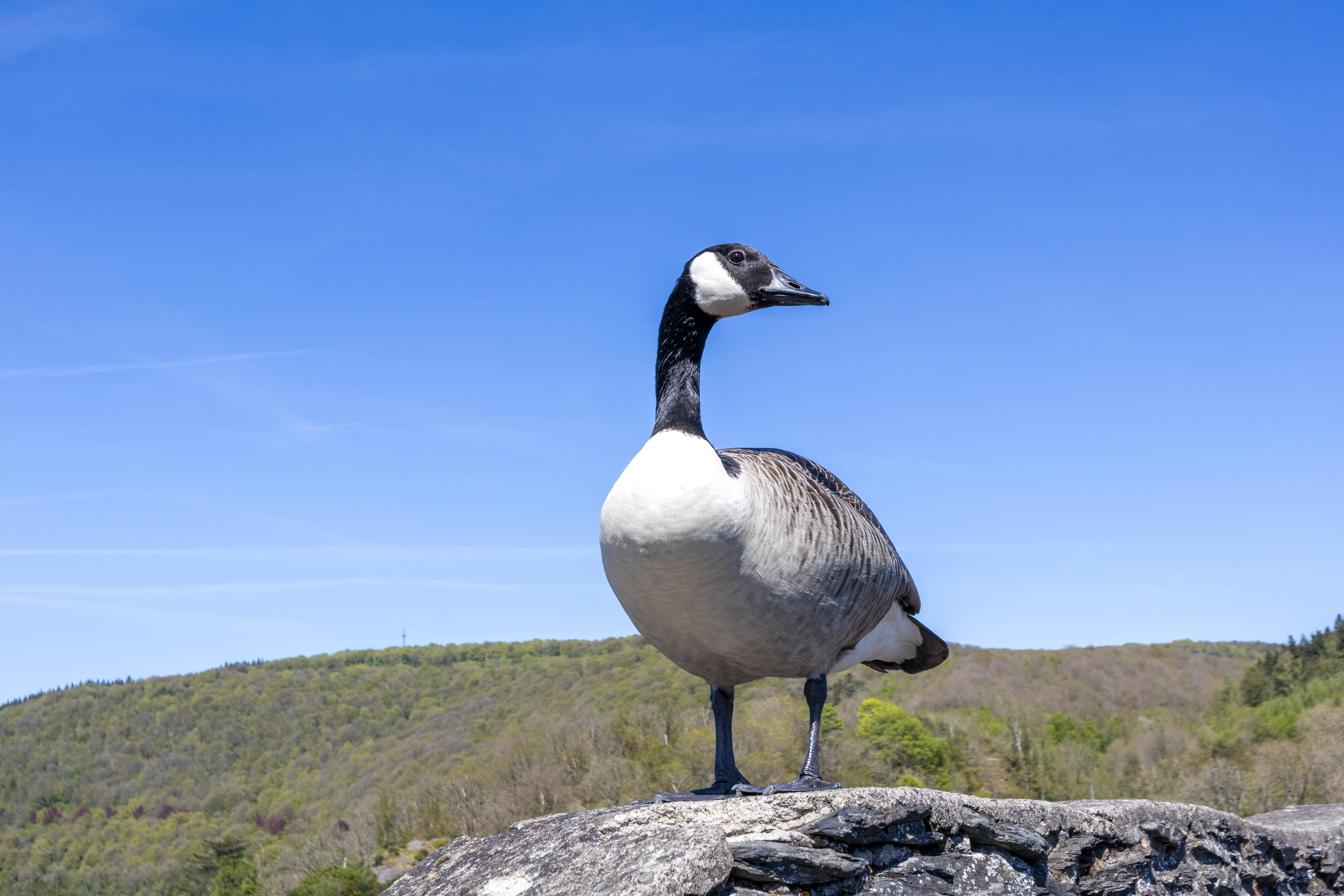
Canada goose carefully watches nearby tourists at the castle of La Roche-en-Ardenne, Belgium

Canada geese are protected from hunting and capture outside of designated hunting seasons in the United States by the Migratory Bird Treaty Act, and in Canada under the Migratory Birds Convention Act. In both countries, commercial transactions such as buying or trading are mostly prohibited and the possession, hunting, and interfering with the activity of the animals are subject to restrictions. In the UK, as with native bird species, the nests and eggs of Canada geese are fully protected by law, except when their removal has been specifically licensed, and shooting is generally permitted only during the defined open season. Geese have a tendency to attack humans when they feel themselves or their goslings to be threatened. First, the geese stand erect, spread their wings, and produce a hissing sound. Next, the geese charge. They may then peck or attack with their wings.

=== Aircraft strikes ===
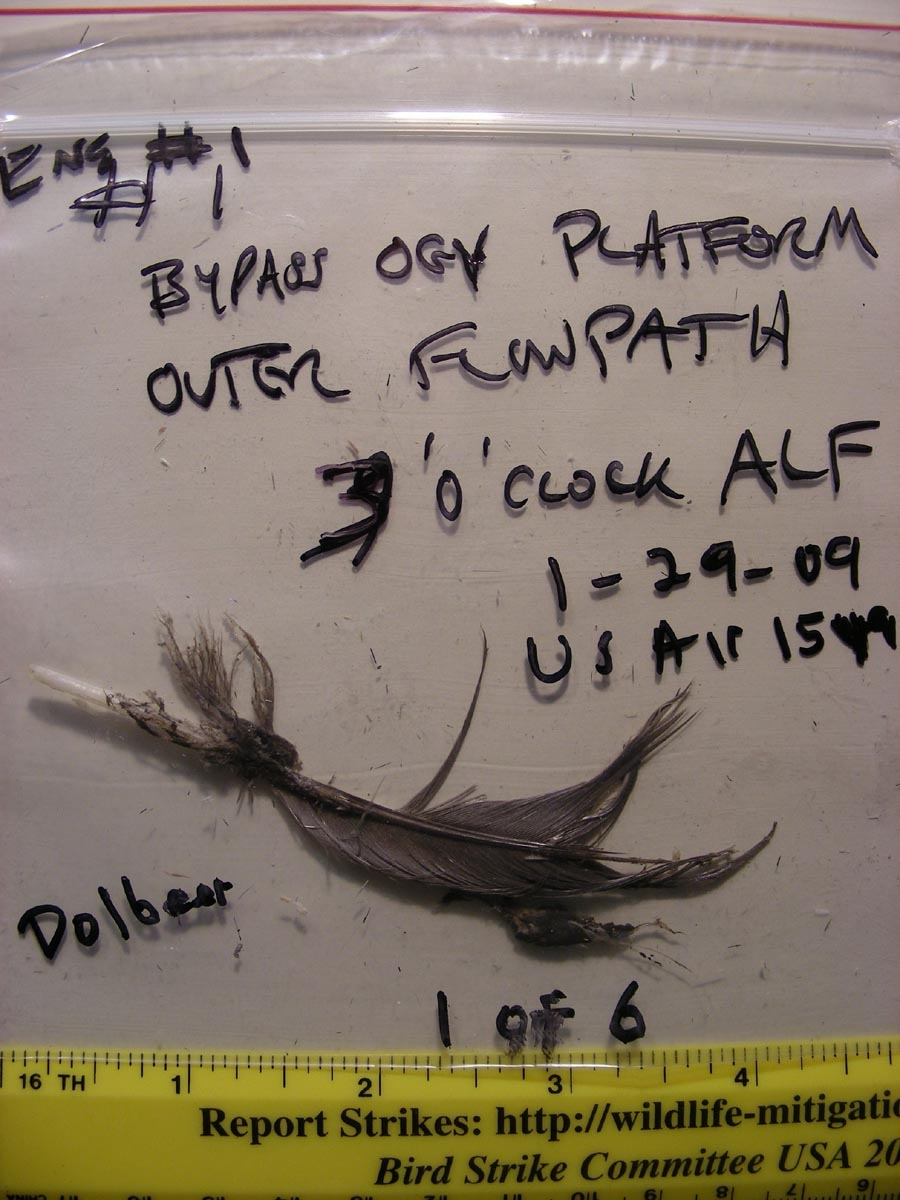
A feather from a Canada goose that was ingested into the engines of the Airbus A320 operating US Airways Flight 1549. Multiple Canada geese were ingested by the aircraft's engines, disabling the aircraft and leading to it successfully ditching in the Hudson River.

Canada geese have been implicated in a number of bird strikes by aircraft. Their large size and tendency to fly in flocks may exacerbate their impact. In the United States, the Canada goose is the second-most damaging bird strike to airplanes, with the most damaging being turkey vultures. Canada geese can cause fatal crashes when they strike an aircraft's engine. The FAA has reported 1,772 known civil aircraft strikes within the United States between 1990 and 2018. The total cost of these bird strikes to general and commercial aviation has been reported to exceed $130 million.

In 1995, a U.S. Air Force E-3 Sentry aircraft at Elmendorf AFB, Alaska, struck a flock of Canada geese on takeoff, losing power in both port side engines. It crashed 2 mi (3.2 km) from the runway, killing all 24 crew members. The accident sparked efforts to avoid such events, including habitat modification, aversion tactics, herding and relocation, and culling of flocks. In 2009, a collision with a flock of migratory Canada geese resulted in US Airways Flight 1549 suffering a total loss of power from both engines after takeoff, forcing the crew of the aircraft to ditch the plane in the Hudson River with no loss of human life.

=== Cuisine ===
As a large, common wild bird, the Canada goose is a common target of hunters, especially in its native range. Drake Larsen, a researcher in sustainable agriculture at Iowa State University, described their meat to The Atlantic magazine as "yummy ...good, lean, rich meat" and finds it "similar to a good cut of beef". The British Trust for Ornithology, however, has described them as "reputedly amongst the most inedible of birds". The U.S. goose harvest for 2013–14 reported over 1.3 million geese taken. Canada geese are rarely farmed, and sale of wild Canada goose meat is rare due to regulation and slaughterhouses' lack of experience with wild birds. Geese in New York City parks culled by the New York City Department of Environmental Protection have been donated to food banks in Pennsylvania.

== Population ==
In 2000, the North American population of the geese was estimated to be between 4 million and 5 million birds. A 20-year study from 1983 to 2003 in Wichita, Kansas, found the size of the winter Canada goose population within the city limits increased from 1,600 to over 18,000 birds.
