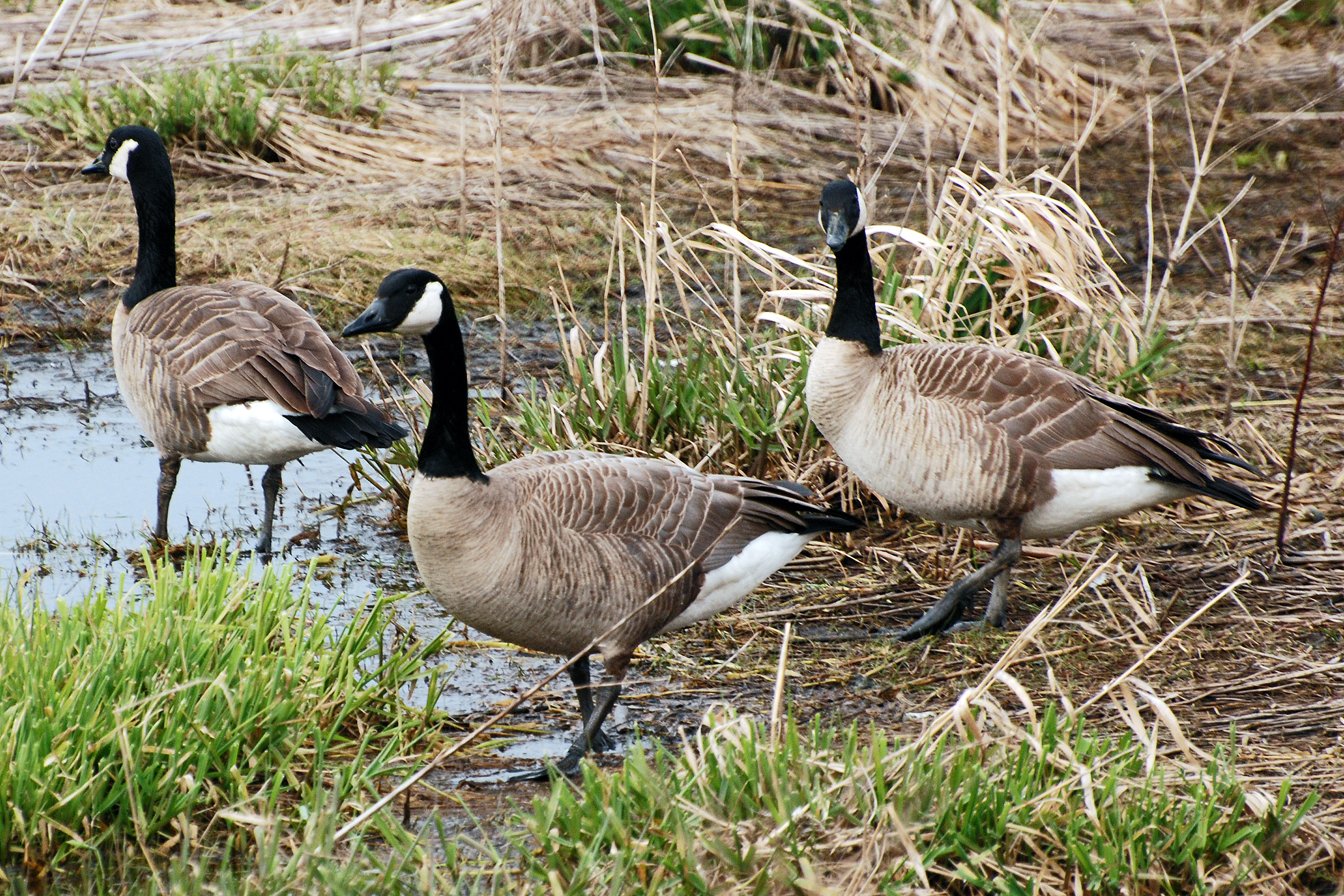

Scientific classification
- Kingdom: Animalia
- Phylum: Chordata
- Class: Aves
- Order: Anseriformes
- Family: Anatidae
- Genus: Branta
- Species: B. canadensis
- Subspecies: B. c. moffitti

Trinomial name
- Branta canadensis moffitti (Aldrich, 1946)

= Moffitt's Canada goose =

Subspecies of bird

Moffitt's Canada goose (Branta canadensis moffitti), also known as the Western Canada goose or Great Basin Canada Goose, is a subspecies of the Canada goose. Native to the western interior of North America surrounding the Rocky Mountains, its range has expanded due to introductions to various regions of western North America.

== Description ==
Moffitt's Canada goose is the second largest subspecies of Canada goose. It possesses a long neck and bill; similar to that of the slightly larger giant Canada goose (B. c. maxima). It can also have small, white patches found over its eyes or forehead, a trait more commonly found on maxima. Their coloration is paler than that of most other subspecies but slightly darker than maxima, sporting a pale gray-brown body and whiteish breast. Many individuals also have a white collar at the base of the neck. They also have large, broad wings.

== Taxonomy ==
Though moffitti and maxima have sometimes been lumped as one subspecies, most authorities today recognize the two as distinct. The two subspecies interbreed where their ranges overlap, and introduced stocks of Canada Geese often consist of intergrades between the two subspecies.

== Distribution ==
Moffitt's geese are known to inhabit areas as far south as California, as northward as British Columbia, and as east as Montana. The subspecies is represented in three distinct populations of Canada goose: the Pacific Population (PP), Rocky Mountain Population (RMP) and Hi-Line Population (HLP). The Rocky Mountain population breeds in central Alberta, western Montana, and the Intermountain West down to Arizona and New Mexico, and migrates to southern part of its range as well as Southern California. The Pacific Population consists of intergrades with other subspecies, including the Giant Canada Goose and Interior Canada Goose (B. c. interior), and is found from Northern British Columbia and Alberta south through the Pacific Northwest towards central California and western Nevada. Though birds that breed in the northern part of this range will migrate south, a large portion of the Pacific Population consists of introduced stocks 1960s and 1970s which have consequently become non-migratory residents. They have been introduced to the Lower Mainland and Vancouver Island, and have become year-round residents in areas where other subspecies of Canada Geese (such as the Vancouver Canada Goose B. c. fulva) were once only infrequent breeders or transient migrants. The Hi-Line Population consists of both moffitti and maxima, and is found in Alberta, Saskatchewan, Wyoming and Colorado and are short-distance migrants that winter in the southern part of their range towards central New Mexico.

Outside North America, this subspecies occurs as an invasive species in Japan, having become established in the country around the mid-1980s.

== Behavior and breeding ==
Moffitt's Canada goose is often unwary and tame in the presence of people and urban settings. This includes golf courses and other large grass fields. This bird is adapted to ecological changes.

Moffitt's geese are among the first waterfowl to nest in spring, as early as late February or early March. They typically nest in abandoned hawk and heron nests, though they may also nest at the top of tall tree stumps, as well as on the rooftop of tall buildings.

== Human interaction ==
Due to their sedentary nature, Moffitt's Canada Geese are considered a nuisance due to their noise and droppings. In its introduced range they are sometimes considered invasive species, possibly displacing other local or migratory subspecies of Canada Geese. Hunting of the Moffitt's Canada goose is encouraged by many park managers and rye farmers. Their population has expanded in part due to the urbanization of metropolitan areas where hunting is discouraged. In cities, wildlife officers have attempted to reduce their population by addling their eggs.
