= Dusky Canada goose =

Conservation status
- Vulnerable (NatureServe)

Scientific classification
- Kingdom: Animalia
- Phylum: Chordata
- Class: Aves
- Order: Anseriformes
- Family: Anatidae
- Genus: Branta
- Species: B. canadensis
- Subspecies: B. c. occidentalis

Trinomial name
- Branta canadensis occidentalis (Baird, 1858)

Subspecies of bird

The dusky Canada goose (Branta canadensis occidentalis) is a subspecies of the Canada goose. They are the darkest variant, similar to the Pacific cackling goose. Tagged dusky geese have red bands with white letters on them attached to their neck. They represent one of the smallest populations of Canada goose in the Pacific Northwest. Due to the species' minimal population and exclusive breeding grounds, the dusky Canada goose is a species of interest to the Pacific Flyway Council and the U.S. Forest Service. The Cordova Ranger District, on the Chugach National Forest, has been working since 1984 to implement a monitoring and restoration program for the geese.

== Description ==
The dusky Canada goose is the darkest of the subspecies of the Canada goose. They have a warm brown breast and body, contrasting the buff breast and gray body of other subspecies. Dusky Canada geese represent one of the smallest populations of Canada goose in North America. The dusky Canada goose weighs approximately 3–12 lb (1.4–5.4 kg) and is 25–45 in (640–1,140 mm) in length. Male and female geese have black heads and necks, white cheeks, and similar voices. Approximately four to six eggs are the size of each clutch, with an average incubation period of four weeks.

== Taxonomy ==
The dusky Canada goose is occasionally merged with the Vancouver Canada goose (B. c. fulva), but the latter is larger and largely nonmigratory and found from southern Alaska to northern Vancouver Island, British Columbia. Dusky geese, along with the giant Canada goose, are the most closely related birds to the Hawaiian goose, or nene. Based on the genetic analysis, they settled in Hawaii around 500,000 years ago. However, over sixty years of banding data. suggest that the majority of the dusky population breed on the Copper River Delta, Alaska and winter in the Willamette Valley. Other than a few geese nesting on Middleton Island in the Gulf of Alaska, the Copper River Delta is known as the exclusive breeding grounds for this subspecies. Population estimates indicated that there were approximately 20,000 to 25,000 geese in the 1970s and between 12,000 and 15,000 in the 1990s. This decline prompted the strict conservation efforts by the U.S. Forest Service in 1984.

== Behavior ==
Dusky Canada geese are often more wary than some of the other subspecies, flying low and inspecting a potential area to land before descending. Their wings molt from around early July to early August. Often, molting individuals will wait in sub-alpine lakes for their feathers to grow back. The dusky Canada goose mainly winters in much of the Willamette Valley and southern Washington and breeds in the southeast Alaskan Copper River Delta and Middleton Island. However, the dusky Canada geese have faced heavy predation through predators such as brown bears (Ursus arctos), coyotes (Canis latrans), and bald eagles (Haliaeetus leucocephalus), with bald eagles acting as the most destructive predator. Studies suggest that bald eagles account for nearly eighty percent of nest predation.

== Breeding ==
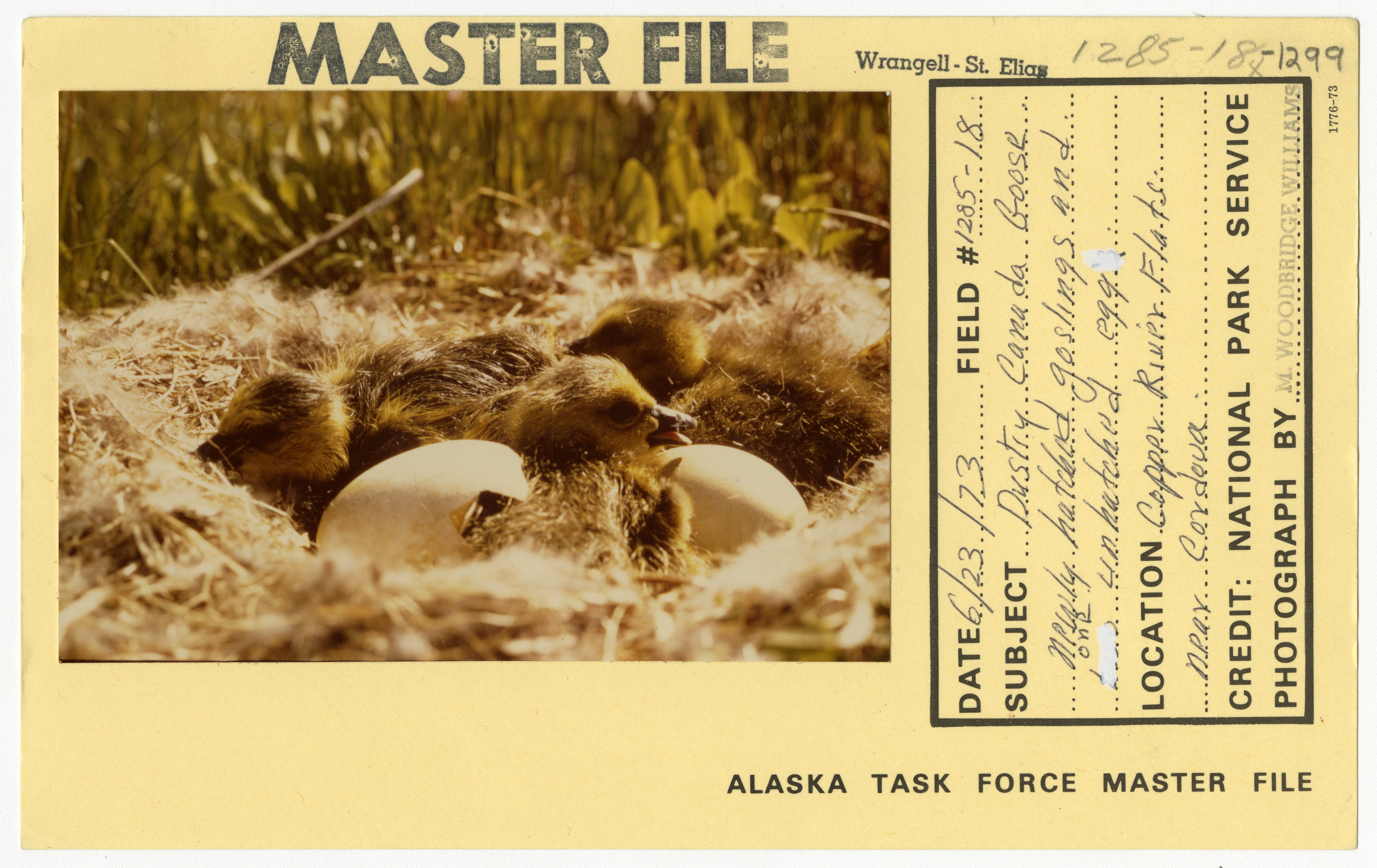
Newly hatched Dusky Canada goslings

Breeding populations occur on Middleton Island and the Copper River Delta. An earthquake in 1964 lifted the delta by around 4 feet (1.2 meters), damaging usable breeding grounds. Middleton Island contains around 1,500 breeding birds, which is close to the maximum birds the island can handle. New breeding islands have been created to increase the population. However, because the population is in such a limited area, small environmental changes can drastically alter the future outlook of the subspecies. Alaskan predators such as bears and foxes have come in contact with the native breeding population in recent years. Dusky populations have dropped due to this new threat. Since the Great Alaska Earthquake of 1964, measuring in at 9.2 magnitude, caused existing wetlands to dry, predation rates increased in the following years. This phenomenon ultimately led to the 1984 implementation of the dusky conservation program, a joint project led by the U.S. Forest Service that includes the Alaska Department of Fish and Wildlife, Oregon Department of Fish and Wildlife, and Ducks Unlimited Incorporated. The goal of the program has been to promote the reproductive rates of the species to boost their population size. In order to do this, the program has installed artificial nest islands in various ponds across the Copper River Delta to mimic the appearance of natural nest islands and act as useful locations for the geese to nest. Over time, these artificial nest islands have shown to have dusky nest occupancy rate increases from 10% to 50% from 1984 to 2011, and an average annual nest success rate of 63%.
