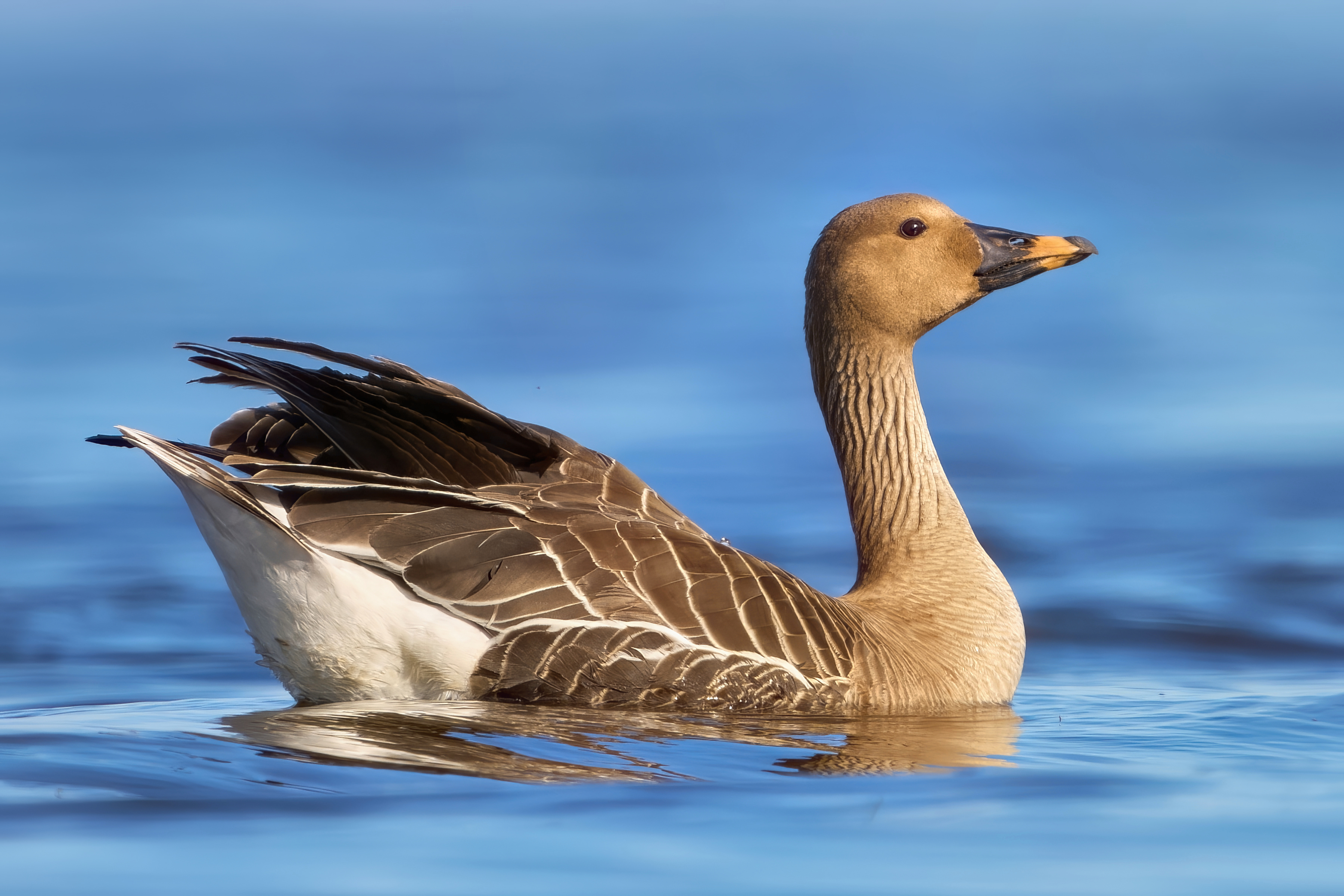
- A. f. fabalis near St Petersburg, Russia

Conservation status
- Least Concern (IUCN 3.1)

Scientific classification
- Kingdom: Animalia
- Phylum: Chordata
- Class: Aves
- Order: Anseriformes
- Family: Anatidae
- Genus: Anser
- Species: A. fabalis

Binomial name
- Anser fabalis (Latham, 1787)
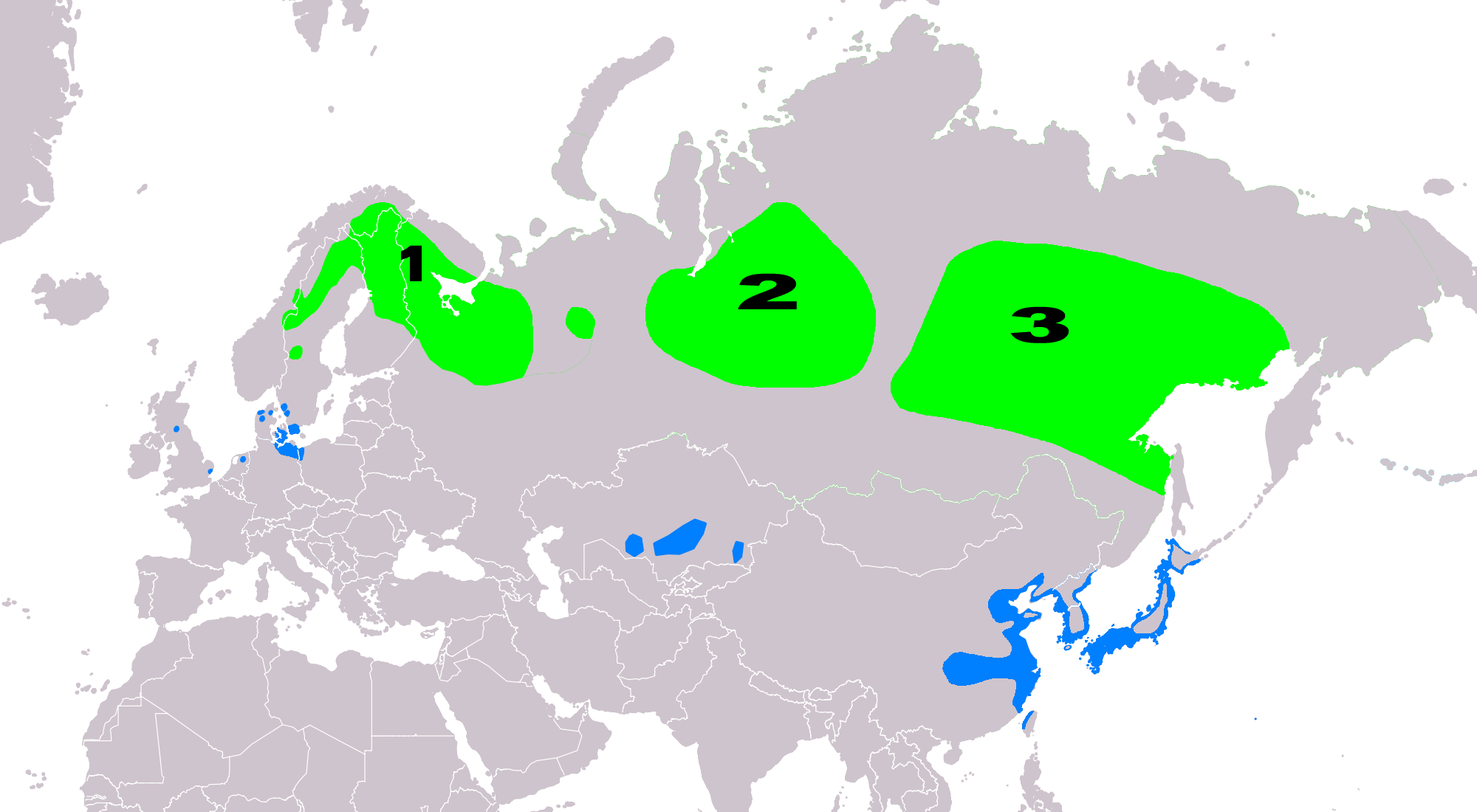
- Range of A. fabalis Breeding Passage Non-breeding: 1. A. f. fabalis 2. A. f. johanseni 3. A. f. middendorffii

= Taiga bean goose =

Species of bird

The taiga bean goose (Anser fabalis) is a species of goose that breeds in northern Europe and Asia. It is migratory and winters further south in Europe and Asia. This and the tundra bean goose were recognised as separate species by the International Ornithologists' Union and the American Ornithological Society from 2007, but are still considered a single species by some other authorities (collectively called bean goose), notably BirdLife International and the IUCN. The taiga and tundra bean goose diverged about 2.5 million years ago and established secondary contact c. 60,000 years ago, resulting in extensive gene flow.

== Description ==
The length ranges from 68 to 90 cm (27–35 in), wingspan from 140 to 174 cm (55–69 in) and weight from 1.7–4 kg (3.7–8.8 lb). In the nominate subspecies, males average 3.2 kg (7.1 lb) and females average 2.84 kg (6.3 lb). The bill is black at the base and tip, with an orange band across the middle; the legs and feet are also bright orange.

The upper wing-coverts are dark brown, as in the white-fronted goose (Anser albifrons) and the lesser white-fronted goose (A. erythropus), but differing from these in having narrow white fringes to the feathers. The voice is a loud honking.

The closely related pink-footed goose (A. brachyrhynchus) has the bill short, bright pink in the middle, and the feet also pink, the upper wing-coverts being paler and greyer, nearly of the same bluish-grey as in the greylag goose. In size and bill structure, it is very similar to the tundra bean goose subspecies Anser serrirostris rossicus, and in the past was sometimes treated as a sixth subspecies of bean goose.

== Taxonomy ==
The English and scientific names of the bean goose come from its habit in the past of grazing in bean field stubbles in winter. Anser is the Latin for "goose", and fabalis is derived from the Latin faba, the broad bean.

=== Subspecies ===
There are three subspecies, with complex variation in body size and bill size and pattern; generally, size increases from north to south and from west to east.

Subspecies	Authority	Description	Range	Image
A. f. fabalis	Latham, 1787	Large; bill long and narrow, with broad orange band.	Scandinavia east to the Urals, wintering mainly from Denmark east to Poland, locally west to Scotland and south to France, northern Italy, and Hungary.	
A. f. johanseni	Delacour, 1951	Large; bill long and narrow, with narrow orange band.	West Siberian taiga, wintering mainly in south-central Asia, rarely west to eastern Europe, and exceptionally south to northern India.	
A. f. middendorffii	Severtzov, 1873	Very large; bill long and stout, with narrow orange band.	East Siberian taiga, wintering in eastern China, Korea, and Japan.	

== Conservation ==
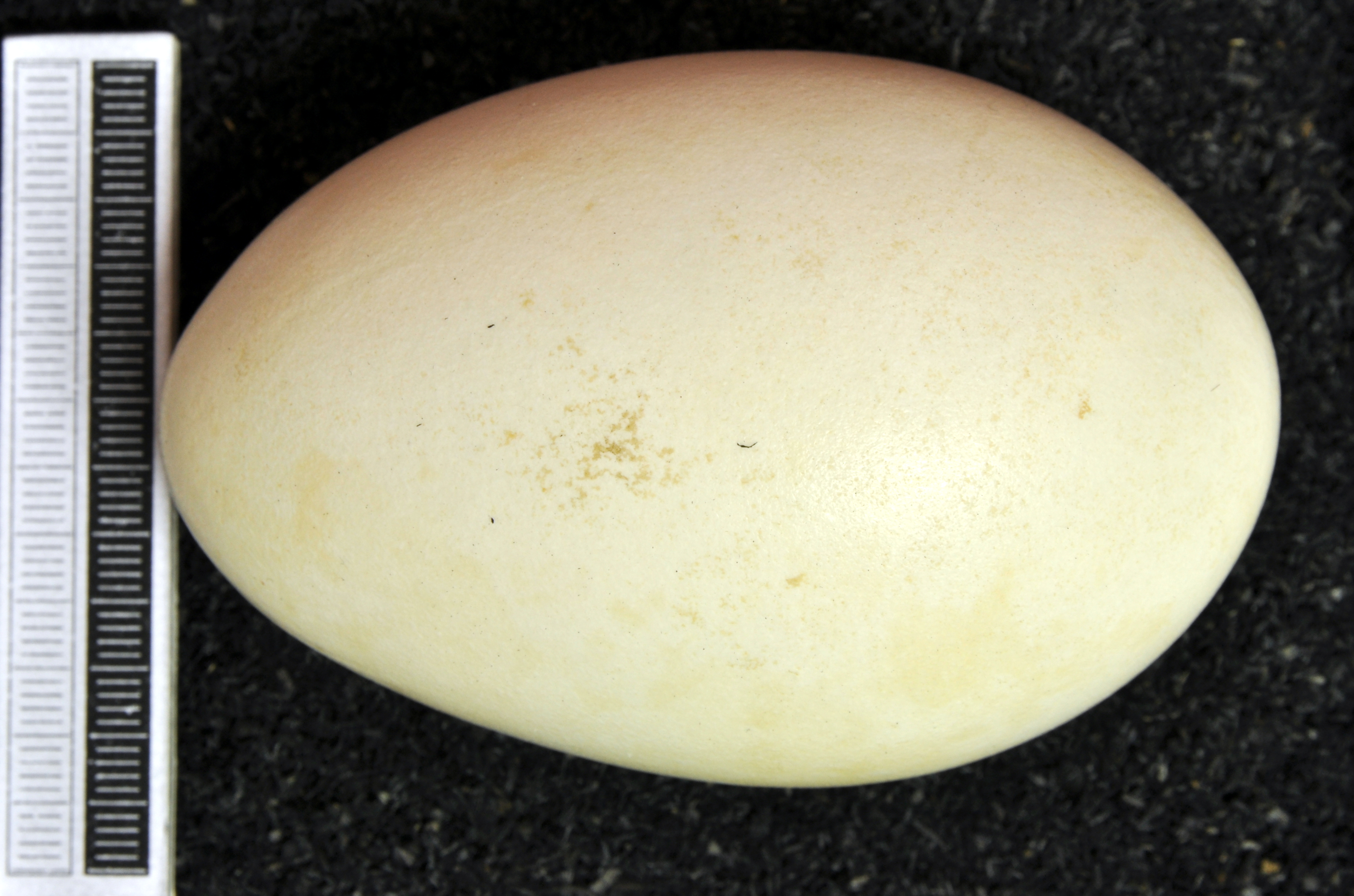
Egg at Museum Wiesbaden, Germany

The western subspecies A. f. fabalis wintering in Europe are considered to migrate across three different flyways: Western, Central and Eastern; these have been confirmed by stable isotope analysis of their flight feathers. Anser fabalis fabalis is one of the species to which the Agreement on the Conservation of African-Eurasian Migratory Waterbirds (AEWA) applies.

It is a rare winter visitor to Great Britain; there are two regular wintering flocks of taiga bean goose, in the Yare Valley, Norfolk and the Avon Valley between Glasgow and Edinburgh, Scotland. A formerly regular flock in Dumfries and Galloway no longer occurs there.
