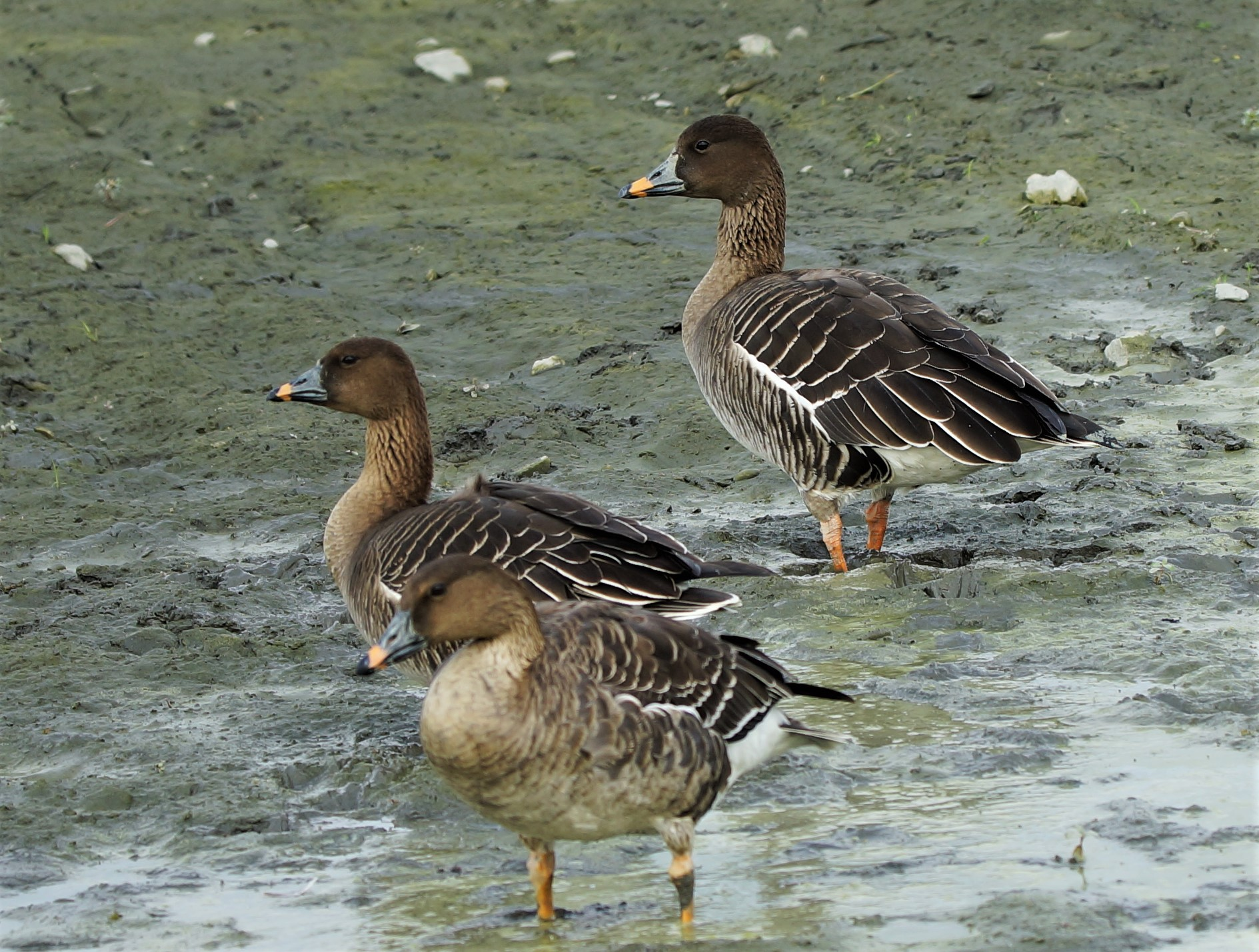
- Wintering tundra bean geese in Tainan, Taiwan

Scientific classification
- Kingdom: Animalia
- Phylum: Chordata
- Class: Aves
- Order: Anseriformes
- Family: Anatidae
- Genus: Anser
- Species: A. serrirostris

Binomial name
- Anser serrirostris Gould, 1852

= Tundra bean goose =

Species of bird

The tundra bean goose (Anser serrirostris) is a goose that breeds in northern Siberia. This and the taiga bean goose are recognised as separate species by the American Ornithological Society and International Ornithologists' Union, but are considered a single species by other authorities (collectively called bean goose). It is migratory and winters further south in Asia. The taiga and tundra bean goose diverged about 2.5 million years ago and established secondary contact ca. 60,000 years ago, resulting in extensive gene flow.

== Description ==
The length ranges from 68 to 90 cm (27–35 in), wingspan from 140 to 174 cm (55–69 in) and weight from 1.7–4 kg (3.7–8.8 lb). In the nominate subspecies, males average 3.2 kg (7.1 lb) and females average 2.84 kg (6.3 lb). The bill is black at the base and tip, with an orange band across the middle; the legs and feet are also bright orange.

The upper wing-coverts are dark brown, as in the white-fronted goose (Anser albifrons) and the lesser white-fronted goose (A. erythropus), but differing from these in having narrow white fringes to the feathers.

The voice is a loud honking, higher pitched in the smaller subspecies.

The closely related pink-footed goose (A. brachyrhynchus) has the bill short, bright pink in the middle, and the feet also pink, the upper wing-coverts being nearly of the same bluish-grey as in the greylag goose.

== Taxonomy ==
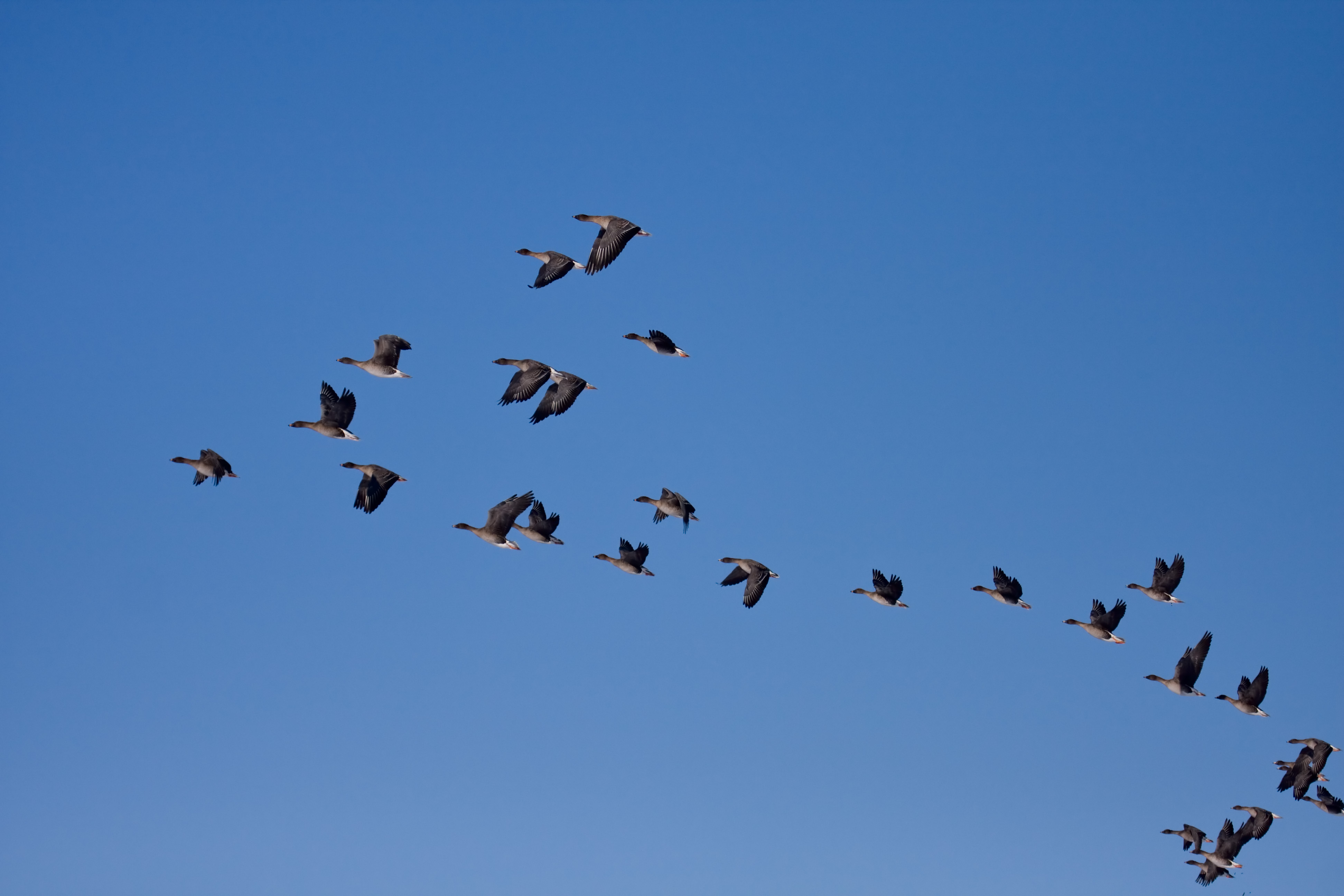
A flock of tundra bean geese

There are two subspecies:

- A. s. rossicus Buturlin, 1933. Northern Russian tundra east to the Taimyr Peninsula. Small; bill short and stubby, with narrow orange band. Anser fabalis rossicus is one of the species to which the Agreement on the Conservation of African-Eurasian Migratory Waterbirds (AEWA) applies.
- A. s. serrirostris Gould, 1852. East Siberian tundra. Large; bill long and stout, with narrow orange band.

== Distribution ==
The tundra bean goose has no regular wintering sites, but is found in small groups among other grey goose species – among the most regular localities are WWT Slimbridge, Gloucestershire and Holkham Marshes, Norfolk.
