= Carpometacarpus =

Fusion of the carpal and metacarpal bone

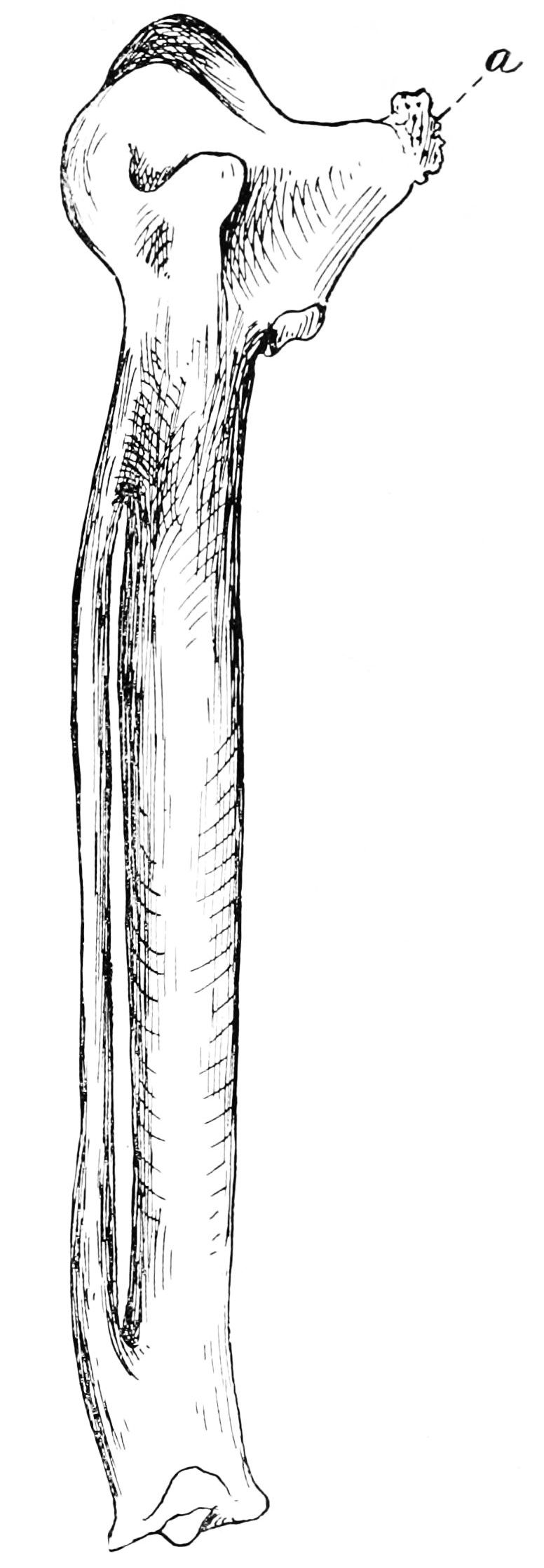
Left carpometacarpus from the hand of an extinct swan (Olor paloregonus = Cygnus paloregonus) from Oregon. Date: 1892–1893, Source: Popular Science Monthly Volume 42

The carpometacarpus is a bone found in the hands of birds. It results from the fusion of the carpal and metacarpal bone, and is essentially a single fused bone between the wrist and the knuckles. It is a smallish bone in most birds, generally flattened and with a large hole in the middle. In flightless birds, however, its shape may be slightly different, or it might be absent entirely.

It forms the tip of the wing skeleton in birds. To it, most of the primary remiges attach. The alula, by contrast, is formed by the thumb, which does not completely fuse with the other hand-bones. Likewise, the tipmost primaries attach to the phalanx bones.

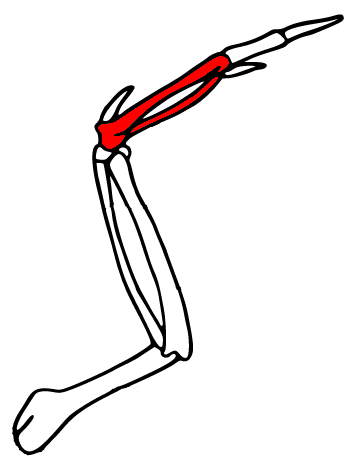
Carpometacarpus is in red in this description of the bird wing bones

To non-biologists the carpometacarpus may be best known from buffalo wings. Buffalo wings come in two basic sizes, a large angled one containing three major bones, and a smaller flat one containing only two. The bone missing in the latter is the carpometacarpus.

== See also ==
- Carpometacarpal joint, a joint (not a bone) in the human wrist
- Tarsometatarsus, a similarly fused bone in bird legs
