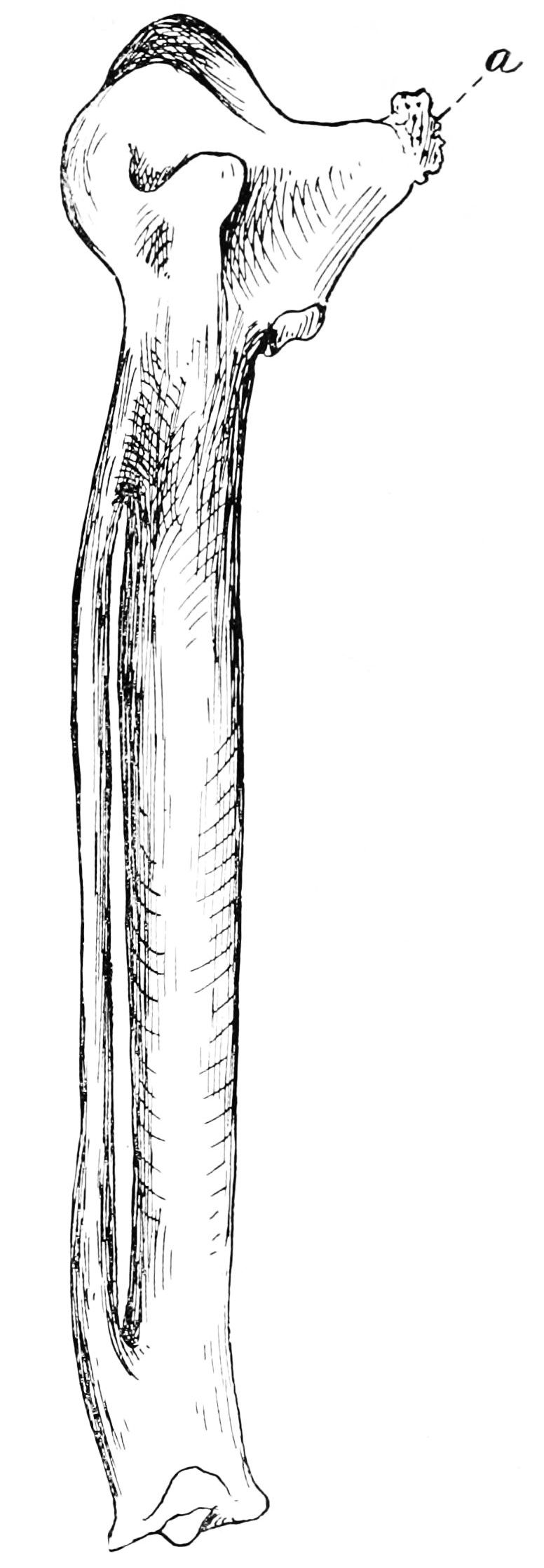
- Left carpometacarpus from the hand of an extinct swan (Olor paloregonus = Cygnus paloregonus) from Oregon. note on a a: pathological condition that consists in a more or less abundant exudation of spongy, osseous material that appeared upon the proximal part of the first or pollex metacarpal of the carpo-metacarpus

Scientific classification
- Kingdom: Animalia
- Phylum: Chordata
- Class: Aves
- Order: Anseriformes
- Family: Anatidae
- Genus: Cygnus
- Species: C. paloregonus

Binomial name
- Cygnus paloregonus Cope, 1878

Synonyms
- Anser condoni Schufeldt 1892; Cygnus matthewi Schufeldt 1913; Olor matthewi Schufeldt 1913; Olor paloregonus (Cope); Sthenelides paloregonus

= Cygnus paloregonus =

Cygnus paloregonus Temporal range: Middle Pleistocene

Extinct species of bird

Cygnus paloregonus is a fossil swan. It is an ancestor of, and distantly allied to, the mute swan. It is known from the Pleistocene from Fossil Lake, Oregon, Froman's Ferry, Idaho, and from Arizona. It is referred to by Hildegarde Howard in Delacour's The Waterfowl of the World as "probably the mute type swan".

== See also ==
- List of fossil bird genera
- Silver Lake (Oregon)
