= Anser thraciensis =

Anser thraciensis Temporal range: Miocene–Pliocene

Scientific classification
- Kingdom: Animalia
- Phylum: Chordata
- Class: Aves
- Order: Anseriformes
- Family: Anatidae
- Genus: Anser
- Species: A. thraciensis

Binomial name
- Anser thraciensis Burchak-Abramovich & Nikolov, 1984

Extinct genus of birds

Anser thraciensis is an extinct species of water bird belonging to the living genus Anser. It was first named by Burchak-Abramovich and Nikolov (1984) from Trojanovo, Bulgaria. They also named Phalacrocorax serdicensis in the publication, from the same locality. The National Museum of Natural History, Sofia notes that 17 specimens of this taxon are presently held in their collections, catalogued as NMNHS 1407-1420, 1622-1625, and 1650-1652.

== Description ==
It was described in 1984 from 11 fragments from an adult individual, including a proximal and distal humerus, coracoid fragment, proximal ulna, a distal ulna fragment, proximal radius, cuneiform and scapula, from Trojanovo, Bulgaria. It is slightly larger than the greylag goose. The ulnar condyle is rounded near to the shoulder and longer than the medio-lateral axis. The internal ligament is also rounded, the external anconeus sulcus on the caudal side is quite wide, the coracoid is larger than other Anser, the scapular fossa has a diameter that is equal to the horizontal and vertical dimensions, and the phalanx I surface is wide. The describers suggest that these traits verify assignment to Anser
