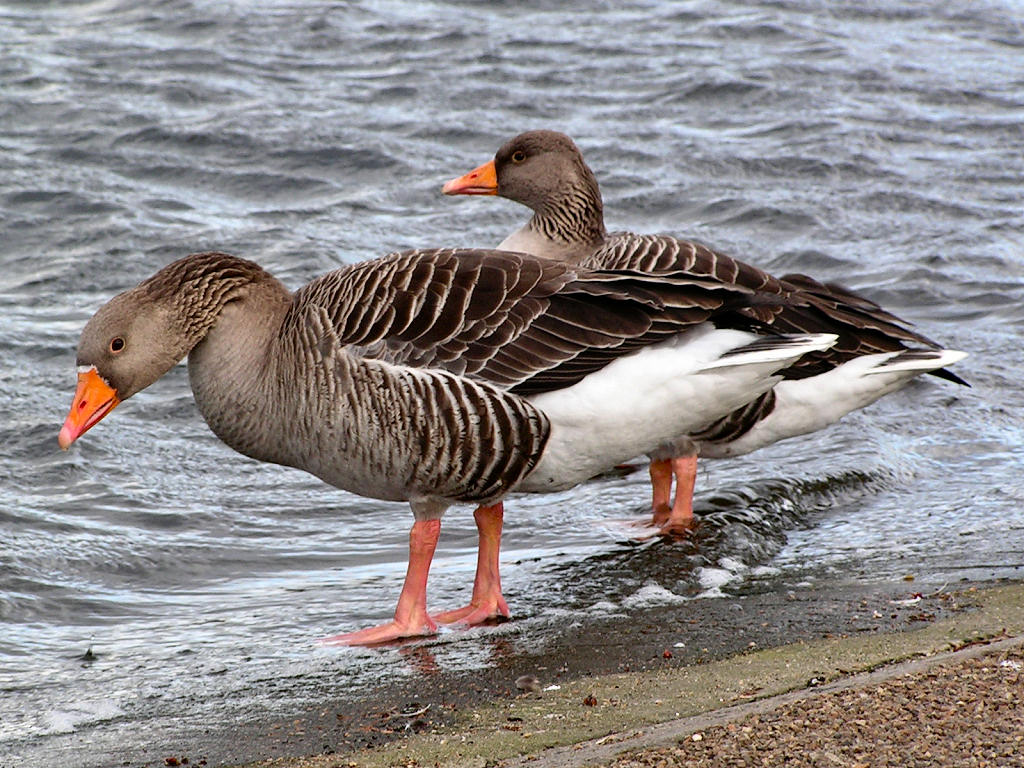
- Pair of greylag geese, Anser anser

Scientific classification
- Kingdom: Animalia
- Phylum: Chordata
- Class: Aves
- Order: Anseriformes
- Family: Anatidae
- Subfamily: Anserinae
- Tribe: Anserini; Vigors 1825
- Genus: Anser; Brisson, 1760

Type species
- Anas anser Linnaeus, 1758

Species
- Anser albifrons; Anser anser; Anser brachyrhynchus; Anser caerulescens; Anser canagicus; Anser cygnoides; Anser fabalis; Anser erythropus; Anser indicus; Anser rossii; Anser serrirostris; and see text

Synonyms
- Chen Boie, 1822 (but see text); Cygnopsis Brandt, 1836; Cycnopsis Agassiz, 1846 (emendation); Eulabeia Reichenbach, 1852; Philacte Bannister, 1870; Heterochen Short, 1970 (but see text)

= Anser (bird) =

Anser Temporal range: Miocene-Holocene

Genus of birds

Anser is a waterfowl genus that includes the grey geese and the white geese. It belongs to the true goose and swan subfamily of Anserinae under the family of Anatidae. The genus has a Holarctic distribution, with at least one species breeding in any open, wet habitats in the subarctic and cool temperate regions of the Northern Hemisphere in summer. Some also breed farther south, reaching into warm temperate regions. They mostly migrate south in winter, typically to regions in the temperate zone between the January 0 °C (32 °F) and 5 °C (41 °F) isotherms.

The genus contains 11 living species.

== Description ==
The species of this genus span nearly the whole range of true goose shapes and sizes. The largest are the bean, greylag and swan geese at up to around 4 kg (9 lb) in weight (with domestic forms far exceeding this), and the smallest are the lesser white-fronted and Ross's geese, which range from about 1.3 to 2.3 kg (3–5 lb).

All have legs and feet that are pink or orange, and bills that are pink, orange, black, or patterned in a combination of these colours. All have white under- and upper-tail coverts, and some have some extent of white on their heads. The neck, body and wings are grey or white, with black or blackish primary—and also often secondary—remiges (pinions). The three species of "white geese" (emperor, snow and Ross's geese) were formerly treated as a separate genus Chen, but are now generally included in Anser, as their exclusion would leave Anser paraphyletic with the bar-headed goose A. indicus being basal in the genus. The closely related "black" geese in the genus Branta differ in having black legs, and generally darker body plumage.

== Systematics, taxonomy and evolution ==
The genus Anser was introduced by the French zoologist Mathurin Jacques Brisson in 1760. The name comes from the Latin word anser meaning "goose" used as the specific epithet for the greylag goose (Anas anser) introduced by Linnaeus in 1758, that epithet was repeated to become its generic name as the type species.

=== Phylogeny ===
The evolutionary relationships between Anser geese have been difficult to resolve because of their rapid radiation during the Pleistocene and frequent hybridisation. In 2016 Ottenburghs and colleagues published a study that established the phylogenetic relationships between the species by comparing exonic DNA sequences; a further analysis by the same group in 2023 refined the relationships in the bean goose complex, with pink-footed goose closest to taiga bean goose, rather than tundra bean goose as had been thought before.

- Anser
  - Bar-headed goose (Anser indicus)
  - - - Emperor goose (Anser canagicus)
      - - Ross's goose (Anser rossii)
        - Snow goose (Anser caerulescens)
    - - Greylag goose (Anser anser)
      - - Swan goose (Anser cygnoides)
        - - - Tundra bean goose (Anser serrirostris)
            - - Pink-footed goose (Anser brachyrhynchus)
              - Taiga bean goose (Anser fabalis)
          - - Greater white-fronted goose (Anser albifrons)
            - Lesser white-fronted goose (Anser erythropus)

=== Species ===
The genus contains 11 species:

Image	Scientific name	Common name	Distribution
	Anser indicus	Bar-headed goose	Breeds in highlands of Central Asia; winters in South Asia, Myanmar and southern China; introduced in Europe
	Anser canagicus	Emperor goose	Near the Pacific coast in Alaska, Russian Far East and Canada
	Anser rossii	Ross's goose	Breeds in northern Canada and Alaska; winters in contiguous United States and northern Mexico
	Anser caerulescens	Snow goose	Breeds in northern Canada, Alaska and Greenland; winters in contiguous United States and northern Mexico
	Anser anser	Greylag goose	Europe, Asia and North Africa
	Anser cygnoides	Swan goose	Breeds in Mongolia, northernmost China and southeastern Russia; winters in southeastern China
	Anser fabalis	Taiga bean goose	Breeds in Russia, Finland, Norway and Sweden; winters in Europe, and Central and East Asia
	Anser brachyrhynchus	Pink-footed goose	Breeds in Iceland, Svalbard and Greenland; winters in northwestern Europe
	Anser serrirostris	Tundra bean goose	Breeds in northern Russia; winters in Europe, and Central and East Asia
	Anser albifrons	Greater white-fronted goose	Breeds in northern Canada, Alaska, Greenland and northern Russia; winters in contiguous United States, northern Mexico, Europe, East Asia, Iraq and near the Caspian Sea
	Anser erythropus	Lesser white-fronted goose	Breeds in northern Russia, Finland, Norway and Sweden; winters in East Asia, near the Caspian Sea, and in southeastern and northwestern Europe

Some authorities also treat some subspecies as potential future species splits, notably the Greenland white-fronted goose A. albifrons flavirostris. The three east Asian subspecies of the bean goose complex (currently treated as A. fabalis johanseni, A. fabalis middendorfii, and A. serrirostris serrirostris) also await genetic analysis to discern their affinities.

=== Fossil record ===
Numerous fossil species have been allocated to this genus. As the true geese are near-impossible to assign osteologically to genus, this must be viewed with caution. It can be assumed with limited certainty that European fossils from known inland sites belong into Anser. As species related to the Canada goose have been described from the Late Miocene onwards in North America too, sometimes from the same localities as the presumed grey geese, it casts serious doubt on the correct generic assignment of the supposed North American fossil geese. Heterochen = Anser pratensis seems to differ profoundly from other species of Anser and might be placed into a different genus; alternatively, it might have been a unique example of a grey goose adapted for perching in trees. (Note: Short (1970) considers this bird to be somewhat reminiscent of geese and swans, shelducks, and the Cairinini or "perching ducks".) (Note: The Cairinini or "perching ducks" are now known to be a paraphyletic assemblage of miscellaneous waterfowl whose morphological similarities are the product of convergent evolution towards being able to perch in trees (Livezey 1986).)

- †Anser atavus Fraas 1870 (Middle/Late Miocene of Bavaria, Germany) – sometimes in Cygnus
- †Anser arenosus Bickart 1990 (Late Miocene of Arizona, USA)
- †Anser arizonae Bickart 1990 (Late Miocene of Arizona, USA)
- †Anser cygniformis Fraas 1870 (Late Miocene of Steinheim, Germany)
- †Anser oeningensis (Meyer 1865) Milne-Edwards 1867b [Anas oeningensis Meyer 1865] (Late Miocene of Oehningen, Switzerland)
- †Anser thraciensis Burchak-Abramovich & Nikolov 1984 (Late Miocene/Early Pliocene of Trojanovo, Bulgaria)
- †Anser pratensis (Short 1970) [Heterochen pratensis Short 1970] (Early Pliocene of Nebraska, USA)
- †Anser pressus (Brodkorb 1964) [Chen pressa Brodkorb 1964] (Dwarf Snow goose) (Late Pliocene of Idaho, USA)
- †Anser thompsoni Martin & Mengel 1980 (Pliocene of Nebraska, USA)
- †Anser azerbaidzhanicus Serebrovsky 1940 (Early? Pleistocene of Binagady, Azerbaijan)
- †Anser devjatkini Kuročkin 1971 (Pliocene of Mongolia)
- †Anser eldaricus Burchak-Abramovich & Gadzyev 1978 (Miocene of Georgia)
- †Anser tchikoicus Kuročkin 1985 (Pliocene of central Asia)
- †Anser djuktaiensis Zelenkov & Kurochkin 2014 (Late Pleistocene of Yakutia, Russia)
- †Anser subanser Janossy 1982 (Pleistocene of Europe)

The Maltese swan Cygnus equitum was occasionally placed into Anser, and Anser condoni is a synonym of Cygnus paloregonus. A goose fossil from the early-middle Pleistocene of El Salvador is highly similar to Anser; given its age it is likely to belong to an extant genus, though biogeography indicates Branta as another potential candidate.

Anser scaldii Beneden 1872 nomen nudum (Late Miocene of Antwerp, Belgium), based on a right humerus, was reassigned to the modern Brent goose and suggested to be reworked from later Pleistocene or Holocene deposits.

== Relationship with humans and conservation status ==
Two species in the genus are of major commercial importance, having been domesticated as poultry: European domesticated geese are derived from the greylag goose, and Chinese and some African domesticated geese are derived from the swan goose.

Most species are hunted to a greater or lesser extent; in some areas, some populations are threatened by over-hunting and habitat loss. Although most species are not considered threatened by the IUCN, the lesser white-fronted goose and swan goose are listed as Vulnerable and the emperor goose is near-threatened.

Other species have benefited from reductions in hunting since the late 19th and early 20th centuries, with most species in western Europe and North America showing marked increases in response to protection. In some cases, this has led to conflicts with farming, when large flocks of geese graze crops in the winter.

== See also ==
- List of recently extinct birds
- Late Quaternary prehistoric birds
- List of fossil bird genera
