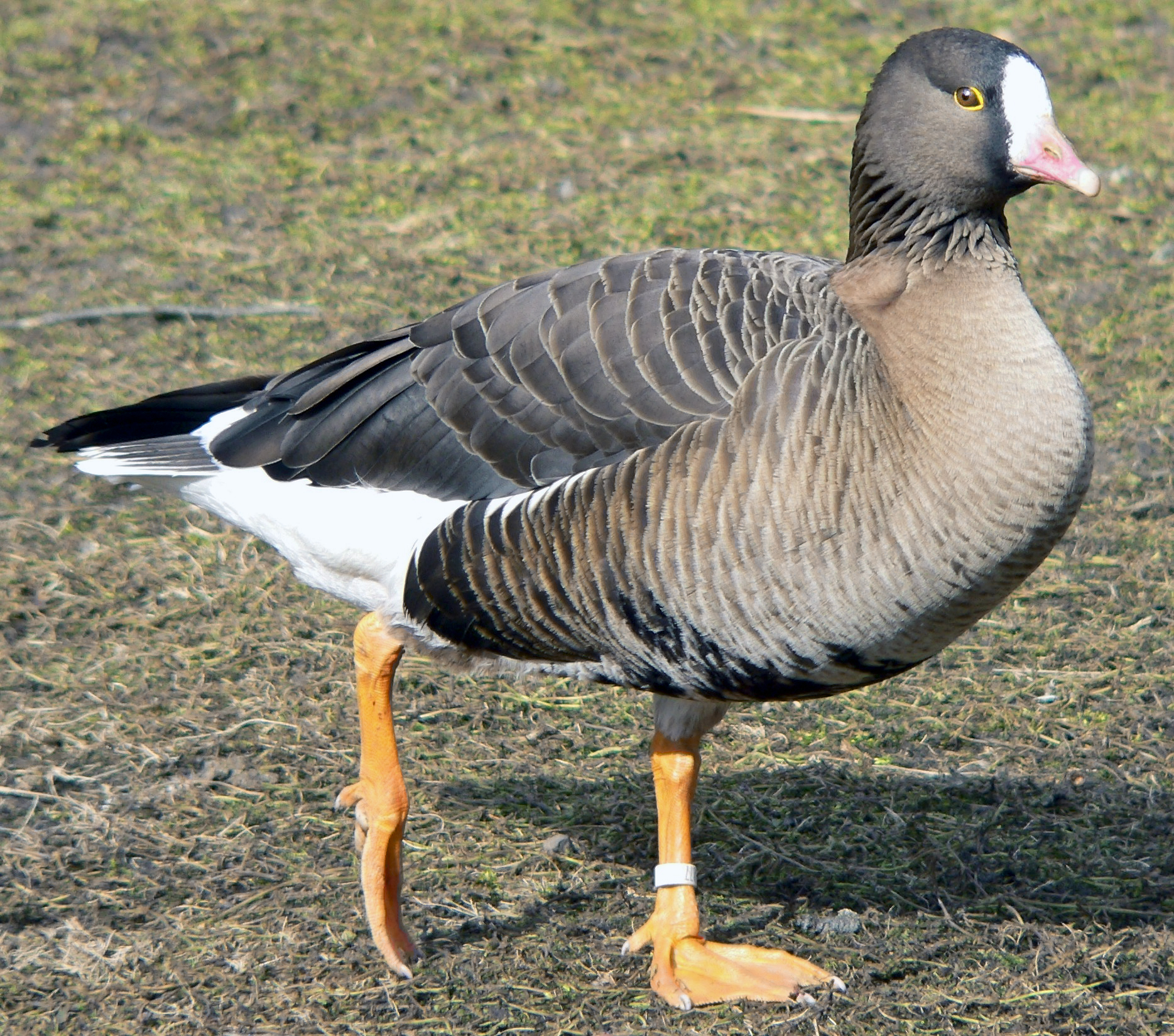

Conservation status
- Vulnerable (IUCN 3.1)

Scientific classification
- Kingdom: Animalia
- Phylum: Chordata
- Class: Aves
- Order: Anseriformes
- Family: Anatidae
- Genus: Anser
- Species: A. erythropus

Binomial name
- Anser erythropus (Linnaeus, 1758)
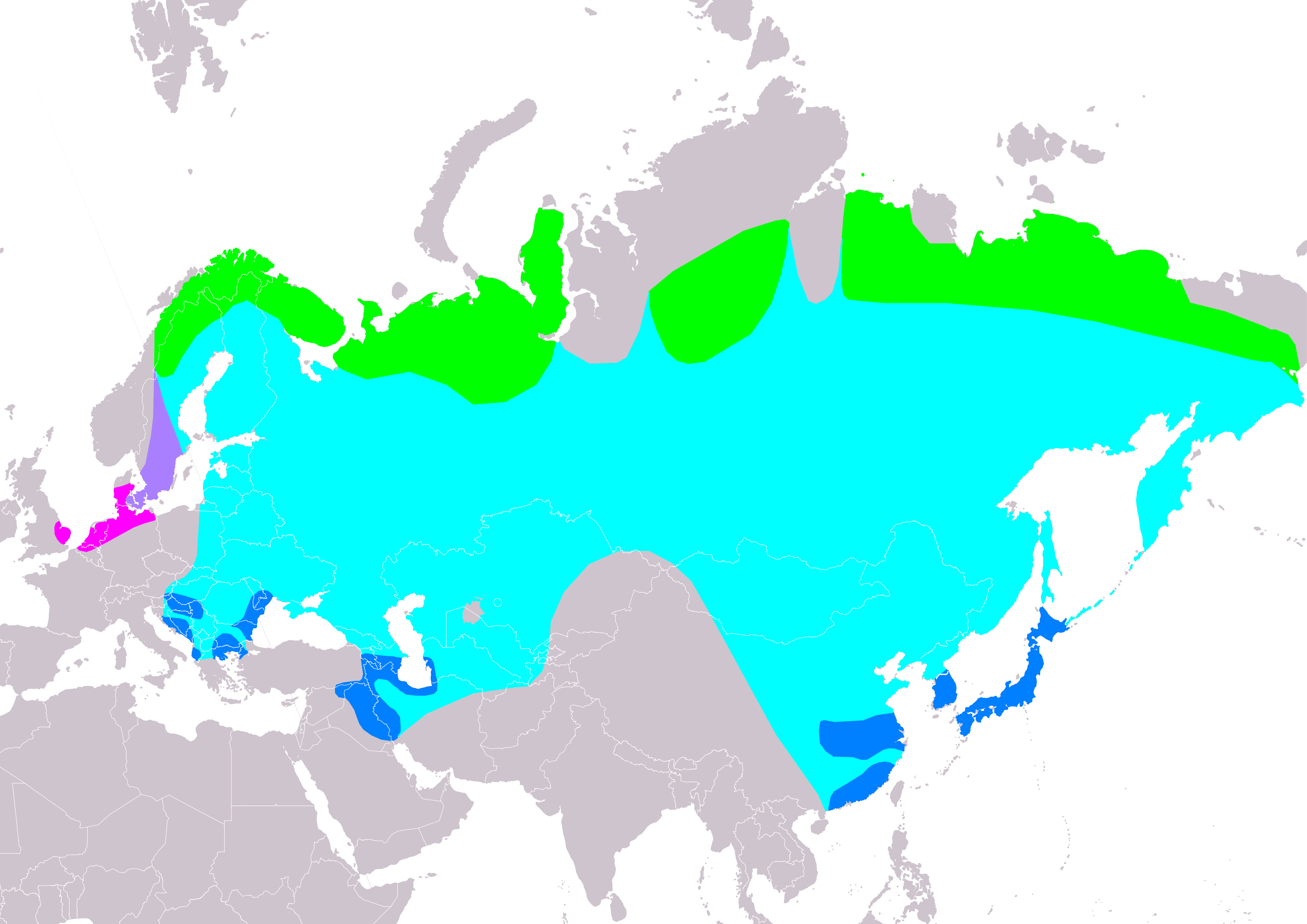
- Range of A. erythropus Breeding Non-breeding Passage Vagrant (seasonality uncertain) Possibly Extant (passage)

Synonyms
- Anas erythropus Linnaeus, 1758

= Lesser white-fronted goose =

Species of bird

The lesser white-fronted goose (Anser erythropus) is a goose closely related to the larger greater white-fronted goose (A. albifrons). It breeds in the northernmost Palearctic, but it is a scarce breeder in Europe, with a reintroduction attempt in Fennoscandia.

== Taxonomy ==
The lesser white-fronted goose was formally described in 1758 by the Swedish naturalist Carl Linnaeus in the tenth edition of his Systema Naturae under the binomial name Anas erythropus. Linnaeus specified the type location as northern Europe but this was restricted to northern Sweden in 1913. The lesser white-fronted goose is now one of 11 species placed in the genus Anser that was introduced by the French zoologist Mathurin Jacques Brisson in 1760. The specific epithet comes from anser, the Latin for "goose", and erythropus, "red-footed", derived from the old Greek eruthros "red" and pous "foot". The species is monotypic: no subspecies are recognised. The lesser white-fronted goose is closely related to the greater white-fronted goose (Anser albifrons).

== Distribution and habitat ==
The lesser white-fronted goose winters further south in Europe and is a rare winter vagrant to Great Britain and India. Individual birds formerly appeared regularly at WWT Slimbridge in Gloucestershire, England, where they inspired Sir Peter Scott to set up The Wildfowl and Wetlands Trust—modern records, however, are far less frequent, a consequence of the species' decline on its European breeding grounds. An attractive species, it is also widely kept in wildfowl collections and, as a result, escapes do occur; individuals seen in summer, or in the company of other feral geese, are likely to be of captive origin.

== Description ==
The two white-fronted goose species differ little other than in size (the lesser, at 53–66 cm (21–26 in) length and with a 120–135 cm (47–53 in) wingspan, is not much bigger than a mallard (Anas platyrhynchos)), but both may be readily distinguished from the greylag goose by their bright orange legs and their mouse-coloured upper wing-coverts. The greylag goose has a flesh-coloured bill and legs and the upper wing-coverts are bluish-grey.

Both white-fronted goose species have a very conspicuous white face and broad black bars which cross the belly.

Adult lesser white-fronted geese, as well as being smaller than greater white-fronted geese, have an obvious yellow eye-ring and the white facial blaze goes up to the crown.

== Conservation ==
The lesser white-fronted goose is considered an endangered species, but there are programmes to reintroduce animals into the wild to strengthen the population. Additionally it is one of the species to which the Agreement on the Conservation of African-Eurasian Migratory Waterbirds (AEWA) applies.

=== Fennoscandian population ===
This genetically distinct population is now estimated at 20 breeding pairs or 60–80 total individuals at most. They breed in northern Norway and overwinter in Greece, Bulgaria and Turkey. There is a major stop-over site at Hortobágy National Park, Hungary, where the birds spend up to two months during autumn and one month during the spring migration.

Another part of the Fennoscandian population breeds in northern Sweden. The population size in 2015 was estimated to about 15 breeding pairs or 40–50 individuals in all. These birds follow a western migration route and spend the winter in Netherlands and Germany. According to the IUCN Red List in 2015, the conservation status of this population is Critically Endangered.

== Gallery ==
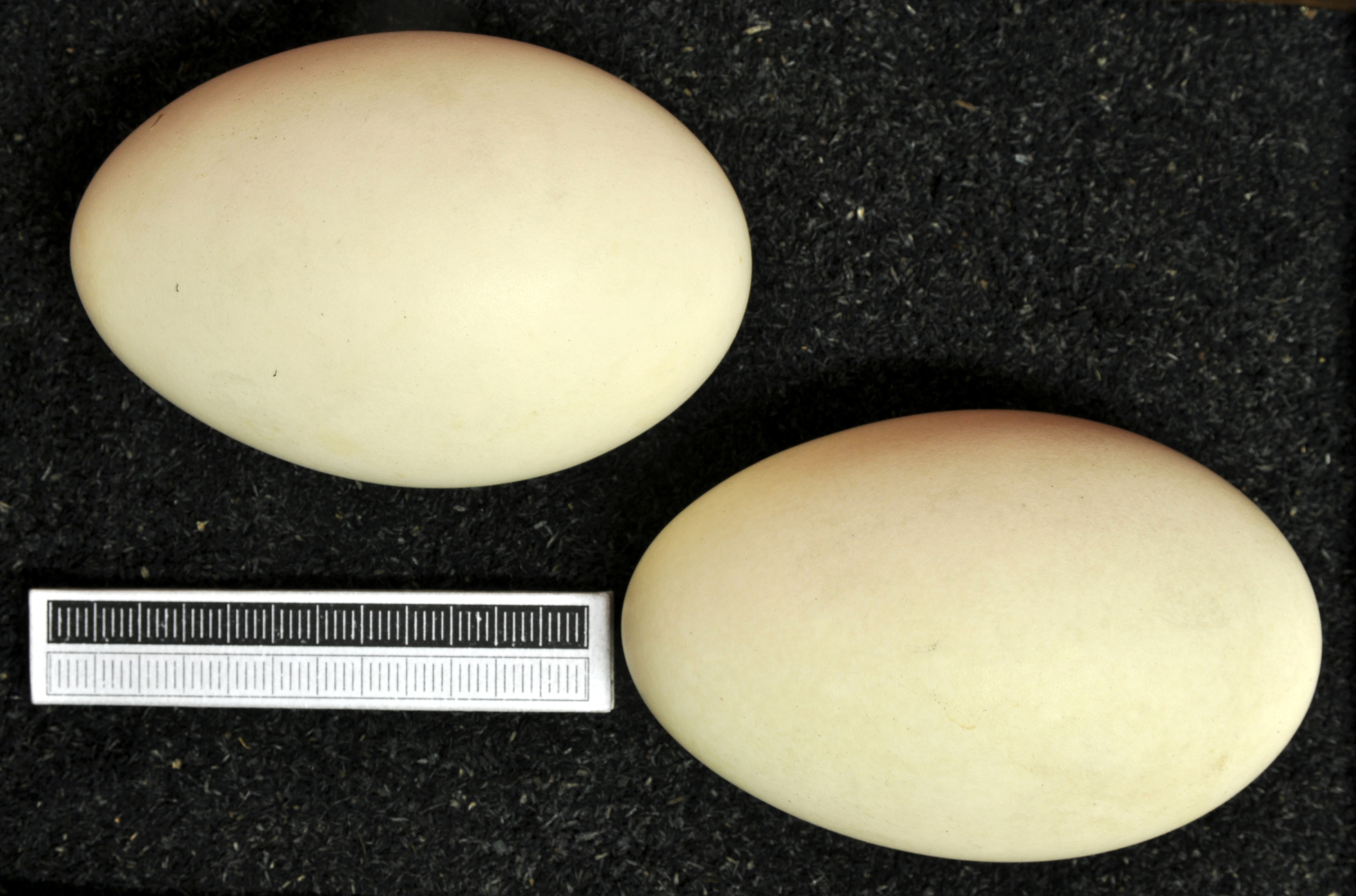
Eggs, Collection Museum Wiesbaden

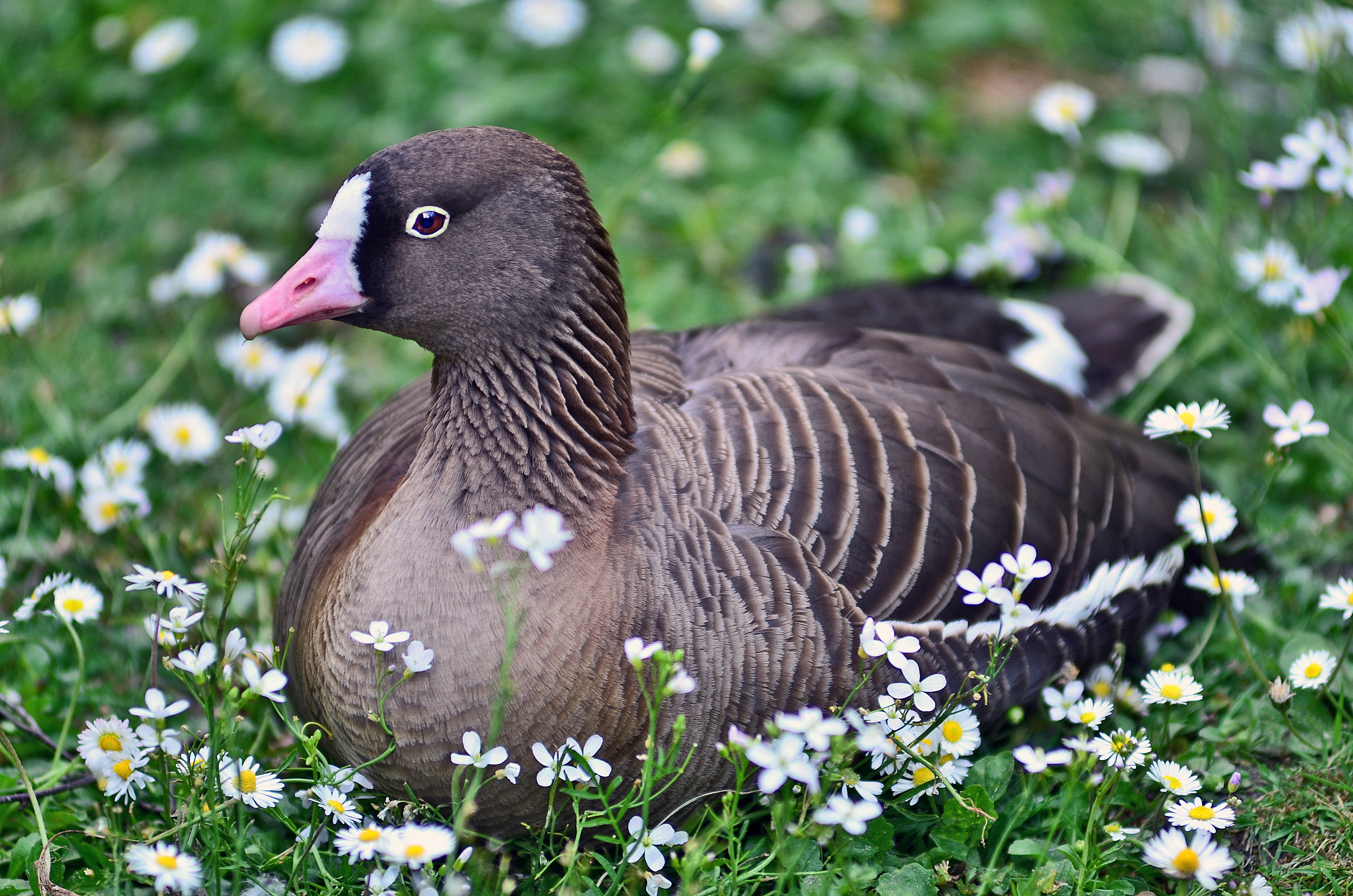
A lesser white-fronted goose at Weltvogelpark Walsrode
