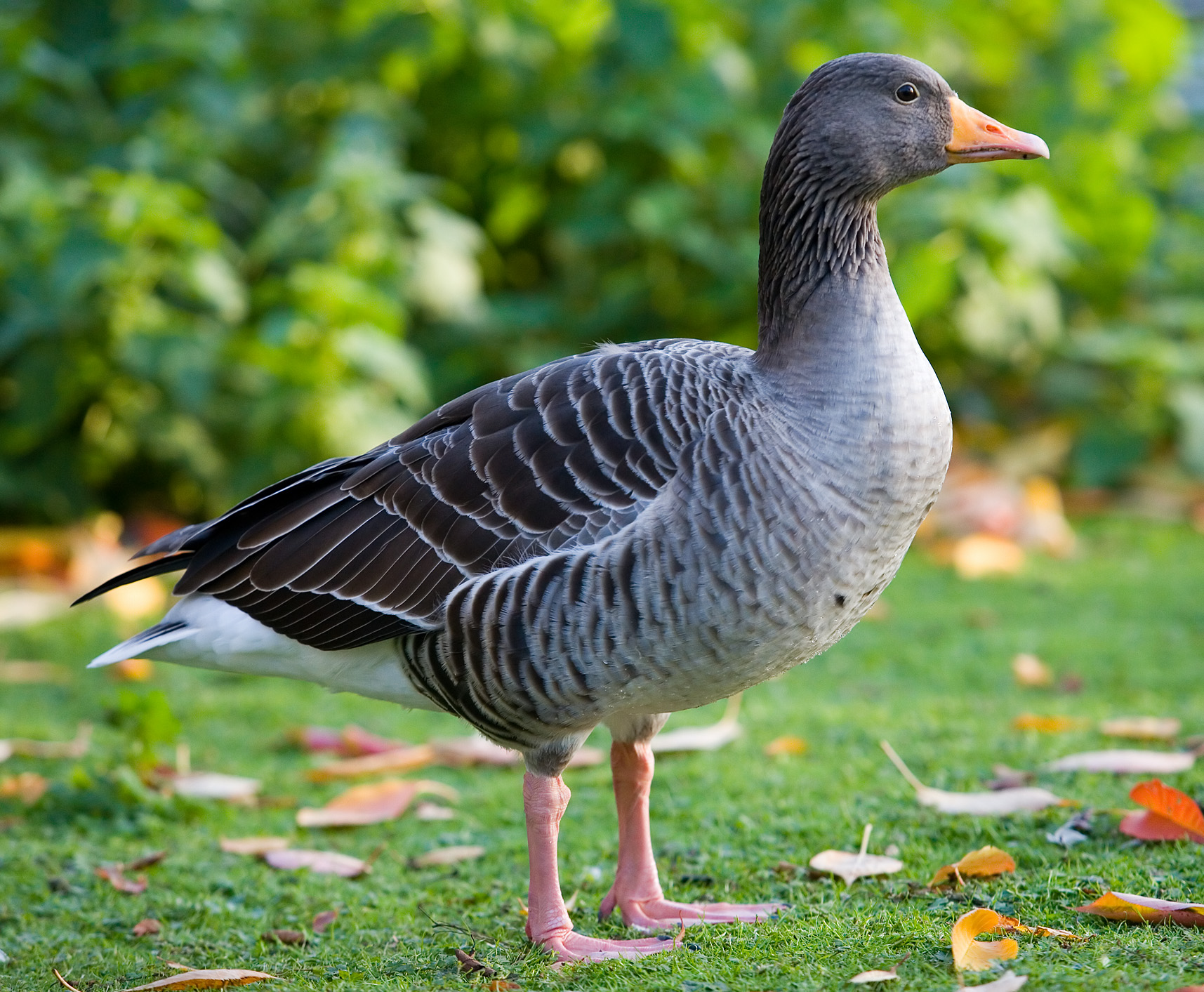
- In St James's Park, London, England

Conservation status
- Least Concern (IUCN 3.1)

Scientific classification
- Kingdom: Animalia
- Phylum: Chordata
- Class: Aves
- Order: Anseriformes
- Family: Anatidae
- Genus: Anser
- Species: A. anser

Binomial name
- Anser anser (Linnaeus, 1758)

Subspecies
- A. a. anser (Linnaeus, 1758) Western greylag goose; A. a. rubrirostris R. Swinhoe, 1871 Eastern greylag goose
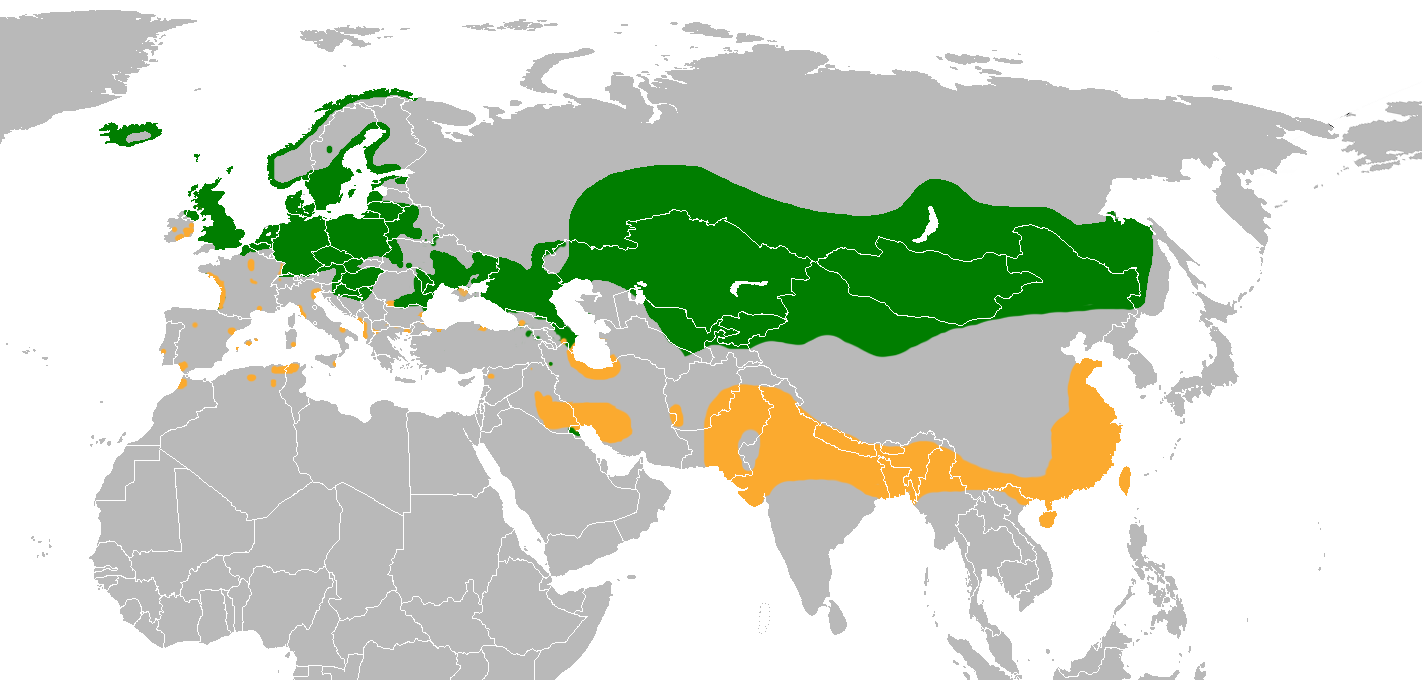
- Range map of greylag goose Green: breeding, orange: non-breeding

Synonyms
- Anas anser Linnaeus, 1758; Anser cinereus Meyer

Audio
- Calls of two flying geese in the midnight in the Netherlands

= Greylag goose =

Greylag goose Temporal range: Piacenzian–present (Note: Fossil remains are known from between 2.59 and 0.13 million years ago.)

Species of bird

The greylag goose (Anser anser) is a species of large goose in the waterfowl family Anatidae and the type species of the genus Anser. It has mottled and barred grey and white plumage and an orange beak and pink legs. A large bird, it measures between 74 and 91 centimetres (29 and 36 in) in length, with an average weight of 3.3 kilograms (7 lb 4 oz). Its distribution is widespread, with birds from the north of its range in Europe and Asia often migrating southwards to spend the winter in warmer places, although many populations are resident, even in the north. It is the ancestor of most breeds of domestic goose, having been domesticated at least as early as 1360 BCE. The genus name and specific epithet are from anser, the Latin for "goose". In the USA, its name has been spelled "graylag".

Greylag geese travel to their northerly breeding grounds in spring, nesting on moorlands, in marshes, around lakes and on coastal islands. They normally mate for life and nest on the ground among vegetation. A clutch of three to five eggs is laid; the female incubates the eggs and both parents defend and rear the young. The birds stay together as a family group, migrating southwards in autumn as part of a flock, and separating the following year. During the winter they occupy semi-aquatic habitats, estuaries, marshes and flooded fields, feeding on grass and often consuming agricultural crops. Some populations, such as those in southern England and in urban areas across the species' range, are primarily resident and occupy the same area year-round.

== Taxonomy ==
The greylag goose was formally described in 1758 by the Swedish naturalist Carl Linnaeus in the tenth edition of his Systema Naturae. He placed it with the ducks in the genus Anas and coined the binomial name Anas anser. The specific epithet is Latin meaning "goose". The greylag goose is now one of 11 geese placed in the genus Anser that was erected in 1860 by the French naturalist Mathurin Jacques Brisson. It is the type species of the genus.

Two subspecies are recognised: A. a. anser, the western greylag goose, which breeds in Iceland and northern and central Europe, and A. a. rubrirostris, the eastern greylag goose, which breeds in Romania, Turkey, and Russia eastwards to northeastern China. The two subspecies intergrade where their ranges meet. The greylag goose sometimes hybridises with other species of goose, including the barnacle goose (Branta leucopsis) and the Canada goose (Branta canadensis), and occasionally with the mute swan (Cygnus olor). The greylag goose was one of the first animals to be domesticated; this happened at least 3,000 years ago in Ancient Egypt. Domesticated birds are sometimes known as "A. a. domesticus", though this is not an accepted subspecies name. As the domestic goose is derived from the greylag goose, they are able to interbreed, with the offspring sharing characteristics of both wild and domestic birds.

== Description ==
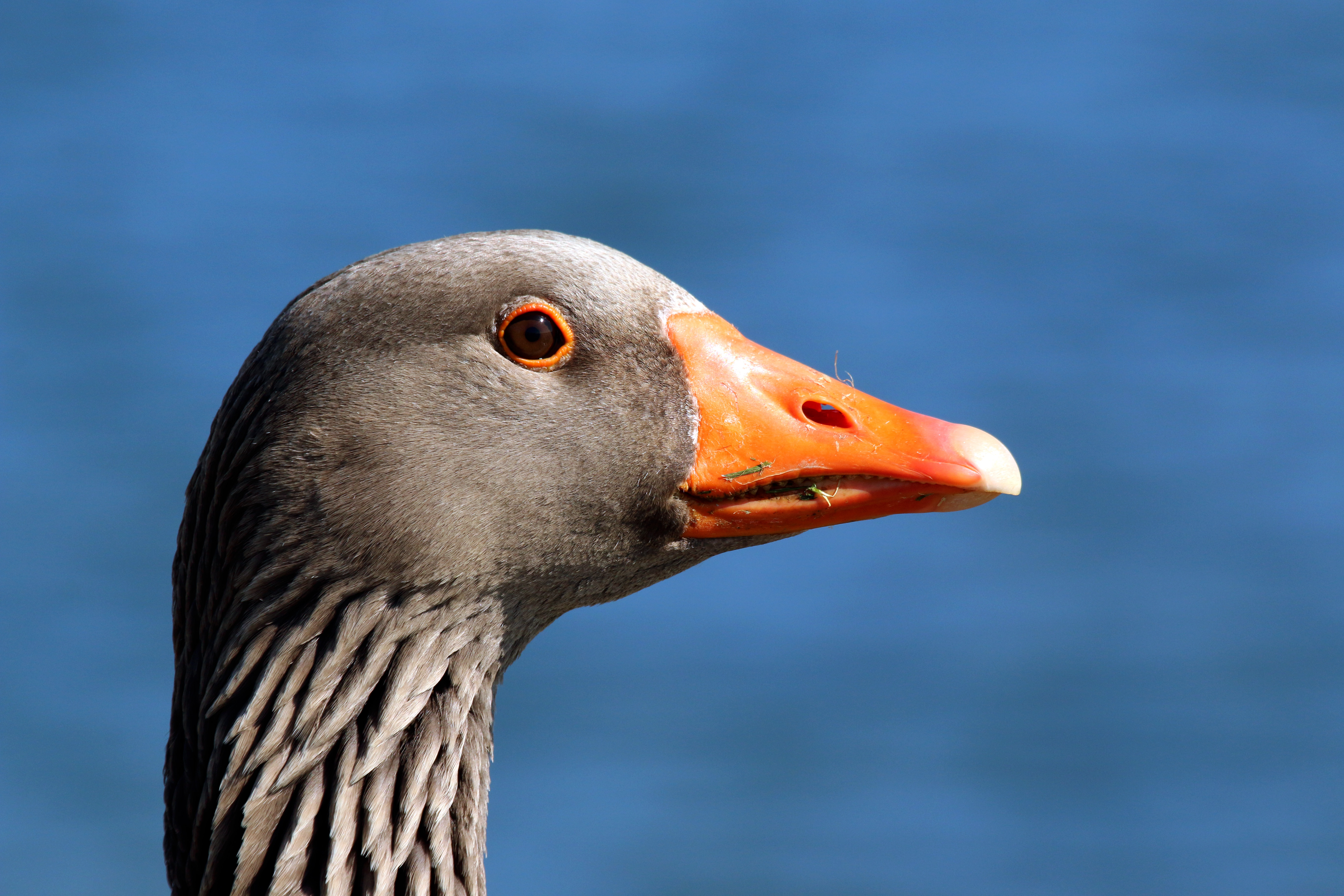
Head of an adult

The greylag is the largest and bulkiest of the grey geese of the genus Anser, but is more lightly built and agile than its domestic relative. It has a rotund, bulky body, a thick and long neck, and a large head and bill. It has pink legs and feet, and an orange or pink bill with a white or brown nail (hard horny material at tip of upper mandible). It is 74 to 91 centimetres (29 to 36 in) long with a wing length of 41.2 to 48 centimetres (16 1/4 to 19 in). It has a tail 6.2 to 6.9 centimetres (2 7/16 to 2 11/16 in), a bill of 6.4 to 6.9 centimetres (2 1/2 to 2 11/16 in) long, and a tarsus of 7.1 to 9.3 centimetres (2 13/16 to 3 11/16 in). It weighs 2.16 to 4.56 kilograms (4 lb 12 oz to 10 lb 1 oz), with a mean weight of around 3.3 kilograms (7 lb 4 oz). The wingspan is 147 to 180 centimetres (58 to 71 in). Males are generally larger than females, with the sexual dimorphism more pronounced in the eastern subspecies A. a. rubirostris, which is larger than the nominate subspecies on average.

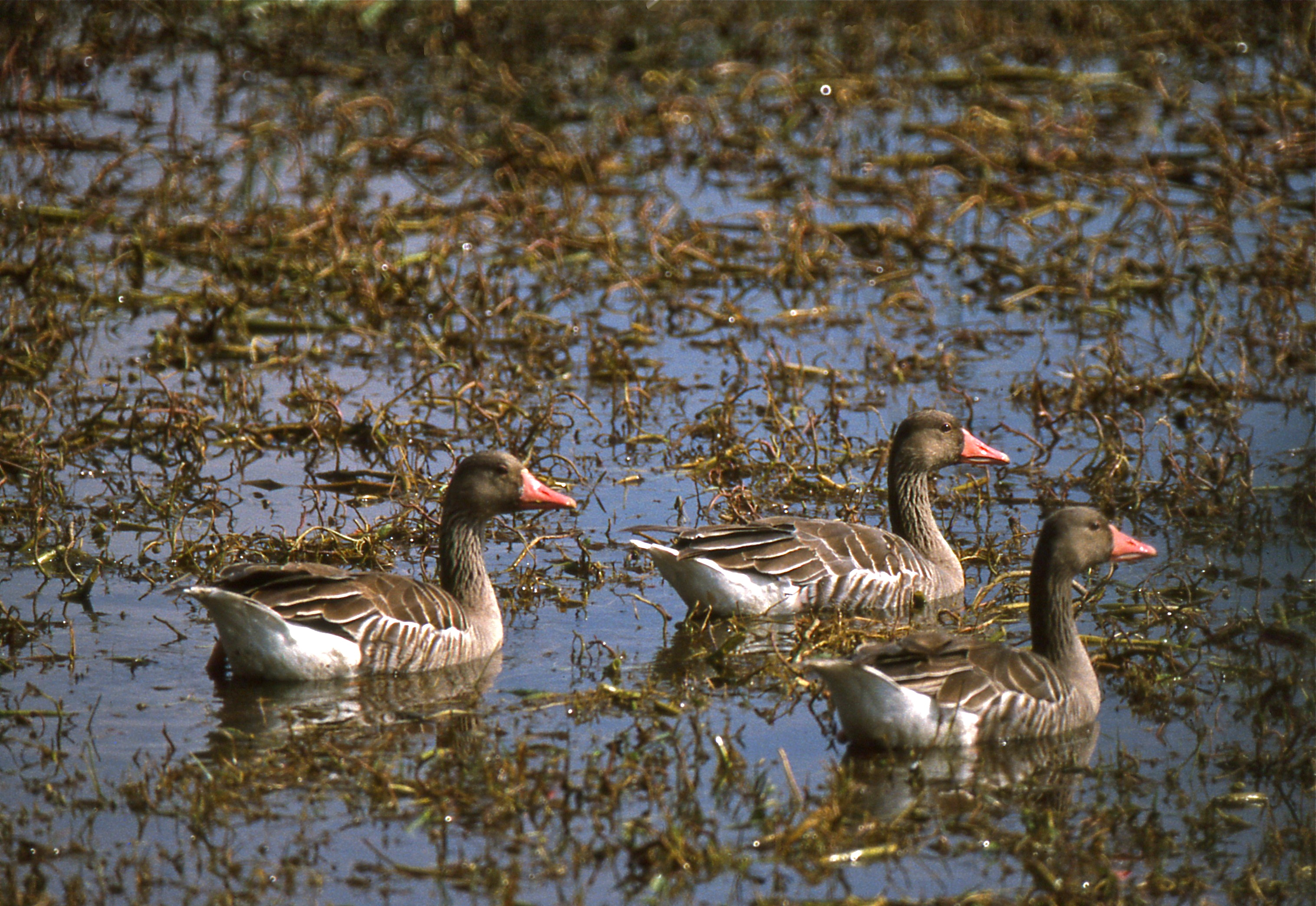
Three eastern greylag geese (A. a. rubrirostris) at Keoladeo National Park in Rajasthan, India

The plumage of the greylag goose is greyish brown, with a darker head and paler breast and belly with a variable amount of black spotting. It has a pale grey forewing and rump which are noticeable when the bird is in flight or stretches its wings on the ground. It has a white line bordering its upper flanks, and its wing coverts are light coloured, contrasting with its darker flight feathers. Its plumage is patterned by the pale fringes of the feathers. Juveniles differ mostly in their lack of black speckling on the breast and belly and by their greyish legs. Adults have a distinctive 'concertina' pattern of folds in the feathers on their necks.

The greylag goose has a loud cackling call similar to that of the domestic goose, "aahng-ung-ung", uttered on the ground or in flight. There are various subtle variations used under different circumstances, and individual geese seem to be able to identify other known geese by their voices. The sound made by a flock of geese resembles the baying of hounds. Goslings chirp or whistle lightly, and adults hiss if threatened or angered.

== Distribution and habitat ==
This species has a Palearctic distribution. The nominate subspecies breeds in Iceland, Norway, Sweden, Denmark, Finland, the Baltic States, northern Russia, Poland, eastern Hungary, Romania, Germany and the Netherlands. It also breeds locally in the United Kingdom, Belgium, Austria, the Czech Republic, Slovakia, North Macedonia and some other European countries. The eastern subspecies extends eastwards across a broad swathe of Asia to China. Historically, European birds generally migrated southwards to spend winter in southern Europe and North Africa, but in recent decades many instead overwinter in or near their breeding range, even in Scandinavia. Asian birds migrate to Azerbaijan, Iran, Pakistan, northern India, Bangladesh and eastward to China. Greylags also occur as very rare winter migrants to South Korea and Japan.

In North America, there are both feral domestic geese, which are similar to greylags, and occasional vagrant greylags. Greylag geese seen in the wild in New Zealand probably originated from the escape of farmyard geese, and a similar situation has occurred in Australia, where feral birds are now established in the east and southeast of the country.

In their breeding quarters, they are found on moors with scattered lochs, in marshes, fens and peat-bogs, besides lakes and on little islands some way out to sea. They like dense ground cover of reeds, rushes, heather, bushes and willow thickets. In their winter quarters, they frequent salt marshes, estuaries, freshwater marshes, steppes, flooded fields, bogs and pasture near lakes, rivers and streams. They also visit agricultural land where they feed on winter cereals, rice, beans or other crops, moving at night to shoals and sand-banks on the coast, mud-banks in estuaries or secluded lakes. Large numbers of immature birds congregate each year to moult on the Rone Islands near Gotland in the Baltic Sea.

Since the 1950s, increases in winter temperatures have resulted in greylag geese breeding in northern and central Europe, reducing their winter migration distances or even becoming resident. Wintering grounds closer to home can therefore be exploited, meaning that the geese can return to set up breeding territories earlier the following spring.

In Great Britain, their numbers had declined as a breeding bird, retreating north to breed wild only in the Outer Hebrides and the northern mainland of Scotland. However, during the 20th century, feral populations have been established elsewhere, and they have now re-colonised much of England. These populations are increasingly coming into contact and merging.

The greylag goose has become a pest species in several areas where its population has increased sharply. In Norway, the number of greylag geese is estimated to have increased three- to five-fold between 1995 and 2015. As a consequence, problems for farmers caused by goose grazing on farmland have increased considerably. This problem is also evident for the pink-footed goose. In the Orkney islands the population has increased dramatically: there were 300 breeding pairs, increasing to 10,000 in 2009, and 64,000 in 2019. Due to extensive damage caused to crops, the hunting season for the greylag goose in the Orkney islands is now most of the year.

== Behaviour ==
Greylag geese are largely herbivorous and feed chiefly on grasses. Short, actively growing grass is more nutritious and greylag geese are often found grazing in pastures with sheep or cows. Because of its low nutrient status, they need to feed for much of their time; the herbage passes rapidly through the gut and is voided frequently. The tubers of sea clubrush (Bolboschoenus maritimus) are also taken as well as fruits and water plants such as duckweed (Lemna) and floating sweetgrass (Glyceria fluitans). In wintertime they eat grass and leaves but also glean grain on cereal stubbles and sometimes feed on growing crops, especially during the night. They have been known to feed on oats, wheat, barley, buckwheat, lentils, peas and root crops. Acorns are sometimes consumed, and on the coast, seagrass (Zostera sp.) may be eaten. In the 1920s in Britain, the pink-footed goose "discovered" that potatoes were edible and started feeding on waste potatoes. The greylag followed suit in the 1940s and now regularly searches for tubers on ploughed fields. They also consume small fish, amphibians, crustaceans, molluscs and insects.

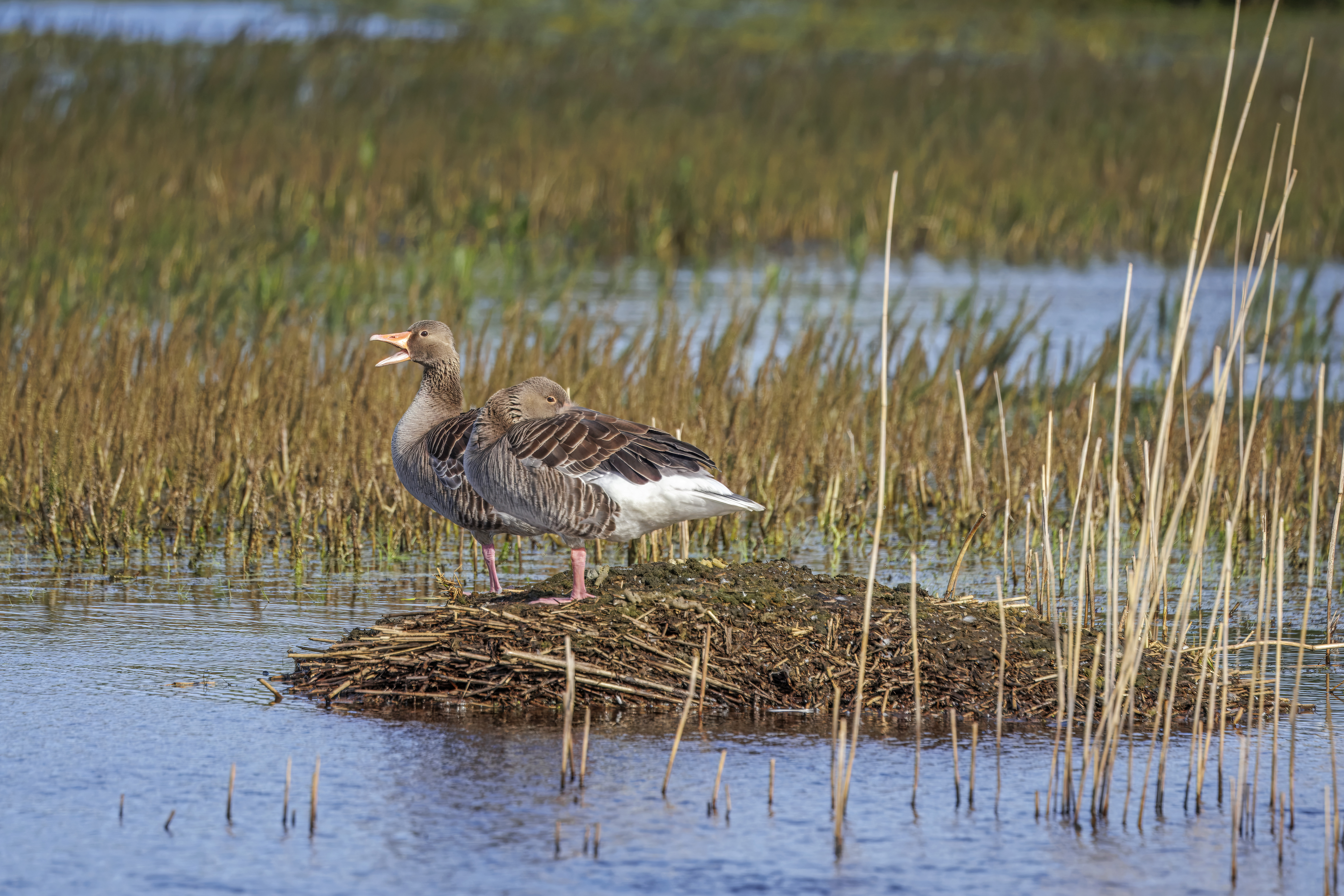
pair on nest, Denmark

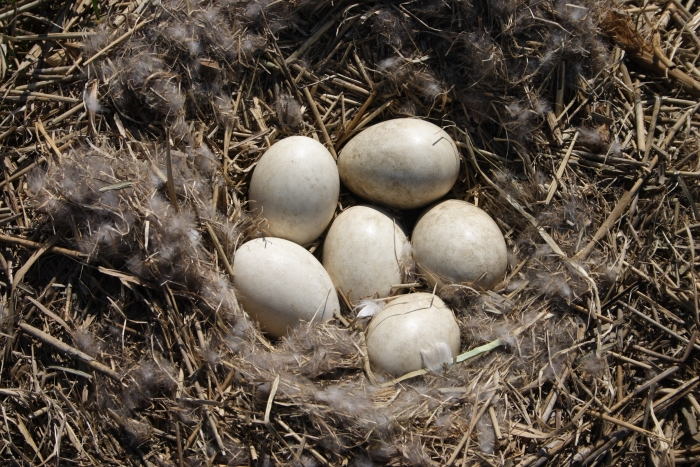
eggs in the nest, Hungary

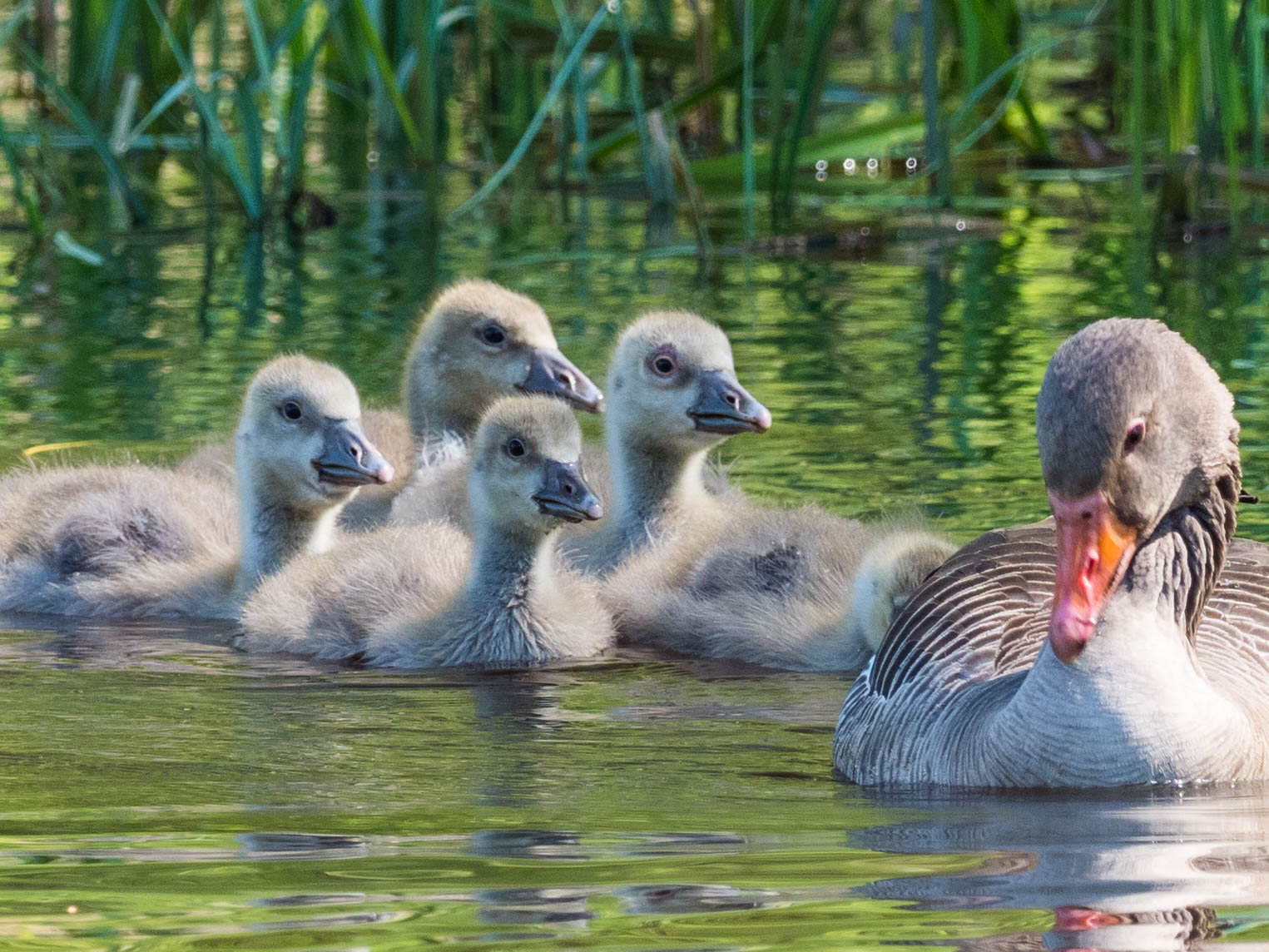
female with goslings, Sweden

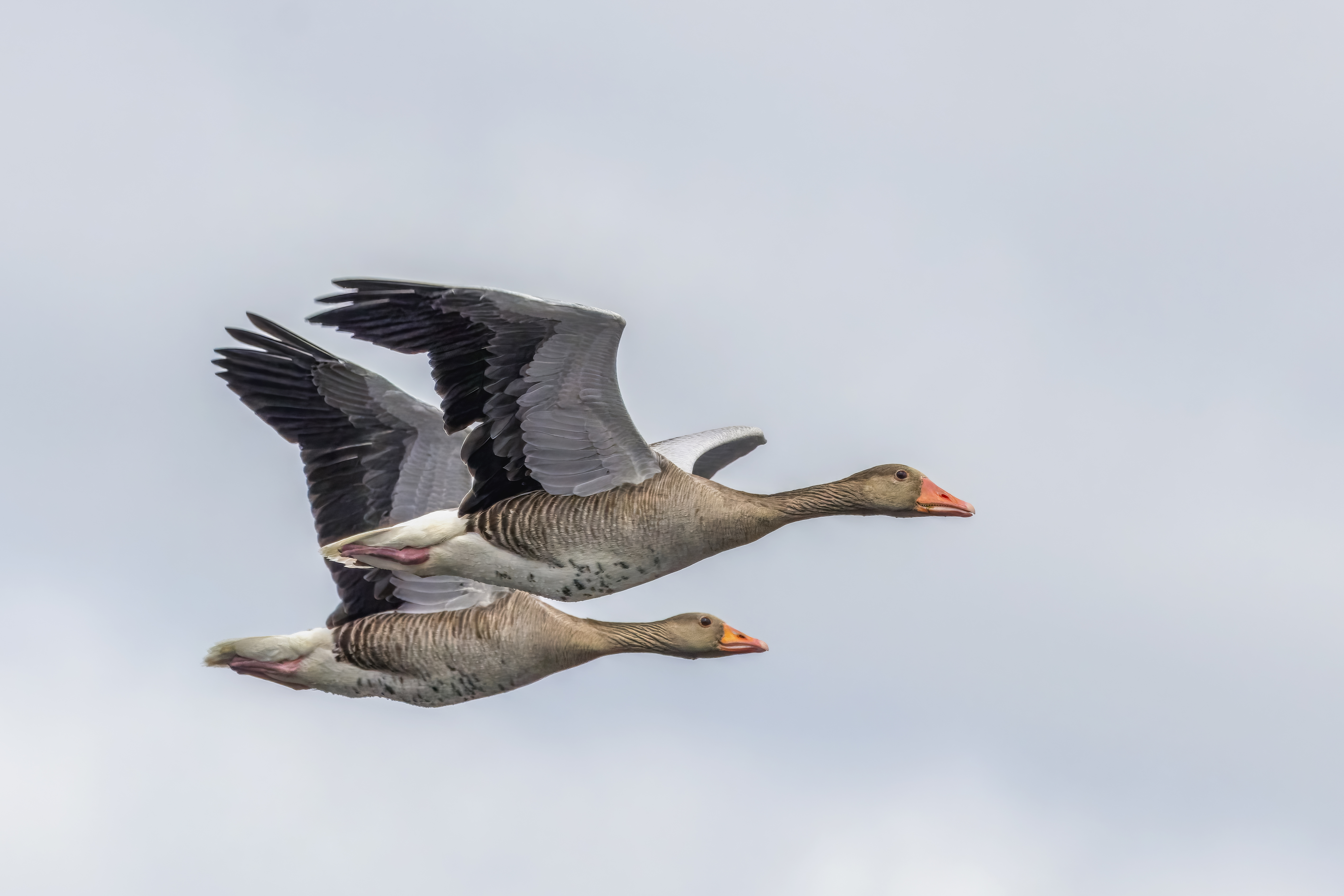
pair flying in Luxembourg

Greylag geese tend to pair bond in long-term monogamous relationships. Most such pairs are probably life-long partnerships, though 5 to 8% of the pairs separate and re-mate with other geese. Birds in heterosexual pairs may engage in promiscuous behavior, despite the opposition of their mates.

Homosexual pairs are common (14 to 20% of the pairs may be ganders, depending on flock), and share the characteristics of heterosexual pairs with the exceptions that the bonds appear to be closer, based on the intensity of their displays. Same-sex pairs also engage in courtship and sexual relations, and often assume high-ranking positions in the flock as a result of their superior strength and courage, leading some to speculate that they may serve as guardians of the flock. The sexual preference of the birds is generally flexible, as more than half of widowers re-pair with a bird of the opposite sex.

The nest is on the ground among heather, rushes, dwarf shrubs or reeds, or on a raft of floating vegetation. It is built from pieces of reed, sprigs of heather, grasses and moss, mixed with small feathers and down. A typical clutch is four to six eggs, but fewer eggs or larger numbers are not unusual. The eggs are creamy-white at first but soon become stained, and average 85 by 58 millimetres (3 3/8 by 2 5/16 in). They are mostly laid on successive days and incubation starts after the last one is laid. The female does the incubation, which lasts about twenty-eight days, while the male remains on guard somewhere near. The chicks are precocial and able to leave the nest soon after hatching. Both parents are involved in their care and they soon learn to peck at food and become fully-fledged at eight or nine weeks, about the same time as their parents regain their ability to fly after moulting their main wing and tail feathers a month earlier. Immature birds undergo a similar moult, and move to traditional, safe locations before doing so because of their vulnerability while flightless.

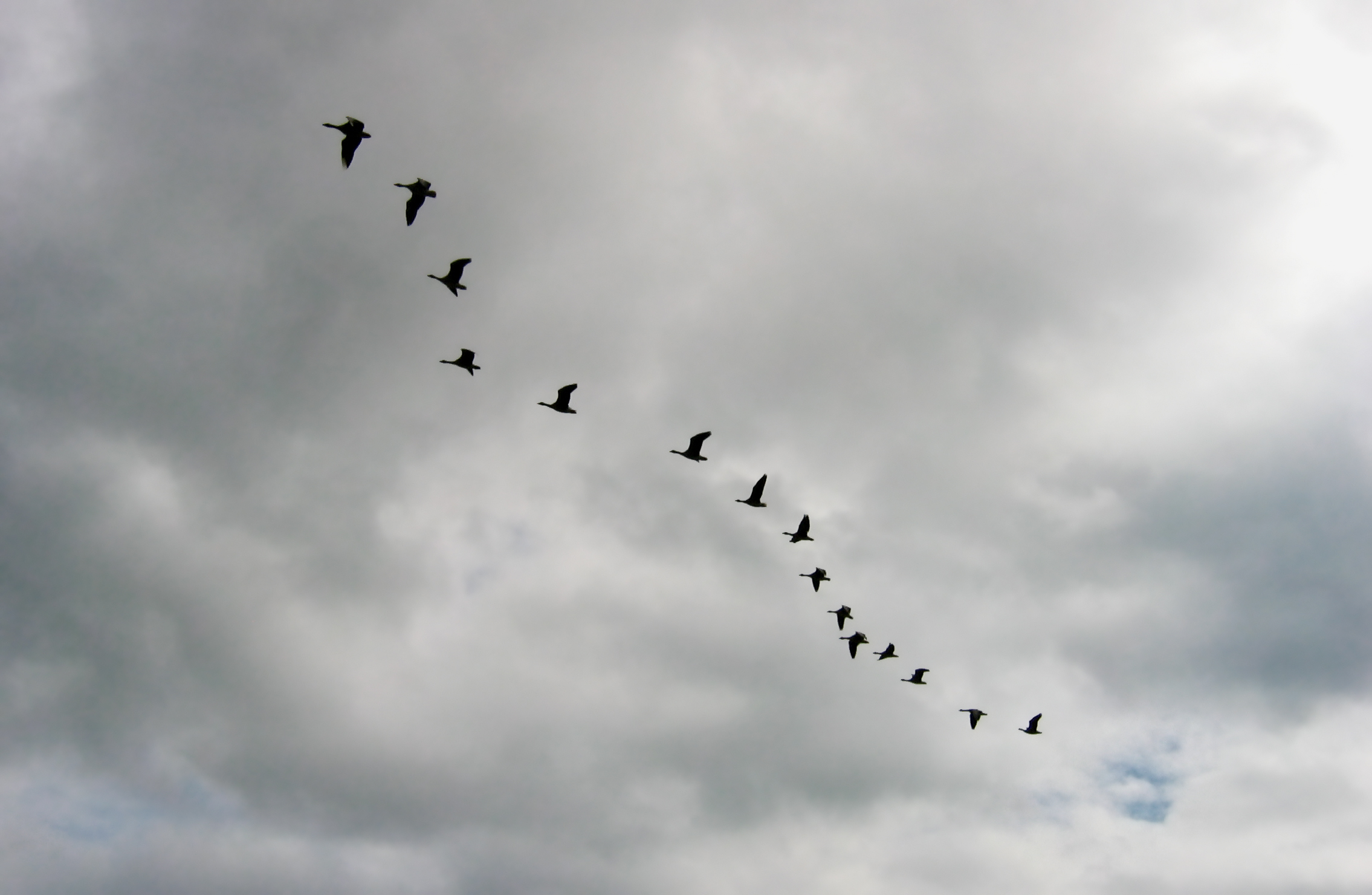
Migrating flock

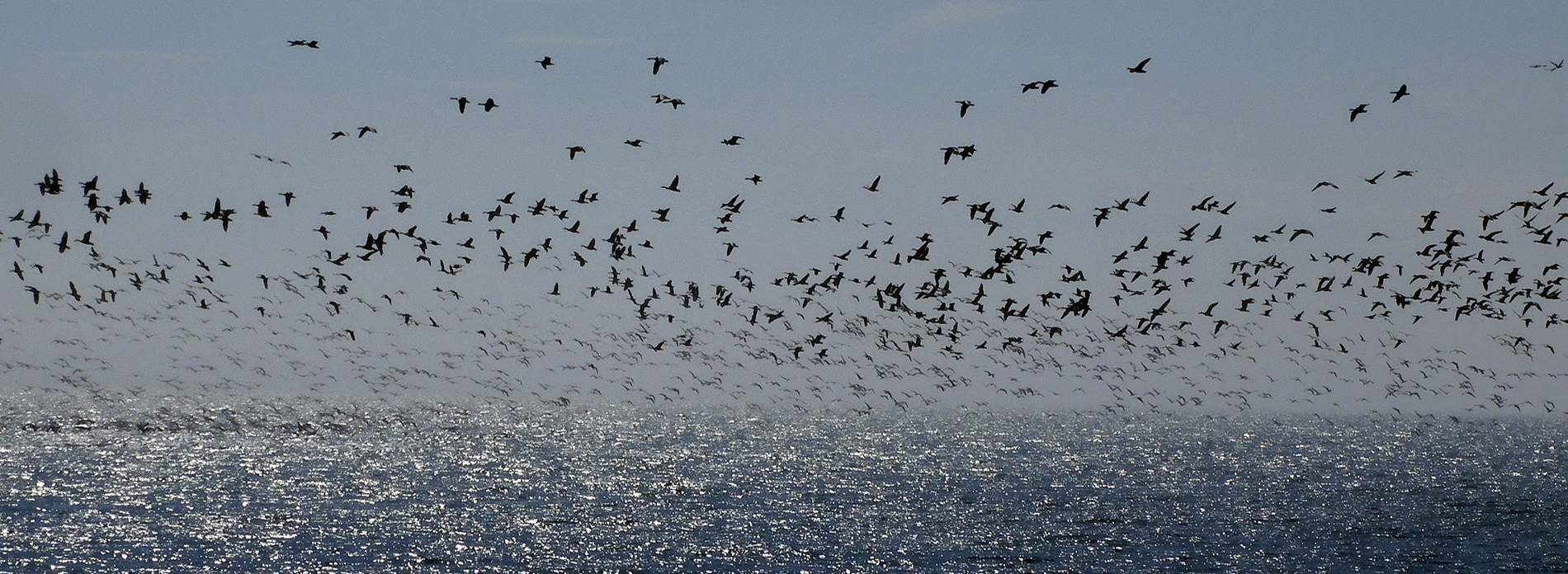
Greylag goose can gather in very large flocks of thousands of individuals.

Greylag geese are gregarious birds and form flocks. This has the advantage for the birds that the vigilance of some individuals in the group allows the rest to feed without having to constantly be alert to the approach of predators. After the eggs hatch, some grouping of families occur, enabling the geese to defend their young by their joint actions, such as mobbing or attacking predators. After driving off a predator, a gander will return to its mate and give a "triumph call", a resonant honk followed by a low-pitched cackle, uttered with neck extended forward parallel with the ground. The mate and even unfledged young reciprocate in kind.

Young greylags stay with their parents as a family group, migrating with them in a larger flock, and only dispersing when the adults drive them away from their newly established breeding territory the following year. At least in Europe, patterns of migration are well understood and follow traditional routes with known staging sites and wintering sites. The young learn these locations from their parents which normally stay together for life. Greylags leave their northern breeding areas relatively late in the autumn, for example completing their departure from Iceland by November, and start their return migration as early as January. Birds that breed in Iceland overwinter in the British Isles; those from Central Europe overwinter as far south as Spain and North Africa; others migrate down to the Balkans, Turkey and Iraq for the winter.

== In human culture ==
Geese are important to multiple culinary traditions. The meat, liver and other organs, fat, skin and blood are used culinarily in various cuisines.

The greylag goose was once revered across Eurasia. It was linked with the goddess of healing, Gula, a forerunner of the Sumerian fertility goddess Ishtar, in the cities of the Tigris-Euphrates delta over 5,000 years ago. In Ancient Egypt, geese symbolised the sun god Ra. In Ancient Greece and Rome, they were associated with the goddess of love, Aphrodite, and goose fat was used as an aphrodisiac. Since they were sacred birds, they were kept on Rome's Capitoline Hill, from where they raised the alarm when the Gauls attacked in 390 BCE.

The goose's role in fertility survives in modern British tradition in the nursery rhyme Goosey Goosey Gander, which preserves its sexual overtones ("And in my lady's chamber"), while "to goose" still has a sexual meaning. The tradition of pulling a wishbone derives from the tradition of eating a roast goose at Michaelmas, where the goose bone was once believed to have the powers of an oracle. For that festival, in Thomas Bewick's time, geese were driven in thousand-strong flocks on foot from farms all over the East of England to London's Cheapside market, covering some 13 or 14 kilometres (8 or 9 mi) per day. Some farmers painted the geese's feet with tar and sand to protect them from road wear as they walked.

Greylag geese were domesticated by at least 1360 BCE, when images of domesticated birds resembling the eastern subspecies Anser anser rubirostris (which like many modern farmyard geese, but unlike western greylags, have a pink beak) were painted in Ancient Egypt. Goose feathers were used as quill pens, the best being the primary feathers of the left-wing, whose "curvature bent away from the eyes of right-handed writers". The feathers also served to fletch arrows. In ethology, the greylag goose was the subject of Konrad Lorenz's pioneering studies of imprinting behaviour.

== Gallery ==
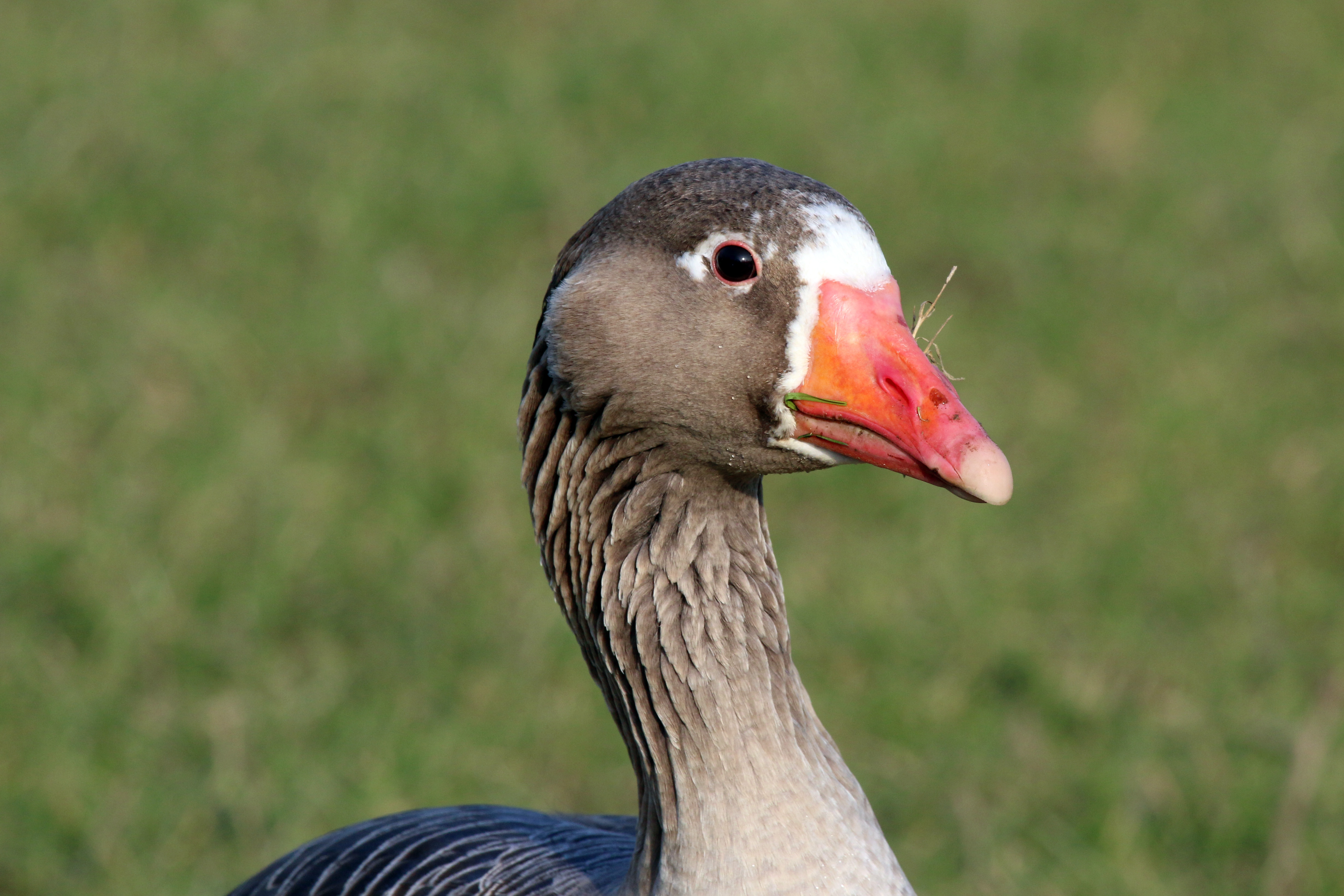
Variant with white "front"

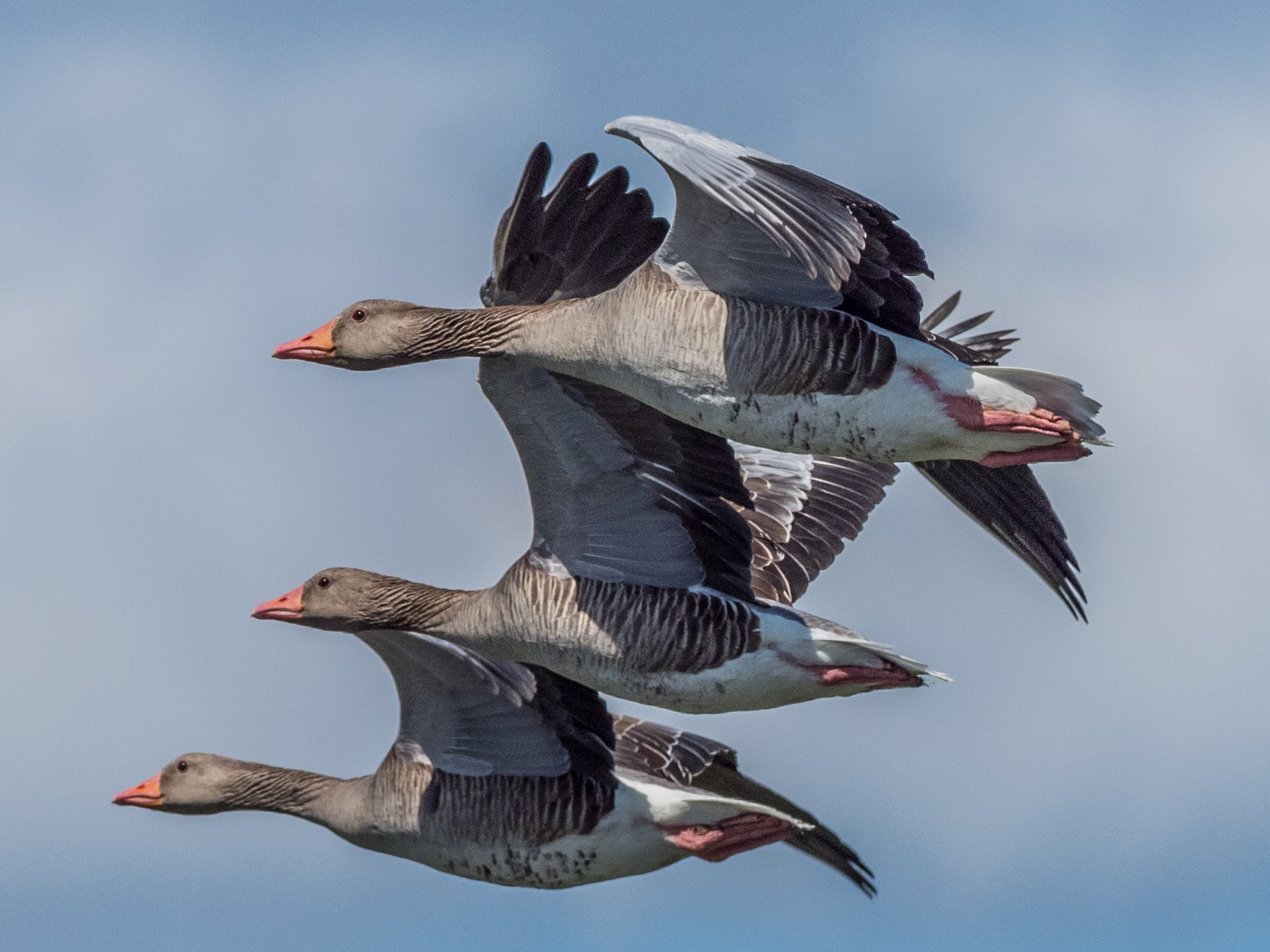
In flight

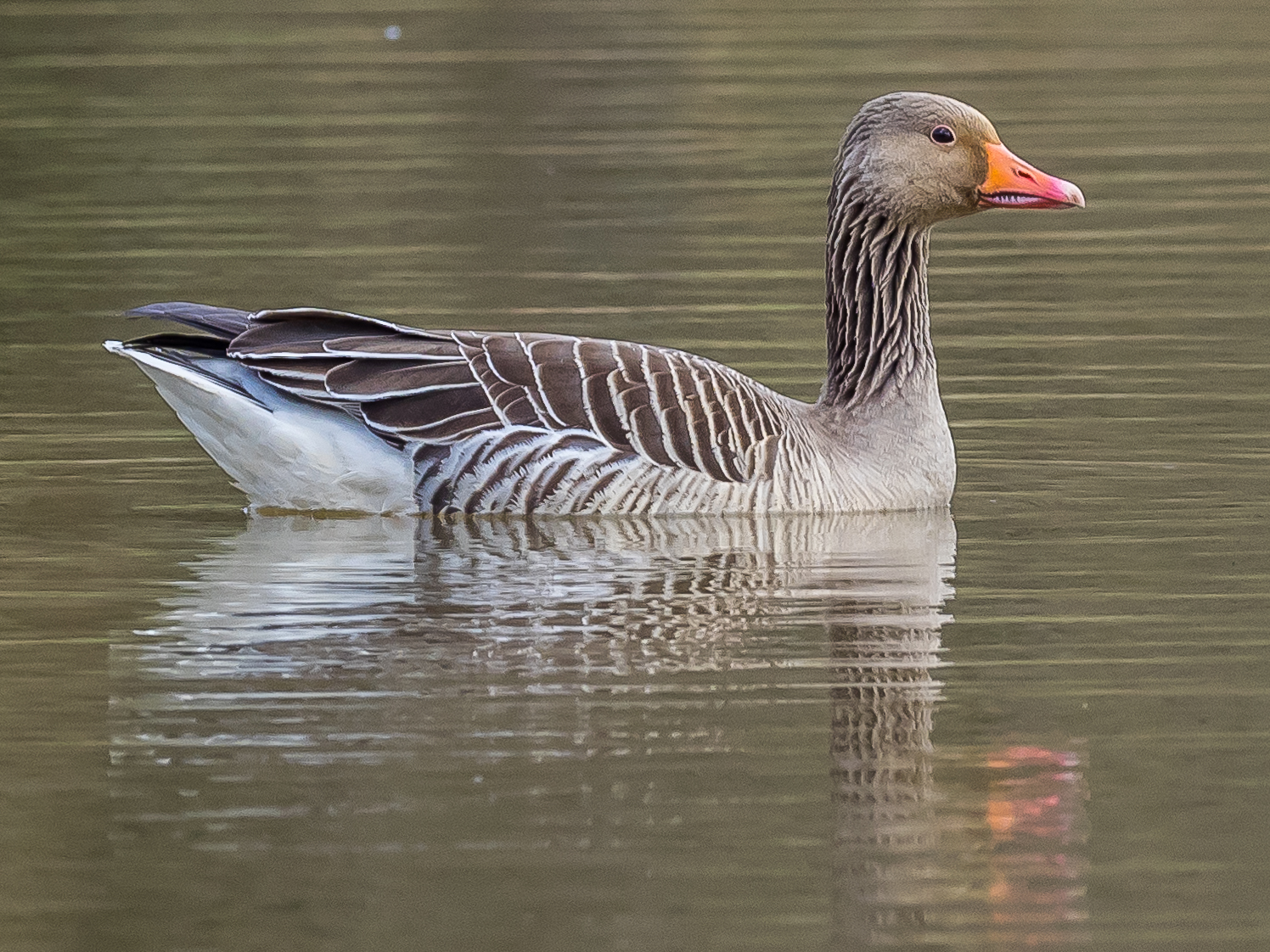
Swimming

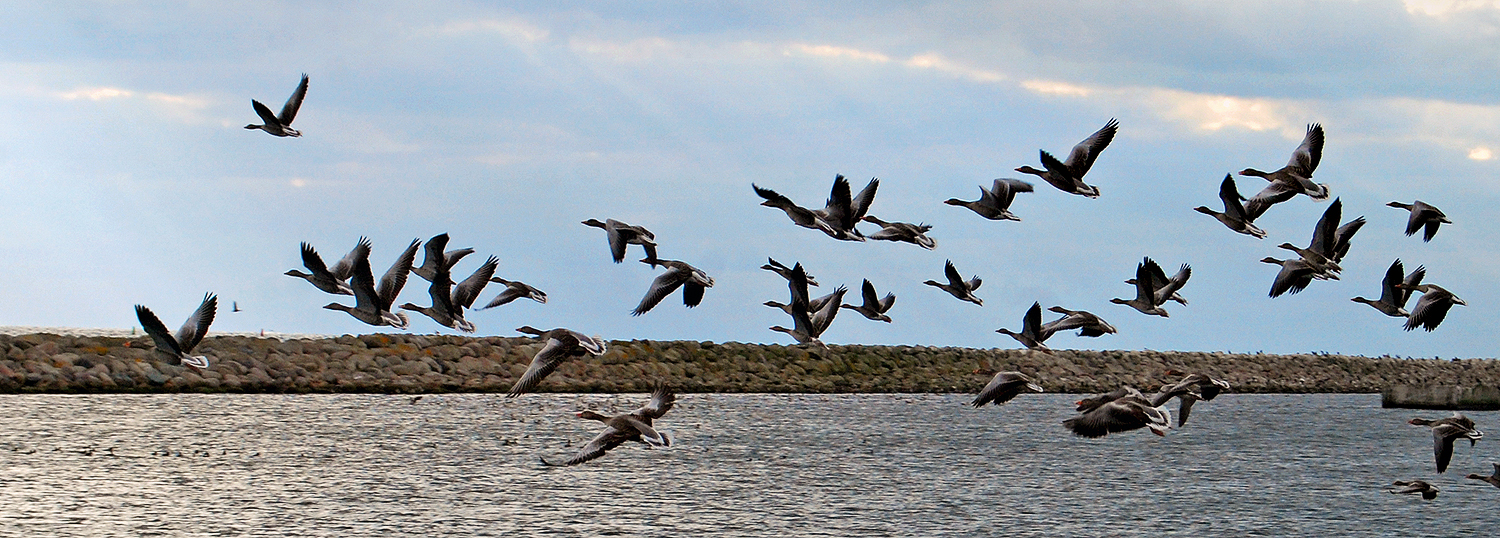
Flock taking off over water

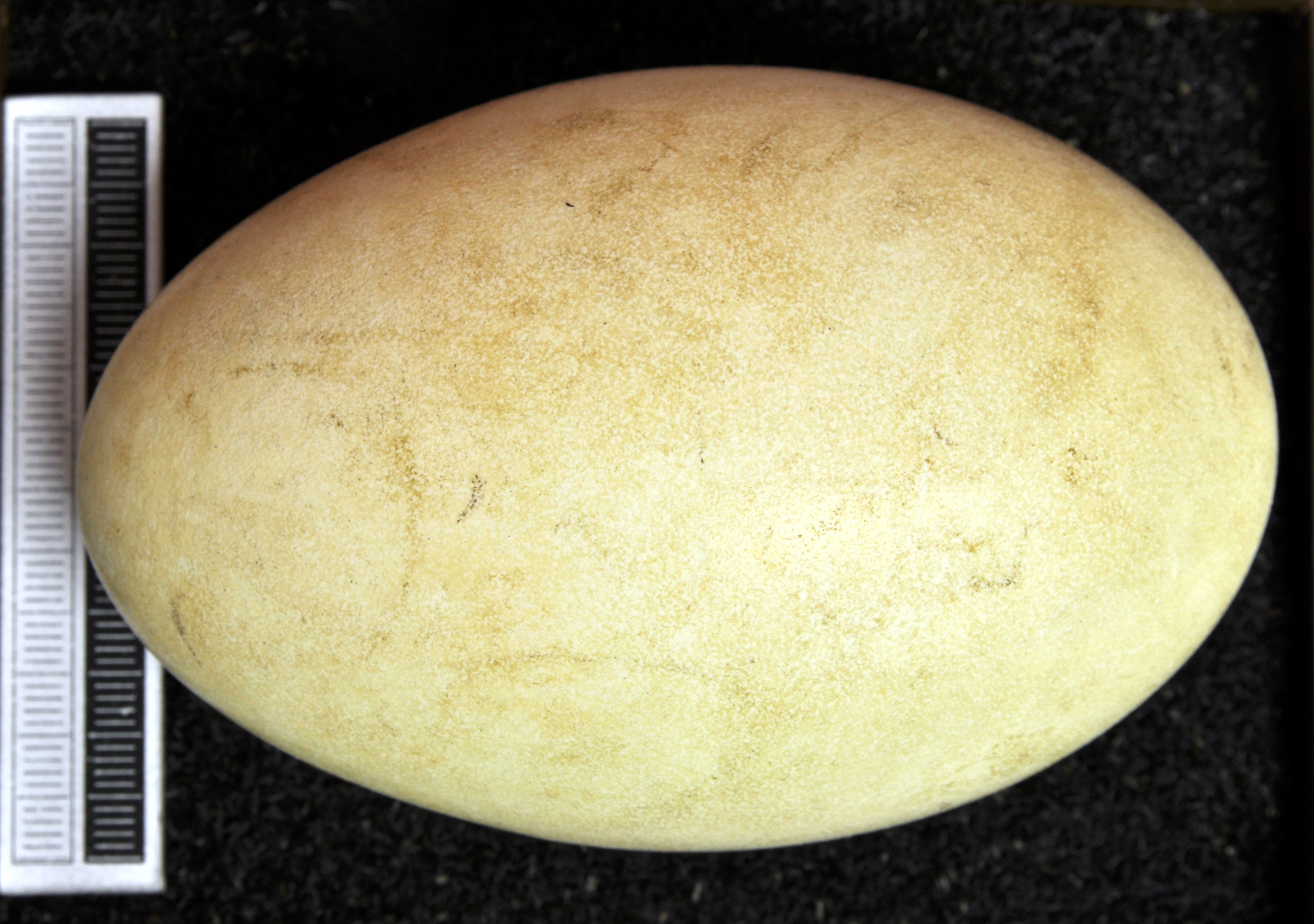
Egg, Collection Museum Wiesbaden

On Texel, Netherlands

In Ystad

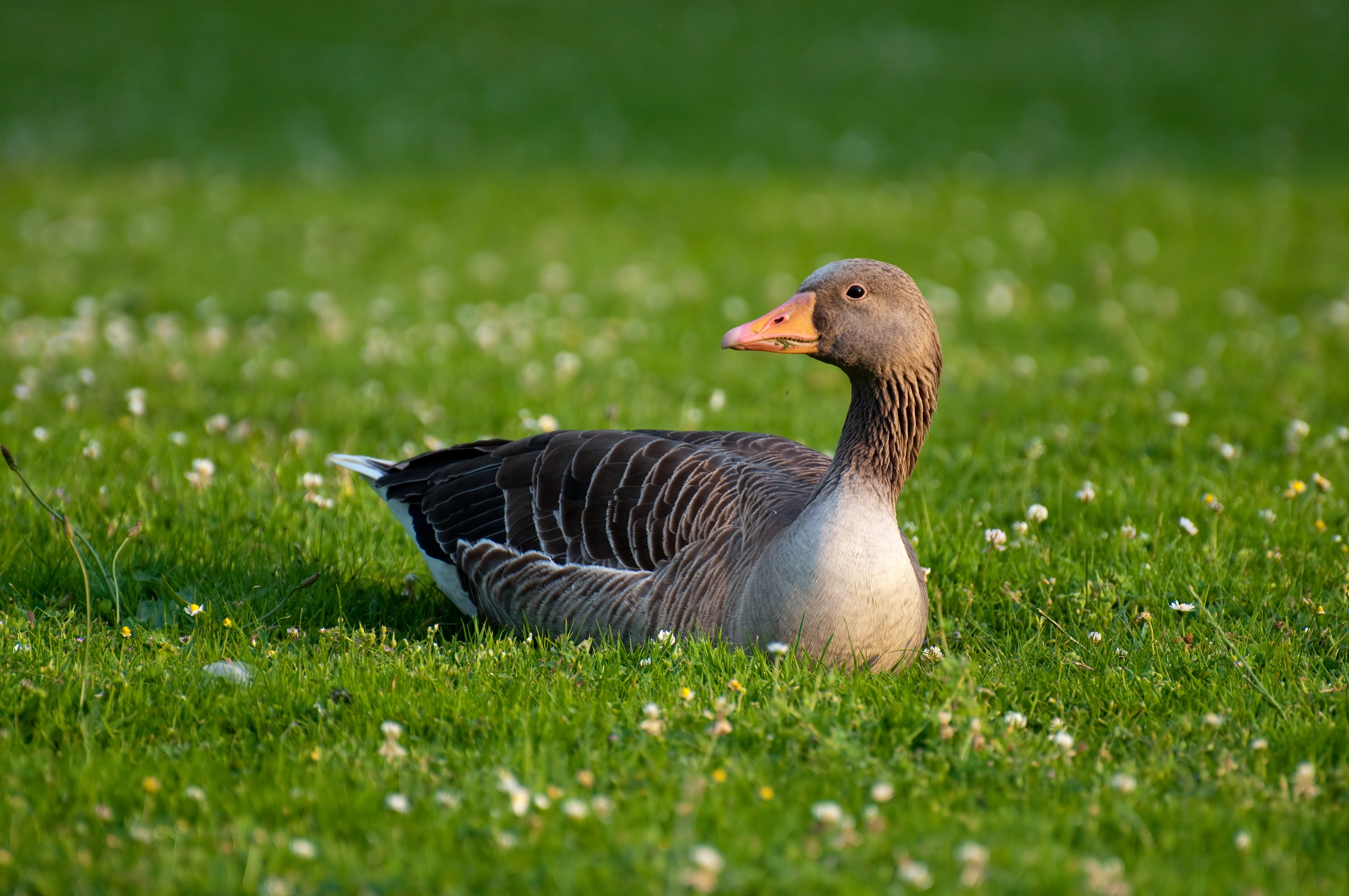
Adult, Poland

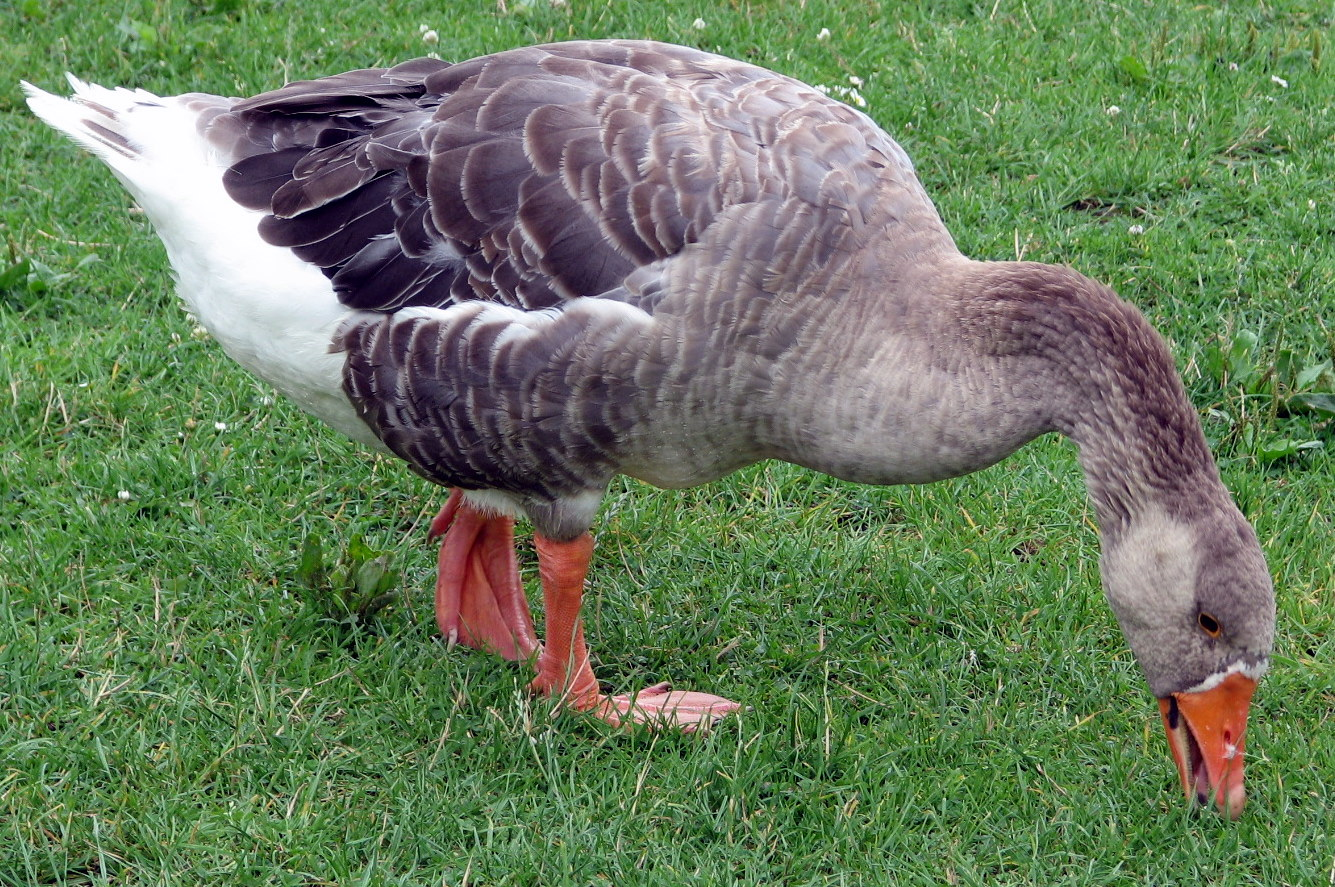
An interspecific hybrid between a wild greylag goose and a domesticated swan goose, as evidenced by its thick neck and bulky head, both of which display vestigial patterning similar to that of the swan goose

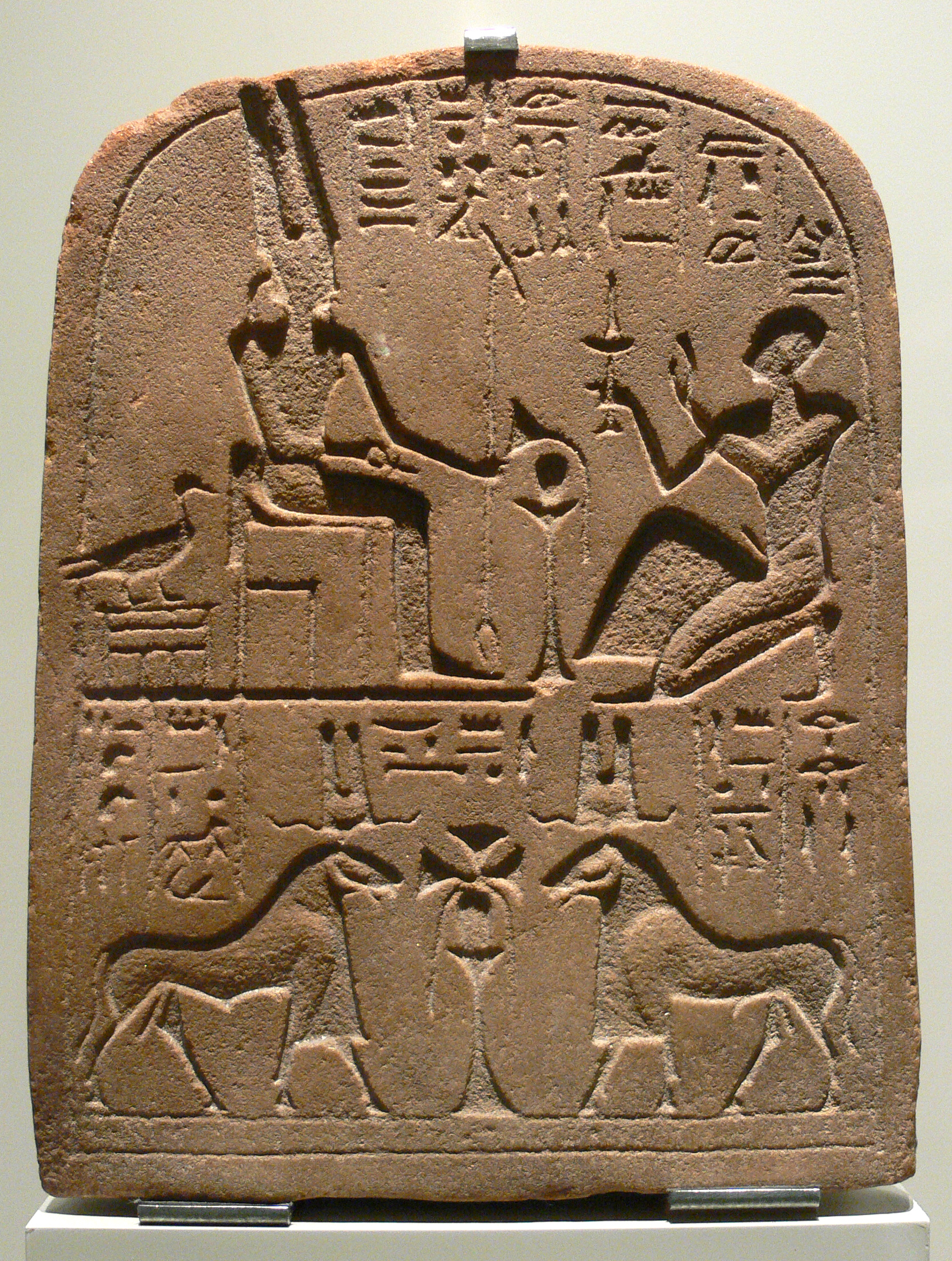
Ancient Egyptian stele showing Amun-Ra as goose, man, and ram. 25th dynasty, c. 700 BCE.

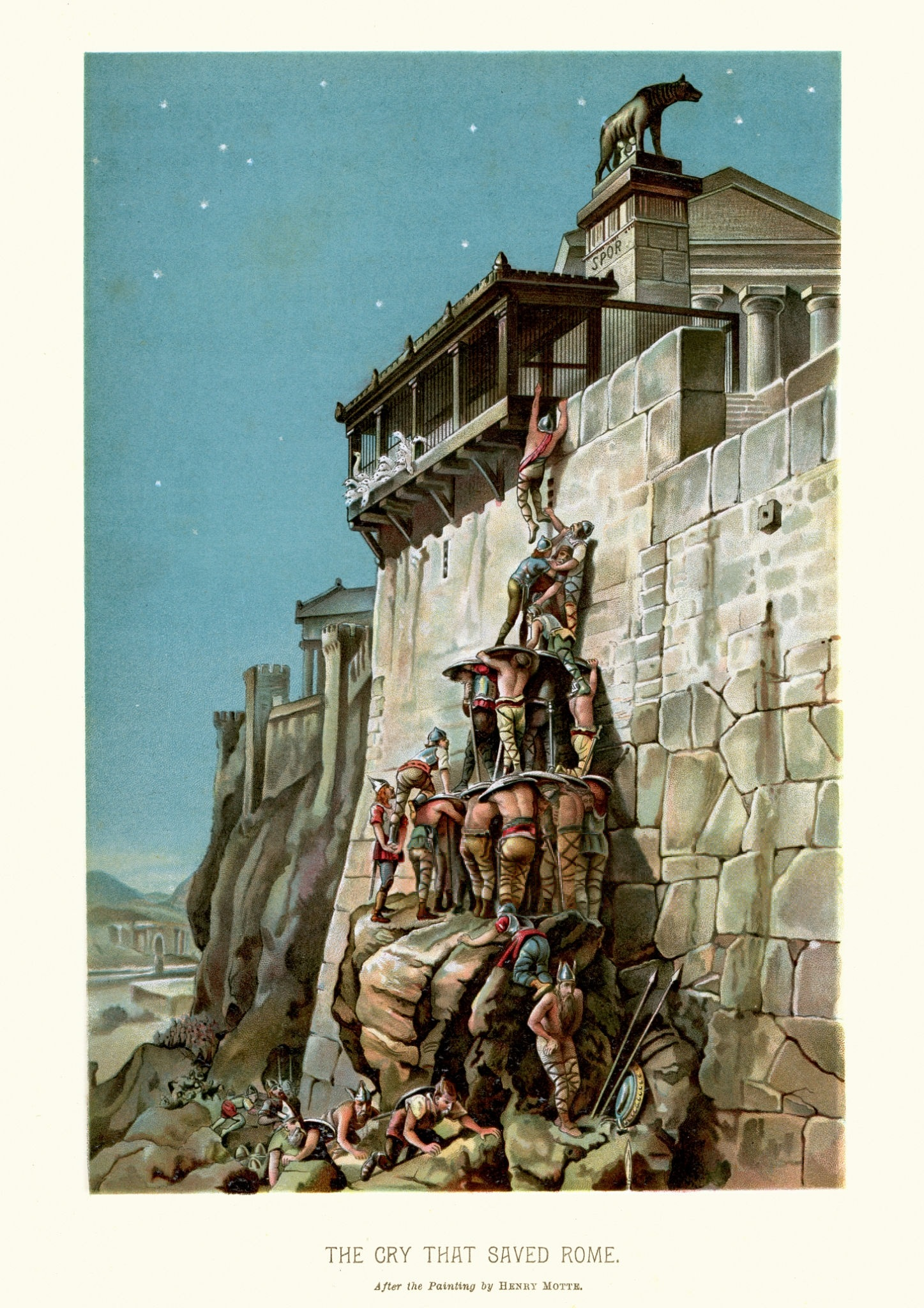
Juno's sacred geese warn the Romans while the Gauls approach the Capitoline Hill in 390 BCE. Lithograph after Henri-Paul Motte (1883)
