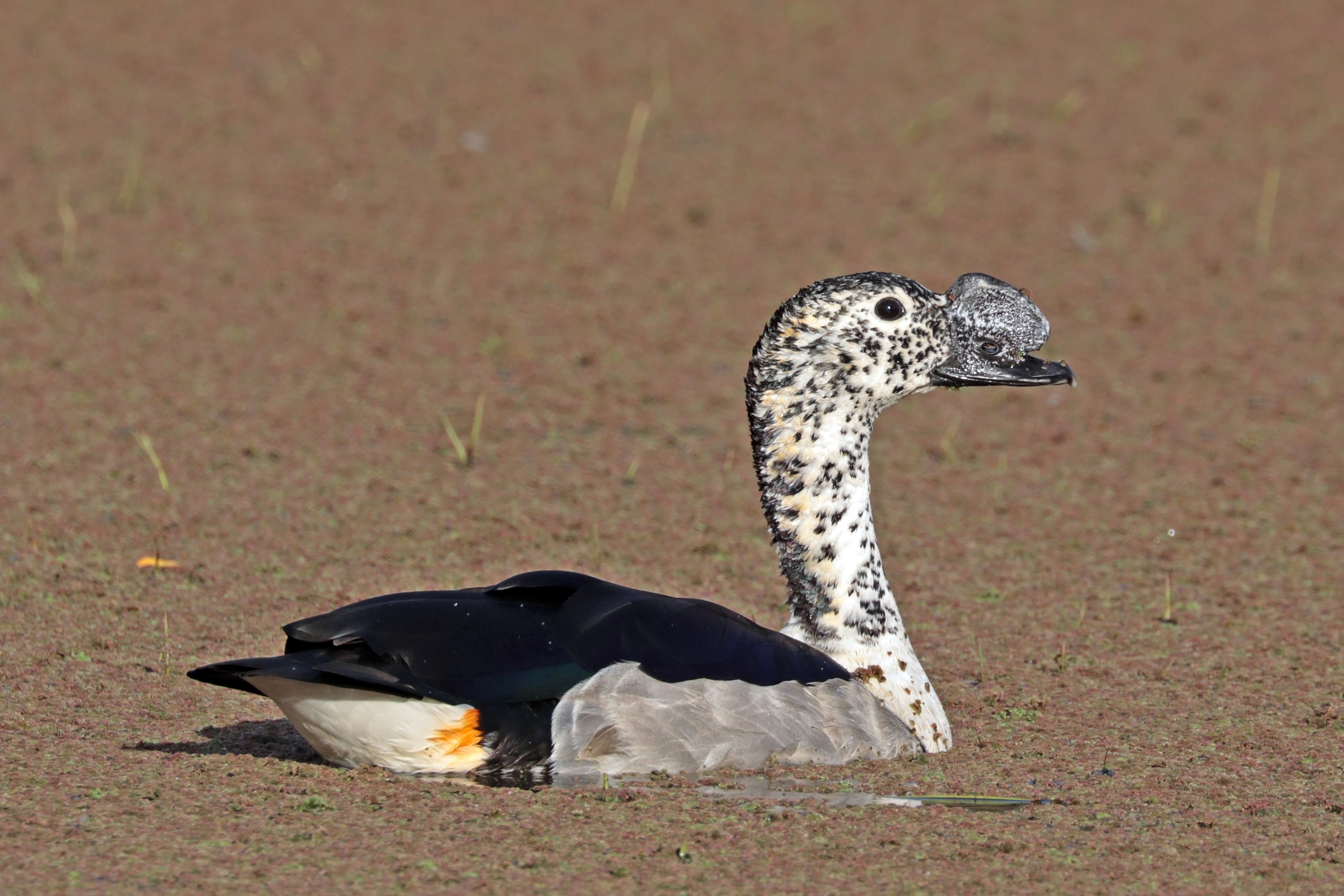
- Male, Lake Ziway, Ethiopia
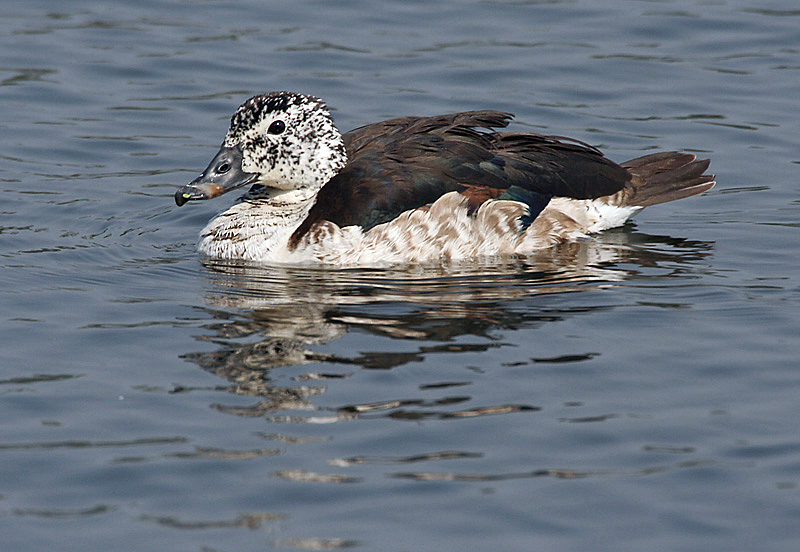
- Female, India

Conservation status
- Least Concern (IUCN 3.1)
- CITES Appendix II

Scientific classification
- Kingdom: Animalia
- Phylum: Chordata
- Class: Aves
- Order: Anseriformes
- Family: Anatidae
- Genus: Sarkidiornis
- Species: S. melanotos

Binomial name
- Sarkidiornis melanotos (Pennant, 1769)
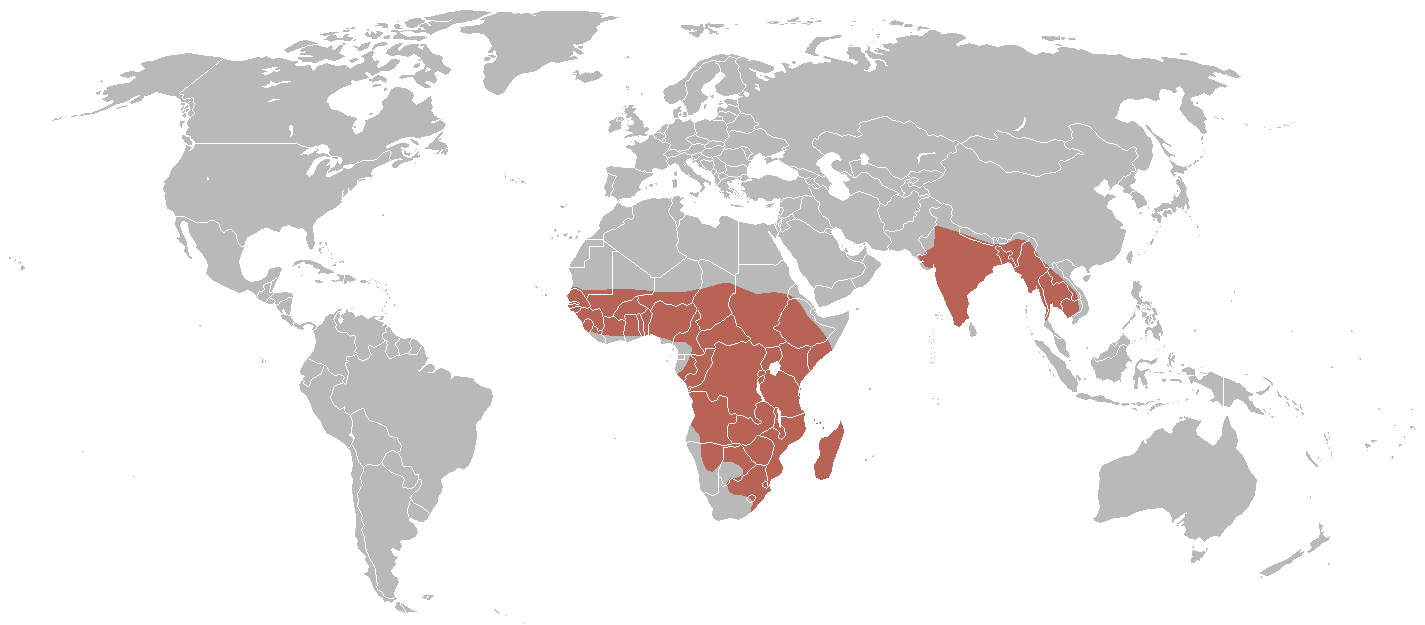
- Global range

Synonyms
- Anser melanotos Pennant, 1769

= Knob-billed duck =

Species of bird

The knob-billed duck (Sarkidiornis melanotos) or African comb duck is a type of duck found along the tropical/sub-tropical wetlands and waterways of Sub-Saharan Africa and the island of Madagascar, as well as most of South Asia and mainland Indochina.

Most taxonomic authorities classify the knob-billed duck and the comb duck separately. A misidentified species of extinct Mauritian comb duck was initially described from unrecognised remains of the Mauritius sheldgoose (Alopochen mauritiana); this was realised as early as 1897, but the printed case of mistaken identity can still, occasionally, be found in modern-day sources.

== Taxonomy and systematics ==
Uncertainty surrounds the correct systematic placement of this species. Initially, it was placed in the dabbling duck subfamily Anatinae. Later, it was assigned to the "perching ducks", a paraphyletic assemblage of waterfowl most of which are intermediate between dabbling ducks and shelducks. As the "perching ducks" were split up, the knob-billed duck was moved to the Tadorninae or shelduck subfamily.

Analysis of mtDNA sequences of the cytochrome b and NADH dehydrogenase subunit 2 genes, however, suggests that it is a quite basal member of the Anatidae, vindicating the earliest placement. But its closest living relatives cannot be resolved to satisfaction without further study.

== Description ==
This common species is unmistakable. It is one of the largest species of duck. Length can range from 56 to 76 cm (22 to 30 in), wingspan ranges from 116 to 145 cm (46 to 57 in) and weight from 1.03 to 2.9 kg (2.3 to 6.4 lb). Adults have a white head freckled with dark spots, and a pure white neck and underparts. The upperparts are glossy blue-black upperparts, with bluish and greenish iridescence especially prominent on the secondaries (lower arm feathers). The male is much larger than the female, and has a large black knob on the bill. Young birds are dull buff below and on the face and neck, with dull brown upperparts, top of the head and eyestripe. Knob-billed ducks are generally larger in size when compared to comb ducks, and flanks are usually lighter (light grey, in females sometimes whitish).

Immature knob-billed ducks look like a large greyish female of the cotton pygmy goose (Nettapus coromandelicus) and may be difficult to tell apart if no other birds are around to compare size and hue. However, knob-billed ducks in immature plumage are rarely seen without adults nearby and thus they are usually easily identified too.

The knob-billed duck is silent except for a low croak when flushed.

== Ecology ==
It breeds in still freshwater swamps and lakes in the tropics. It is largely resident, apart from dispersion in the wet season.

This duck feeds on vegetation by grazing or dabbling and to a lesser extent on small fish, invertebrates, and seeds. It can become a problem to rice farmers. Knob-billed ducks often perch in trees. They are typically seen in flocks, small in the wet season, up to 100 in the dry season. Sometimes they separate according to sex.

The knob-billed duck is declining in numbers locally, but due to its wide range it is not considered globally threatened by the IUCN. It is one of the species to which the Agreement on the Conservation of African-Eurasian Migratory Waterbirds applies.

=== Reproduction ===
African birds breed during and after the rainy season and may not breed if the rain is scanty. Knob-billed ducks nest mainly in tree holes, also in tall grass.

Males may have two mates at once or up to five in succession. They defend the females and young but not the nest sites.

Females lay 7 to 15 yellowish-white eggs.

== Gallery ==
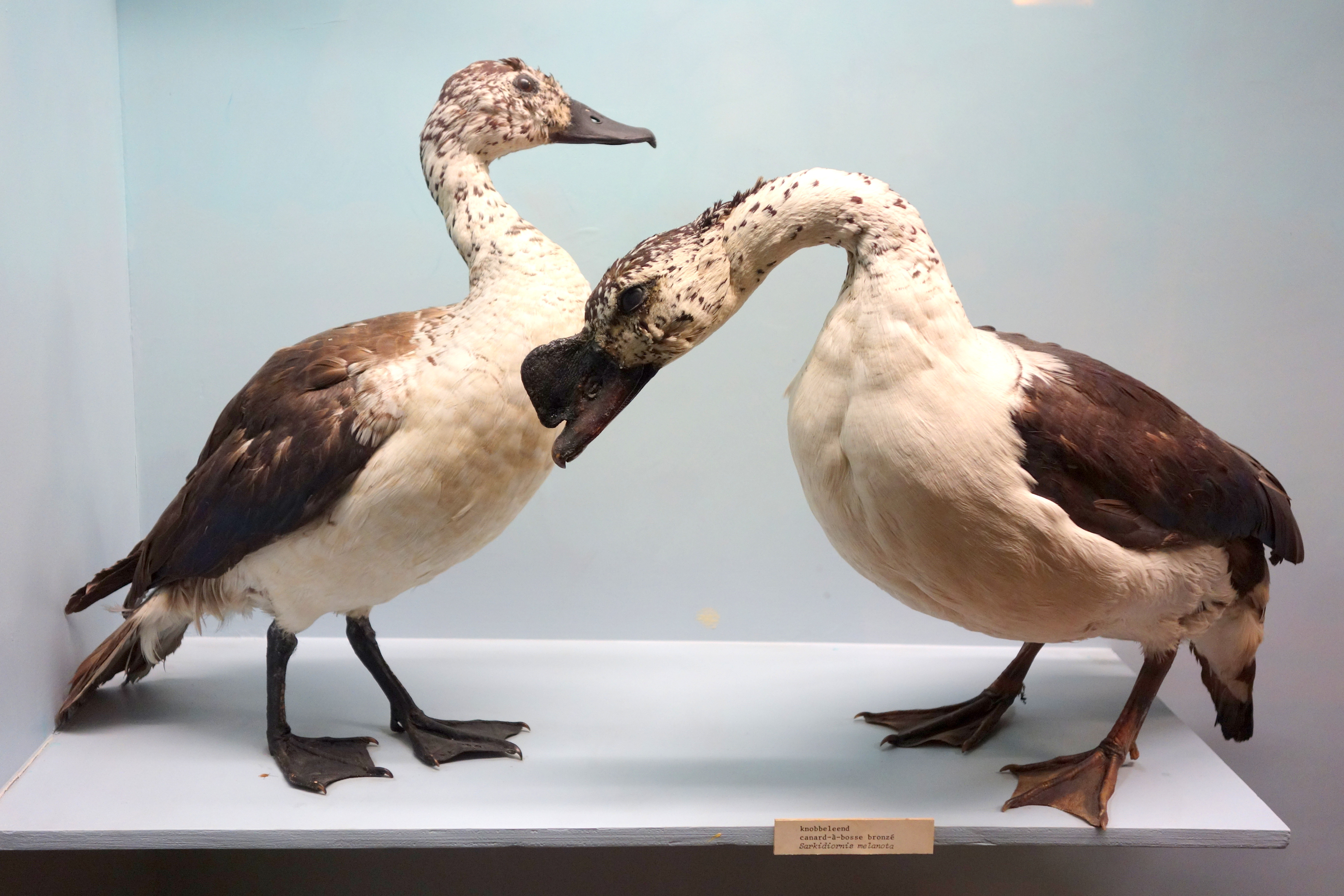
Specimens from the Royal Museum for Central Africa (female, male)

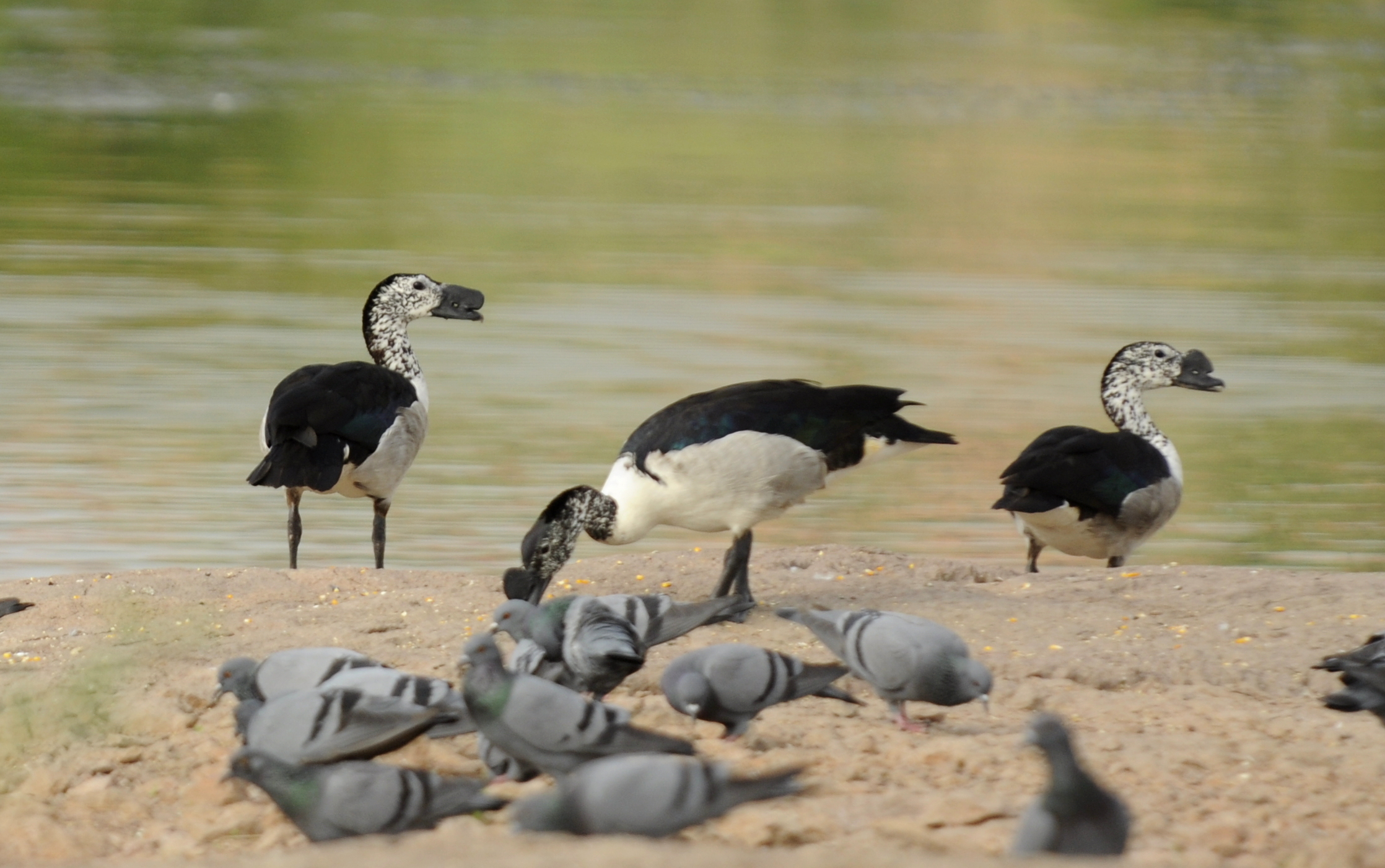
knob-billed duck at edge of lake near Jodhpur, Rajasthan, India, feeding alongside feral pigeons.

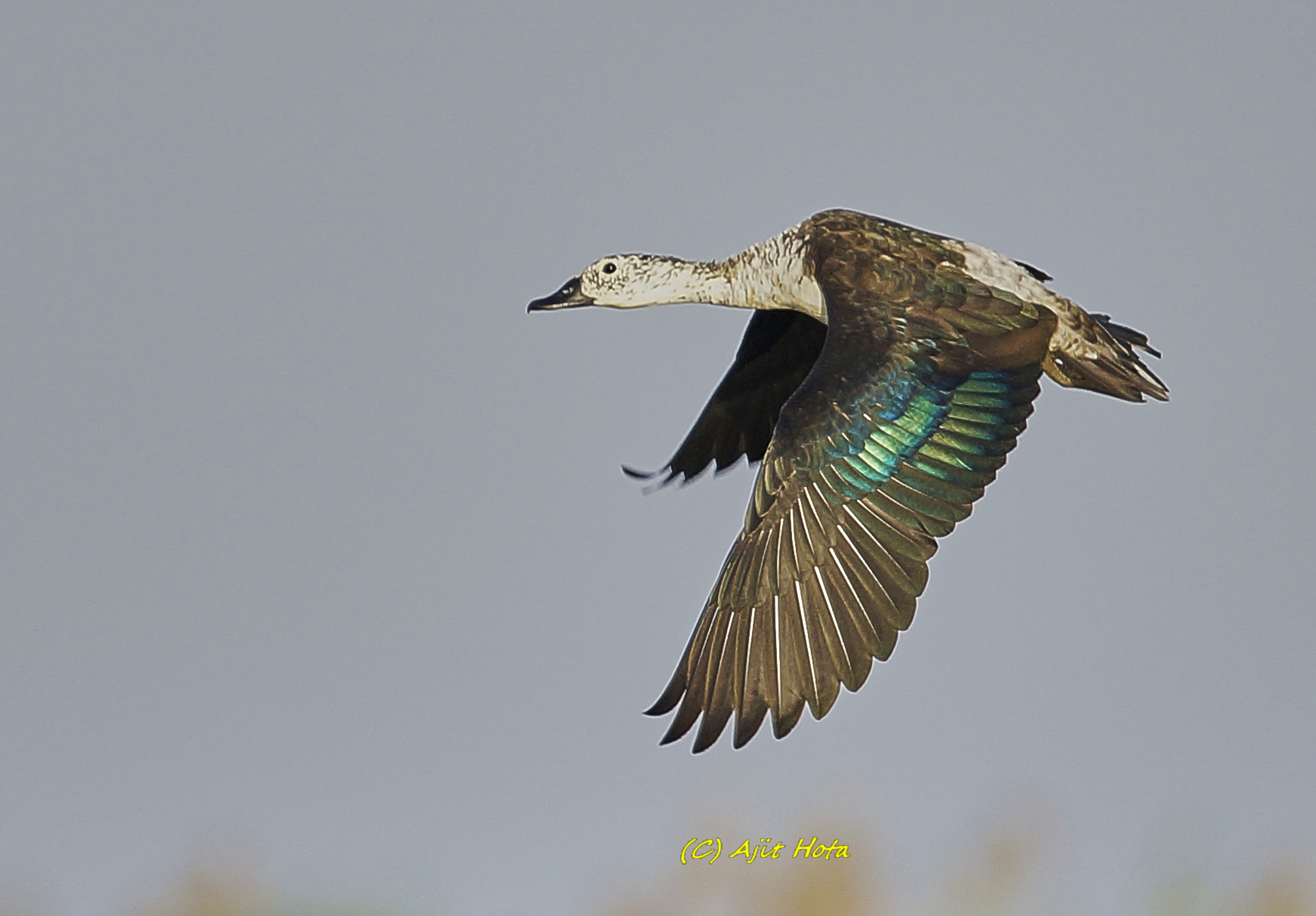
Flying knob-billed duck / comb duck at Chilika Lake, Odisha, India

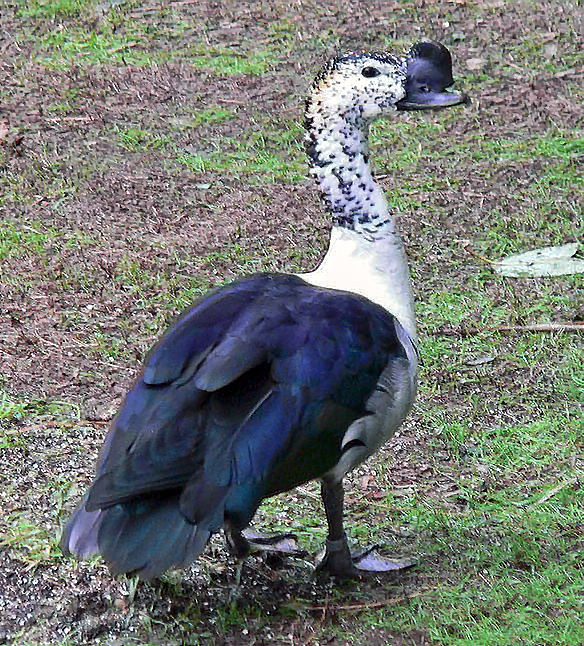
Arampannai, Tamilnadu, India

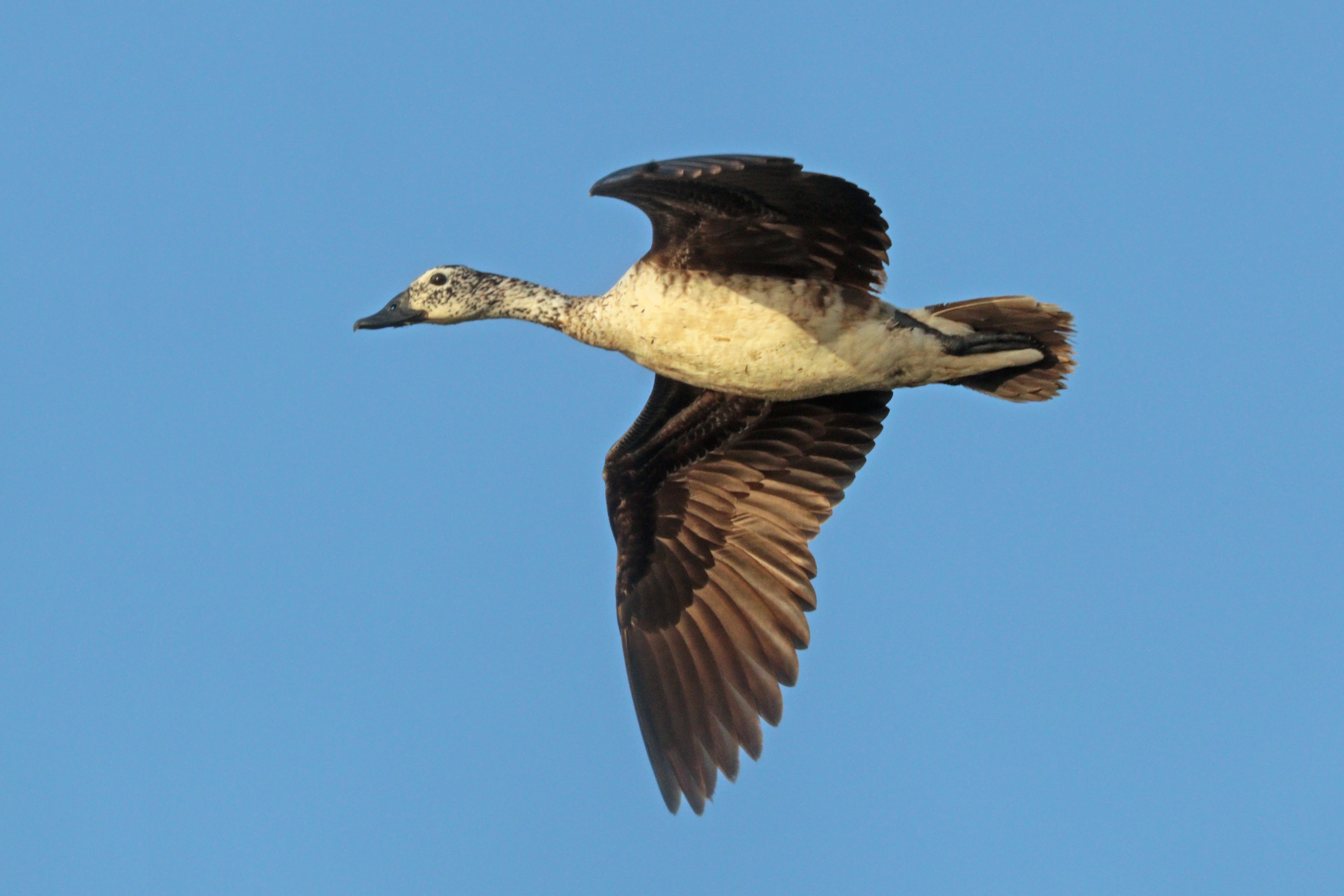
female, Jojawar, India

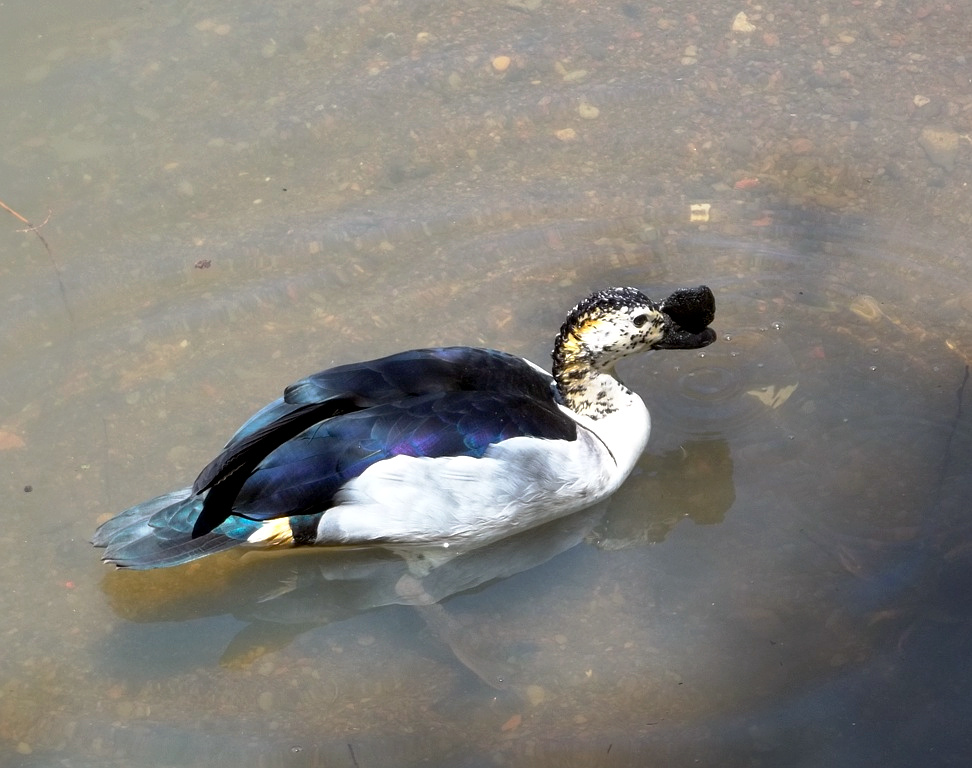
Male knob-billed duck at Austin Roberts Bird Sanctuary in Pretoria, South Africa

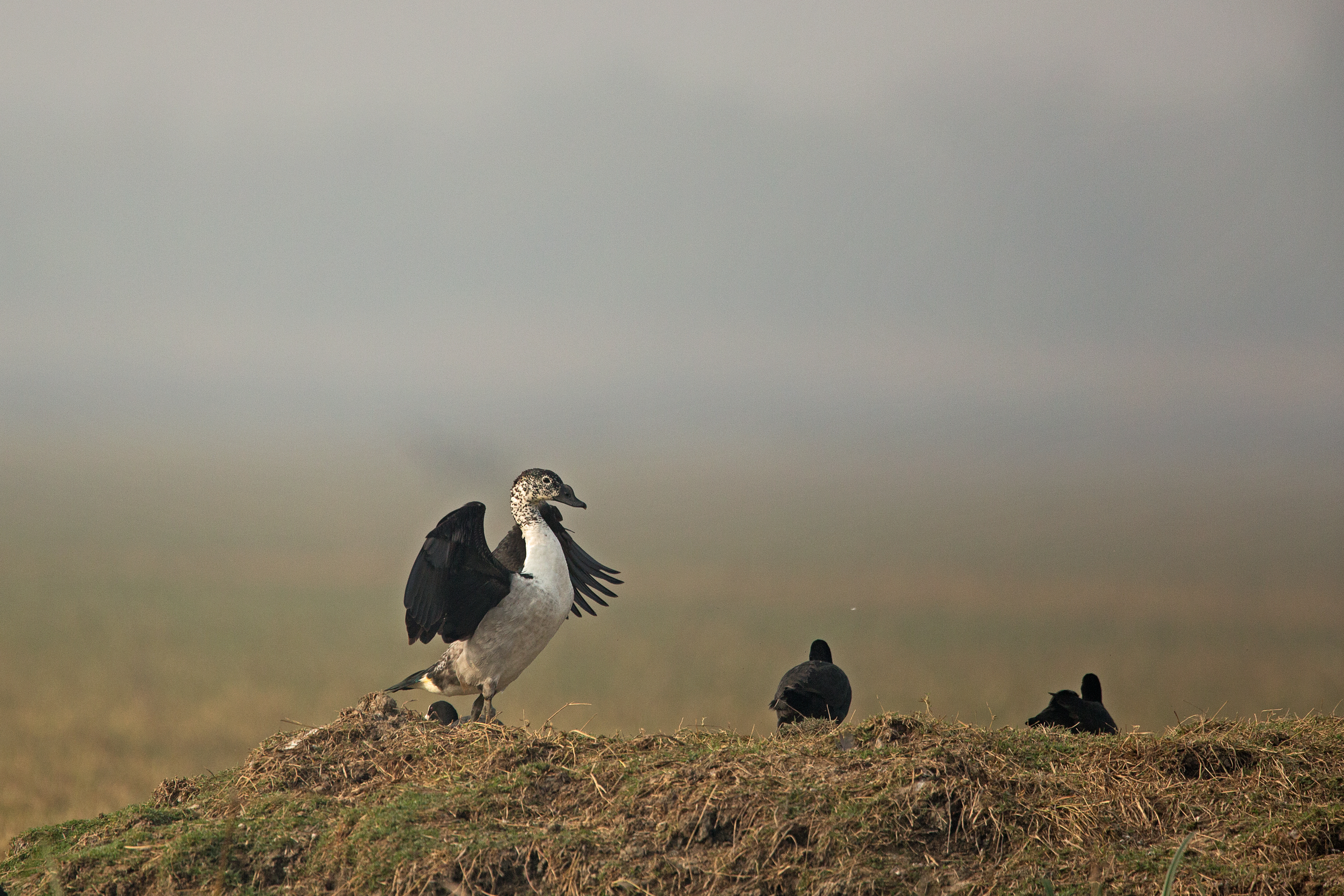
Knob-billed Duck (Sarkidiornis melanotos) alongside Eurasian Coot ((Fulica atra) in Keoladeo National Park, Rajasthan, India

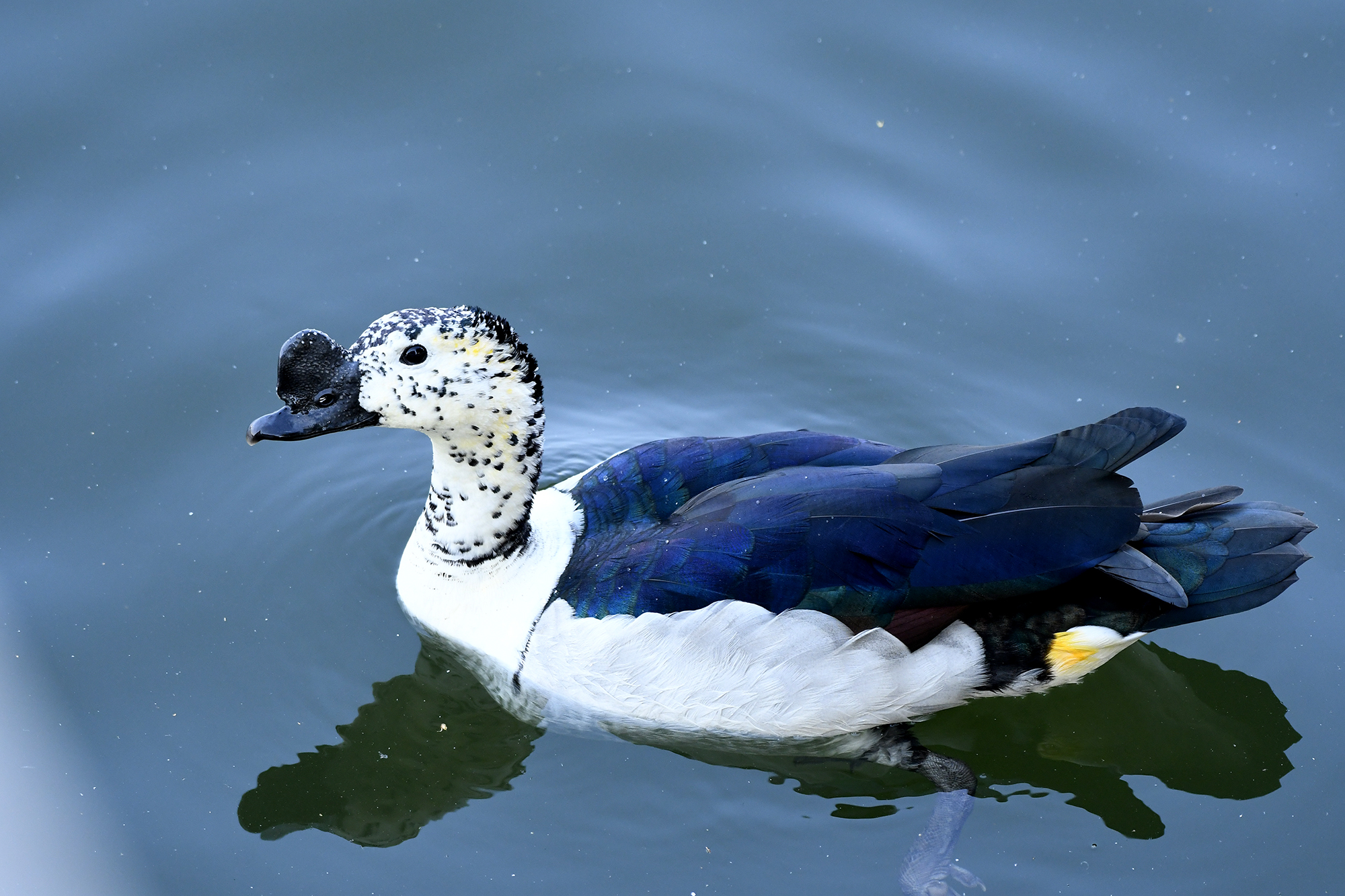
Male at Jamnagar, India

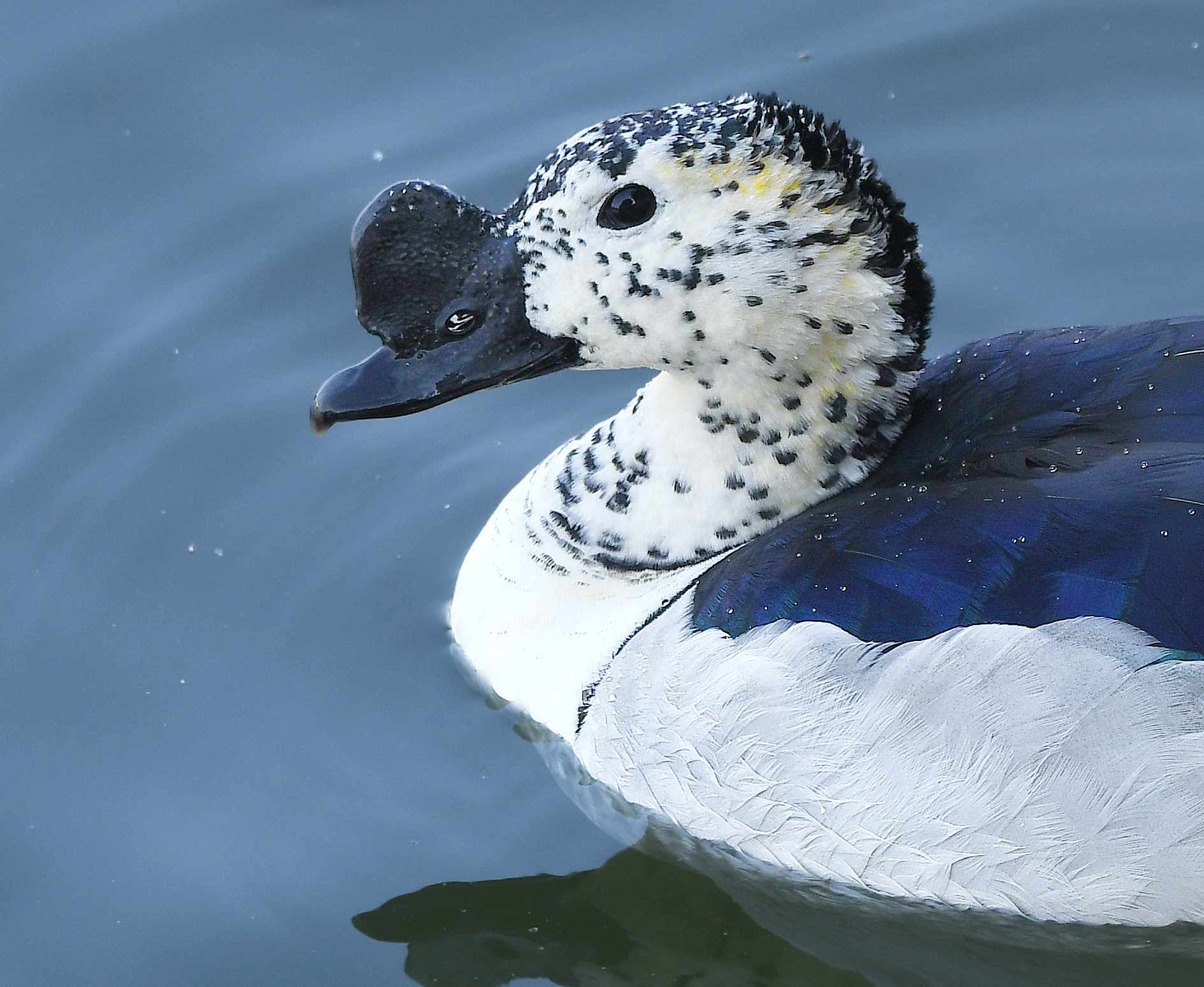
Close-up Male
