= Keoladeo National Park =

Bird sanctuary in Rajasthan, India

Keoladeo Ghana National Park
- IUCN category II (national park)
- Location within Rajasthan Location within India
- Interactive map of Keoladeo Ghana National Park
- Location: Bharatpur, Rajasthan, India
- Nearest city: Bharatpur, Rajasthan
- Coordinates: 27.166667°N 77.516667°E
- Area: 2,873 hectares (7,100 acres; 11.1 sq mi; 28.7 km^{2})
- Established: 10 March 1982
- Visitors: 147,000 (in 2017)
- Governing body: Rajasthan Tourism Development Corporation

UNESCO World Heritage Site
- Official name: Keoladeo National Park
- Criteria: Natural: (x)
- Reference: 340
- Inscription: 1985 (9th Session)

Ramsar Wetland
- Designated: 1 October 1981
- Reference no.: 230

Keoladeo National Park, or Keoladeo Ghana National Park, is a national park in Rajasthan, India. The national park hosts thousands of native, resident and migratory birds, especially during the winter season, when many different species fly to the Indian subcontinent to escape harsh winters further north in Eurasia. At least 400 avian species have been noted or observed in the national park.

The area was developed into a duck shooting reserve in 1899 by the administrator of the Bharatpur State. Through the efforts of ornithologist Salim Ali, it became the Bharatpur Bird Sanctuary in 1956, was declared a protected sanctuary in 1971 and established as the Keoladeo National Park on 10 March 1982. Due to its exceptional avian biodiversity, it has also been declared a UNESCO World Heritage Site (1985).

Keoladeo Ghana National Park also features a human-made regulated wetland, providing a needed source of hydration for animals in this drier region of the subcontinent. The reserve also protects Bharatpur settlements from flash floods and provides ample pastures for the locals' cattle and livestock. In the past, the region was primarily used as a waterfowl hunting ground. The 29 km^{2} (11 sq mi) reserve is locally known as Ghana, a natural mosaic of dry grasslands, woodlands, swamps and seasonal wetlands located just on the eastern edge of terrain that eventually becomes arid desert.

Given its rather centralised location, where the "desert-meets-the-tropics", Keoladeo Ghana is bursting with biodiversity. Beyond the hundreds of bird species, at least 20 fish, 70 reptile and amphibian, and 50 mammalian species inhabit the area, and over 60 unique species of Lepidopterans have been seen here, in addition to the more than 1,000 invertebrate species. Nearly 400 plant species have been documented in the park.

== History ==
The national park was established on 10 March 1982. Previously the private duck shooting preserve of the Maharaja of Bharatpur since the 1850s, the area was designated as a bird sanctuary on 13 March 1976 and a Ramsar site under the Ramsar Convention in October 1981.

Keoladeo National Park was made a World Heritage Site in 1985, under criterion iv. The justification provided was that the park is a "...wetland of international importance for migratory waterfowl. It is the wintering ground for the rare Siberian crane and habitat for large numbers of resident nesting birds". When the criteria were updated in 2005, the park fell under Criteria (x) which states that to be conferred the status of World Heritage, the site should "contain the most important and significant natural habitats for in-site conservation of biological diversity, including those containing threatened species of outstanding universal value from the point of view of science or conservation".

== Geography ==
Keoladeo National Park is 2 km (1.2 mi) south-east of Bharatpur and 55 km (34 mi) west of Agra. It is spread over approx 29 km^{2} (11 sq mi). One third of the Keoladeo National Park is wetland with mounds, dykes, and open water with or without submerged or emergent plants. The uplands have grasslands with tall grass species together with scattered trees and shrubs present in varying density. A similar habitat with short grasses, such as Cynodon dactylon and Dichanthium annulatum also exists. Woodlands with thickets of huge Kadam trees Neolamarckia cadamba are distributed in scattered pockets. The park's flora consists of 379 species of flowering plants of which 96 are wetland species. The wetland is a part of the Indo-Gangetic Great Plains.

Water remains only in some depressions. This alternate wetting and drying helps to maintain the ecology of the freshwater swamp, ideal for water-fowl and resident water birds. Arrangement to pump water from deep tube wells to fill small depressions to save seeds, spores and other aquatic life also exist. They are also helpful in extreme years of drought.

== Climate ==
During 1988, the mean maximum temperature ranged from 20.9 °C (69.6 °F) in January to 47.8 °C (118.0 °F) in May, while the mean temperature varied from 6.8 °C (44.2 °F) in December to 26.5 °C (79.7 °F) in June. The diurnal temperature variation ranged from 5 °C (41 °F) in January to 50 °C (122 °F) in May. Mean relatively humidity varied from 62% in March to 83.3% in December. The mean annual precipitation is 662 mm (26.1 in), with rain falling on an average of 36 days per year. In 1988, only 395 mm (15.6 in) of rain fell during 32 days.

== Ecology ==
=== Flora ===
Piloo (Salvadora oleoides and Salvadora persica) are also present in the park, and happen to be virtually the only woody plants found thriving in areas of saline soil. Aquatic vegetation is also rich and provides a valuable food source for amphibious organisms. In 2007 and 2008, several active attempts were made to eradicate the non-native mesquite Prosopis juliflora and some invasive members of the asteraceous genus Cineraria.

=== Fauna ===
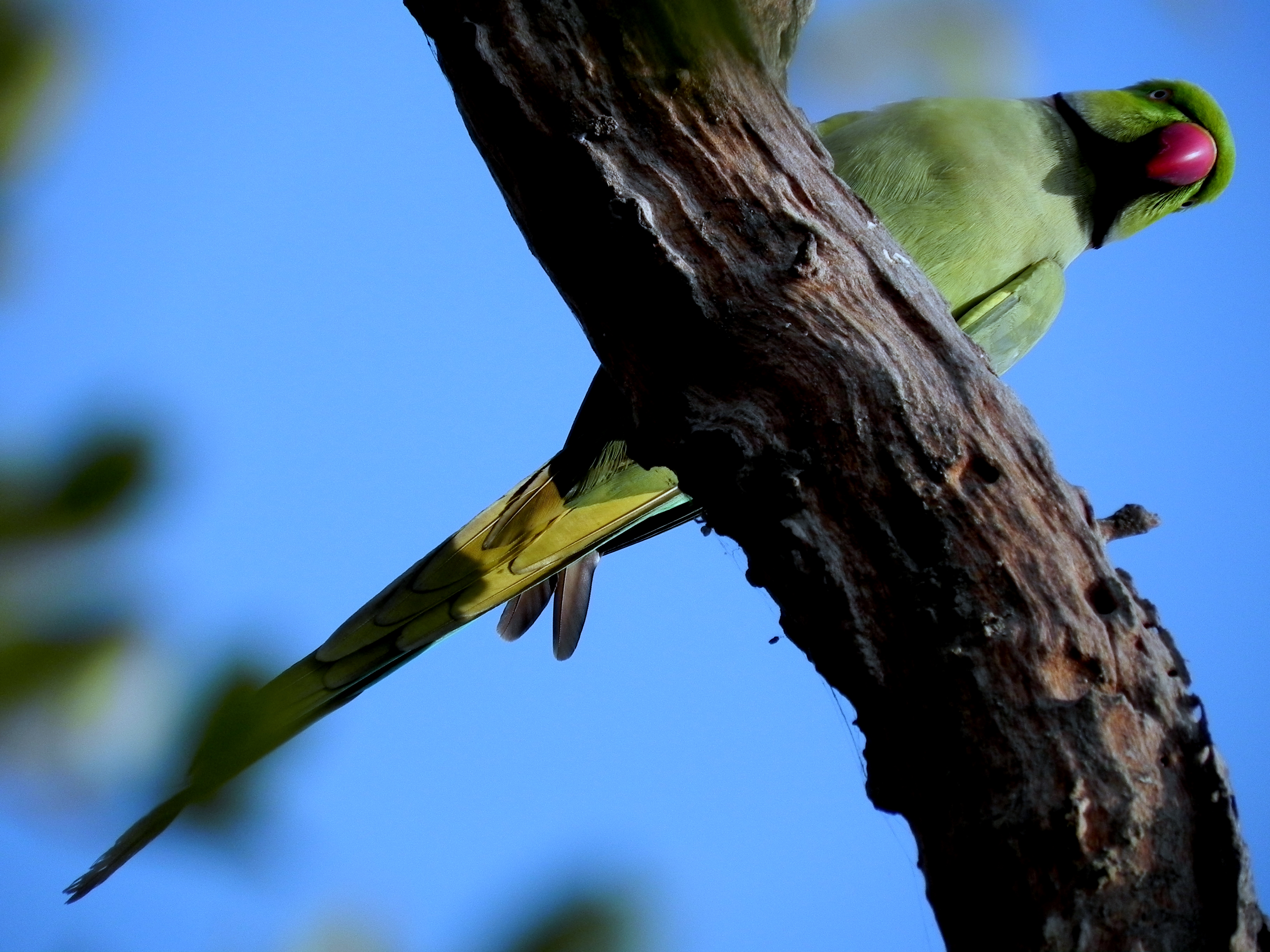
Common parakeet in Keoladeo National Park

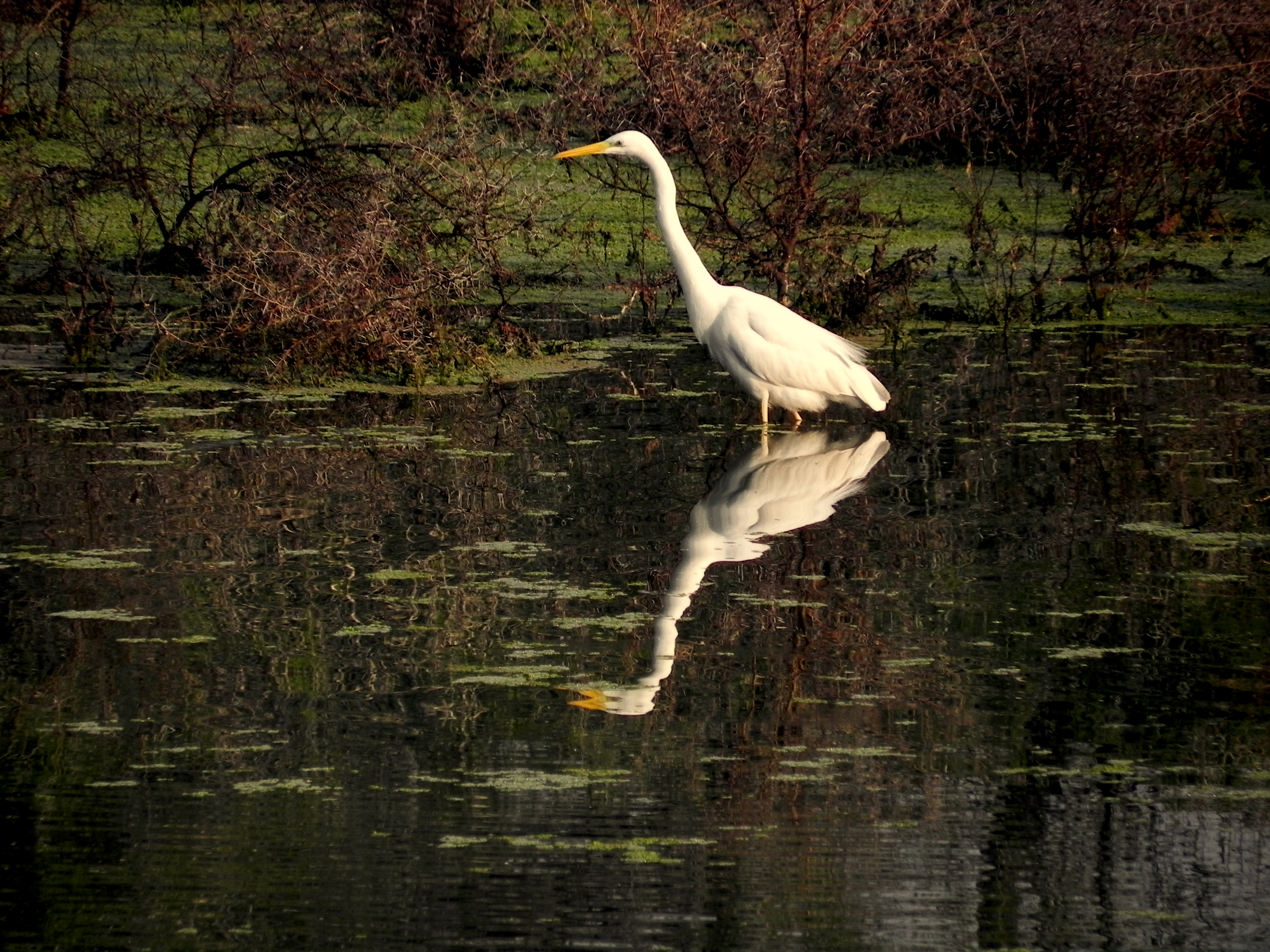
Great egret in Keoladeo Ghana National Park

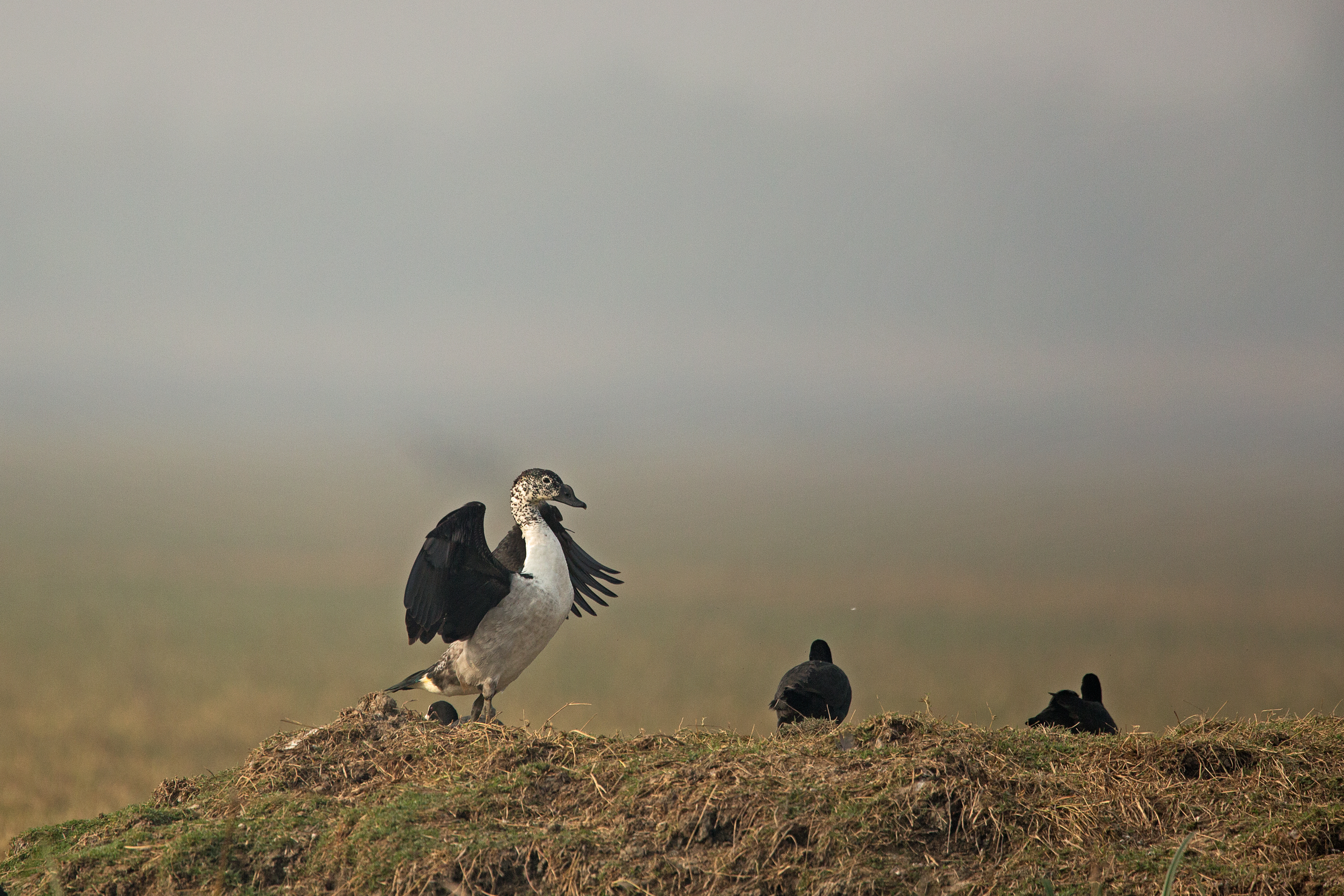
Knob-billed duck alongside Eurasian coot

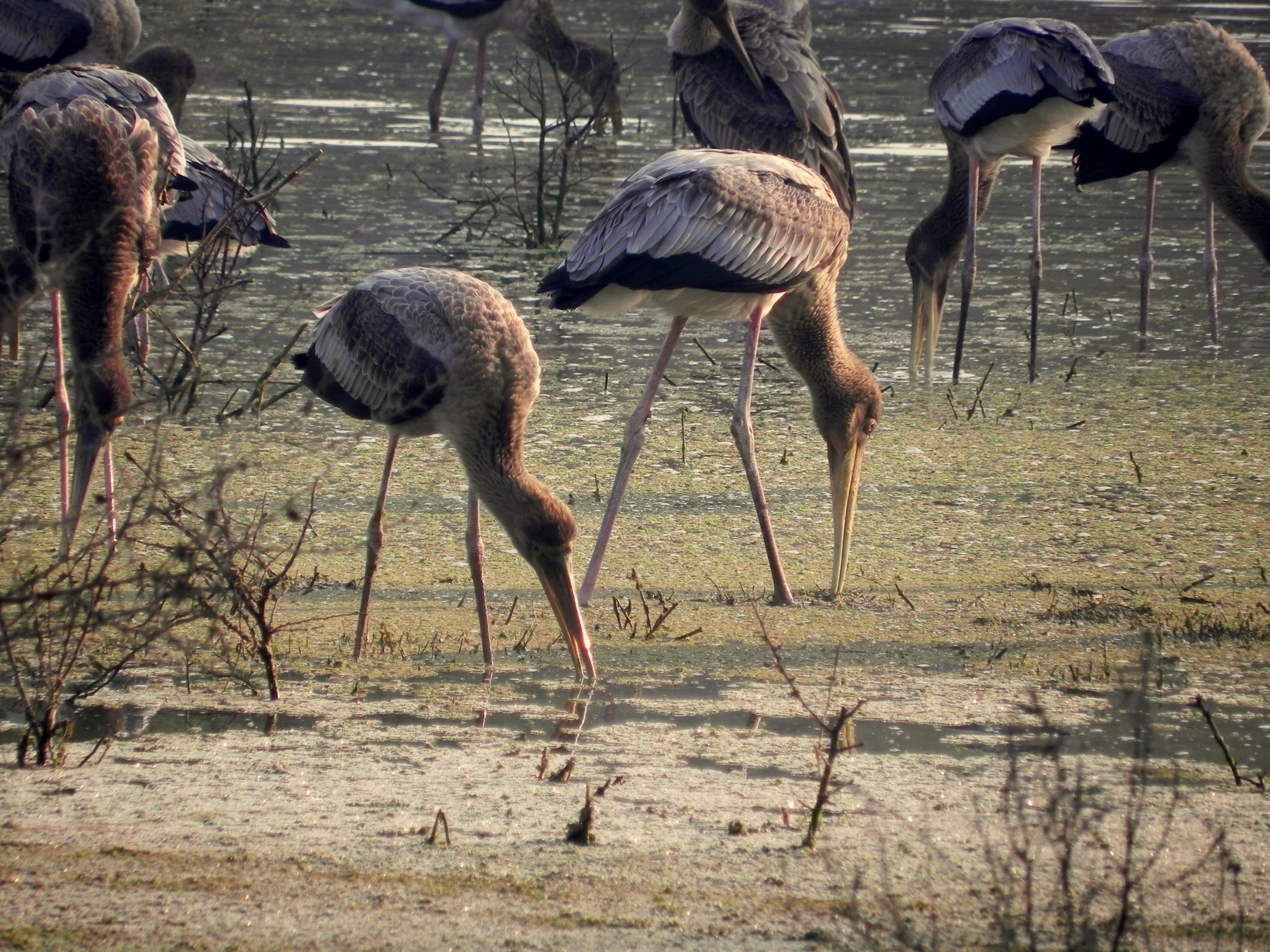
Group of painted storks in one of the wetland habitation in Keoladeo National Park

Macro invertebrates such as worms, insects, and mollusks, though more abundant in variety and numbers than any other group of organisms, are present mostly in aquatic habitats. They are food for many fish and birds, as well as some animal species, and hence, constitute a major link in the food chain and functioning of the ecosystem. Land insects are in abundance and have a positive effect on the breeding of land birds.

==== Birds ====
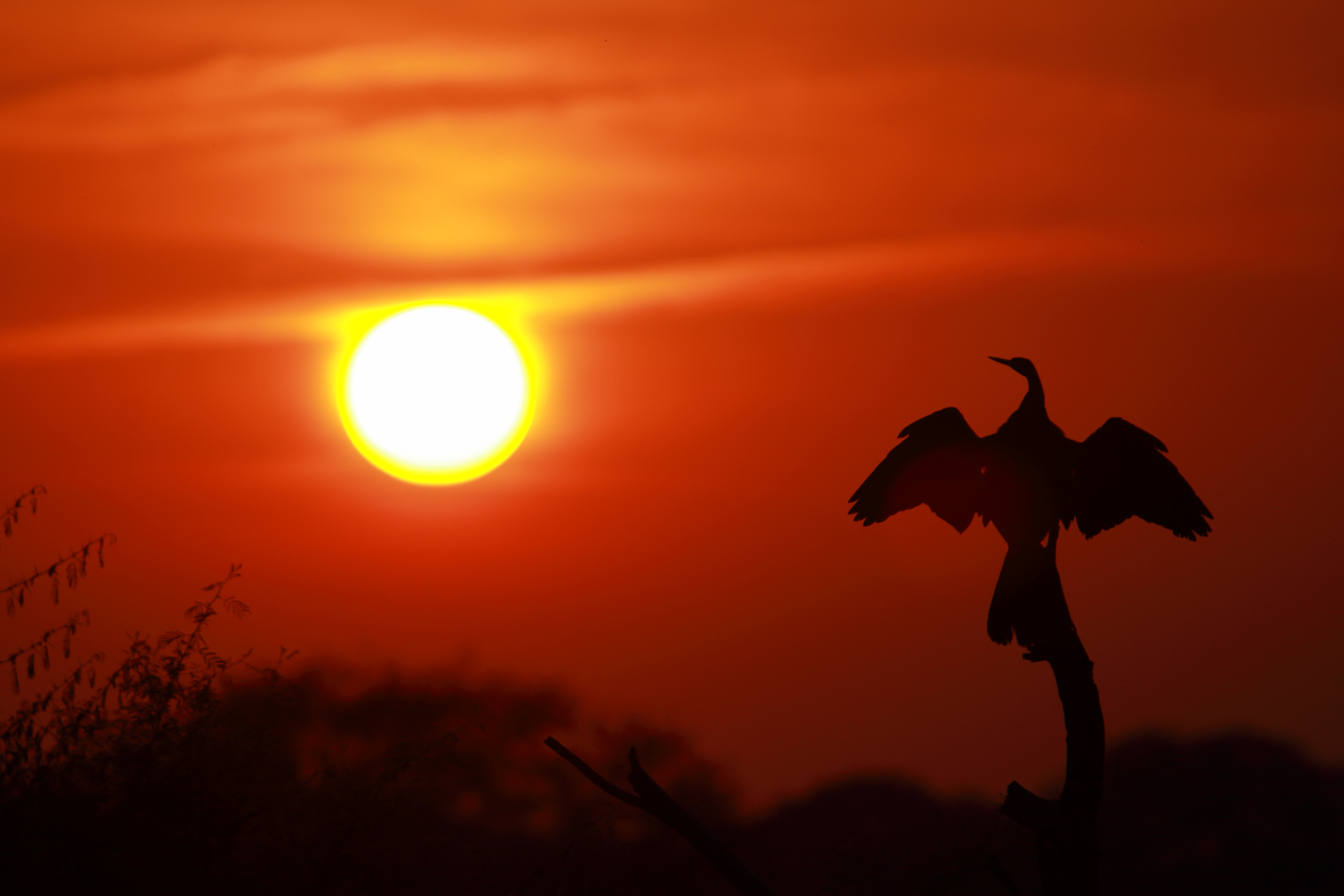
Darter at sunset

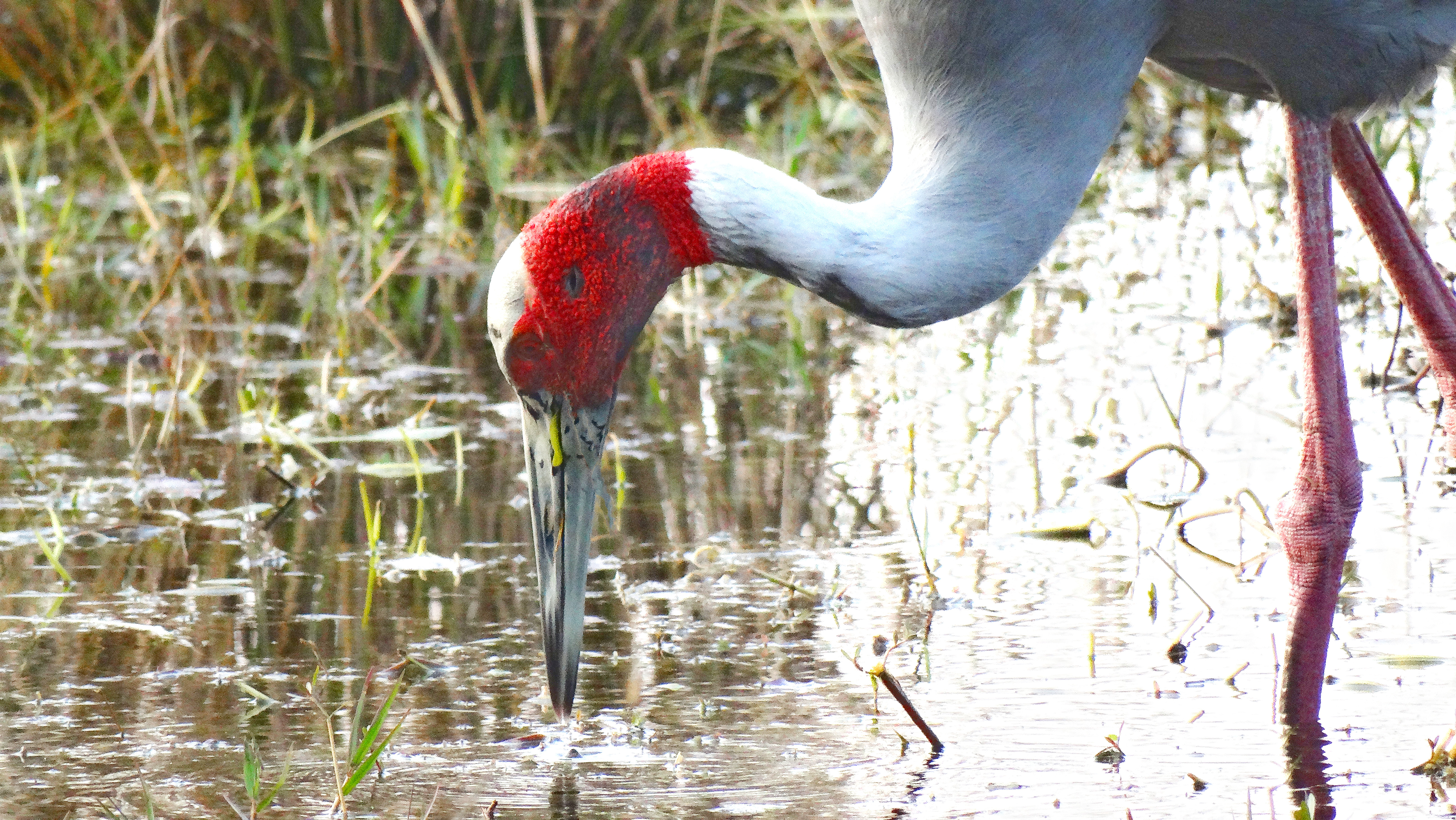
Sarus crane

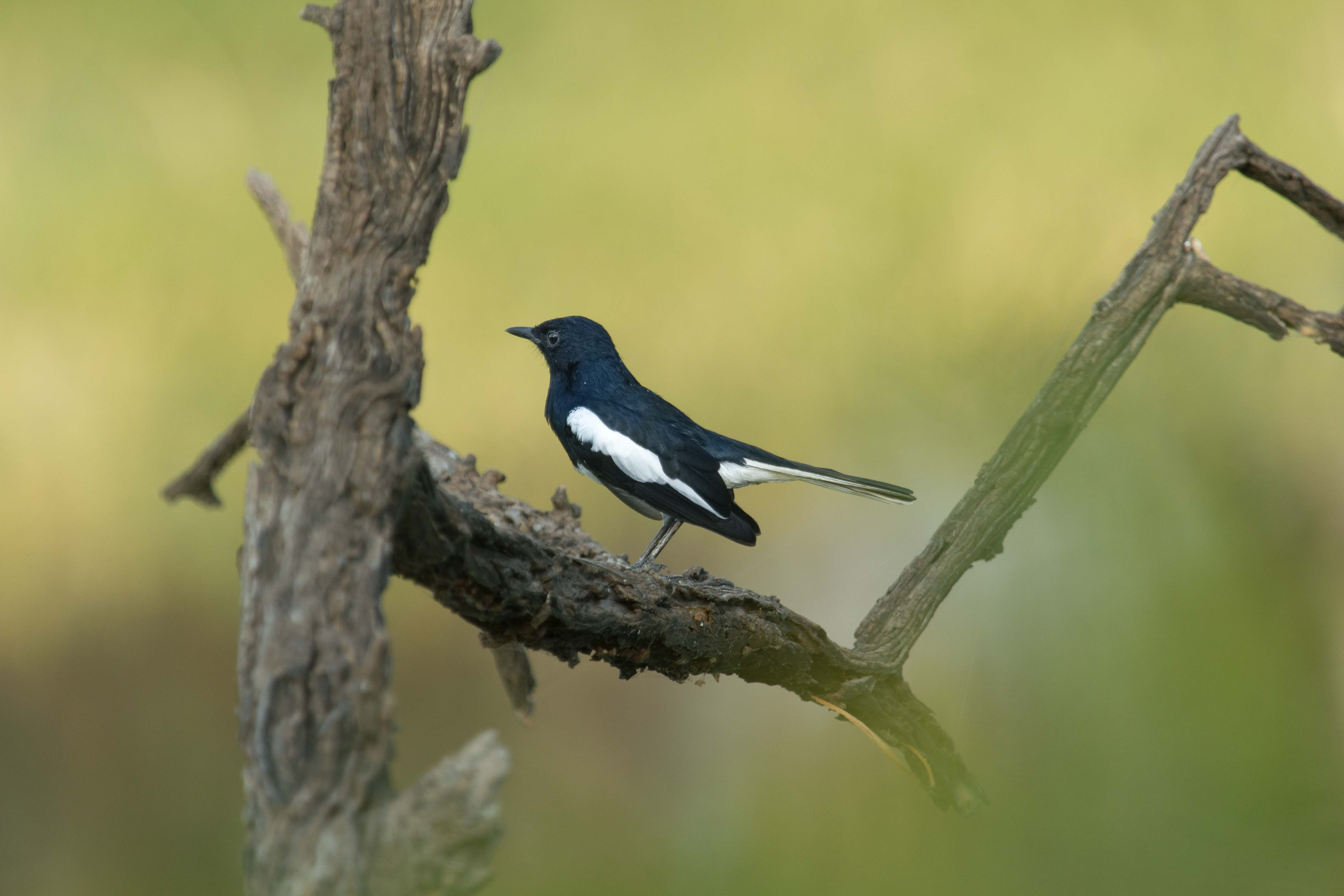
Oriental magpie-robin in Keoladeo National Park

Keoladeo National Park is an important wintering ground for large numbers of migrant birds; the most common waterfowl are gadwall, shoveler, common teal, cotton teal, tufted duck, knob-billed duck, bar-headed goose, little cormorant, great cormorant, Indian shag, ruff, painted stork, white spoonbill, Asian open-billed stork, oriental ibis, darter, common sandpiper, wood sandpiper, green sandpiper, greater flamingos, spot-billed pelican, great white pelican, demoiselle crane and sarus crane.

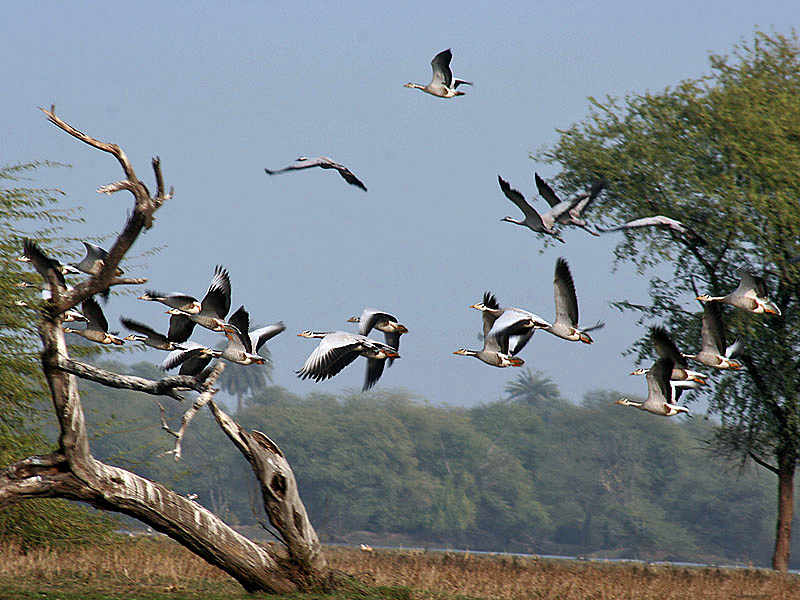
A group of bar-headed geese and Demoiselle cranes

More than 370 bird species have been recorded in Keoladeo National Park. Ornithologically, the park assumes significance in two respects: One because of its strategic location as a staging ground for migratory waterfowl arriving in the Indian subcontinent before dispersing to various regions. Further waterfowl converge here before departing to breeding grounds in the western Palearctic region. In addition, the wetland was a wintering area for the Siberian crane. The last recorded Siberian cranes arrived in the winter of 2001-02. Others birds present include warblers, Old World babblers, bee-eaters, bulbuls, buntings, chats, painted francolins and quails, Indian grey hornbill and Marshall's iora. Raptors include osprey, peregrine falcon, Pallas' sea eagle, short-toed eagle, tawny eagle, imperial eagle, spotted eagle and crested serpent eagle. The greater spotted eagle is breeding here.

==== Mammals ====
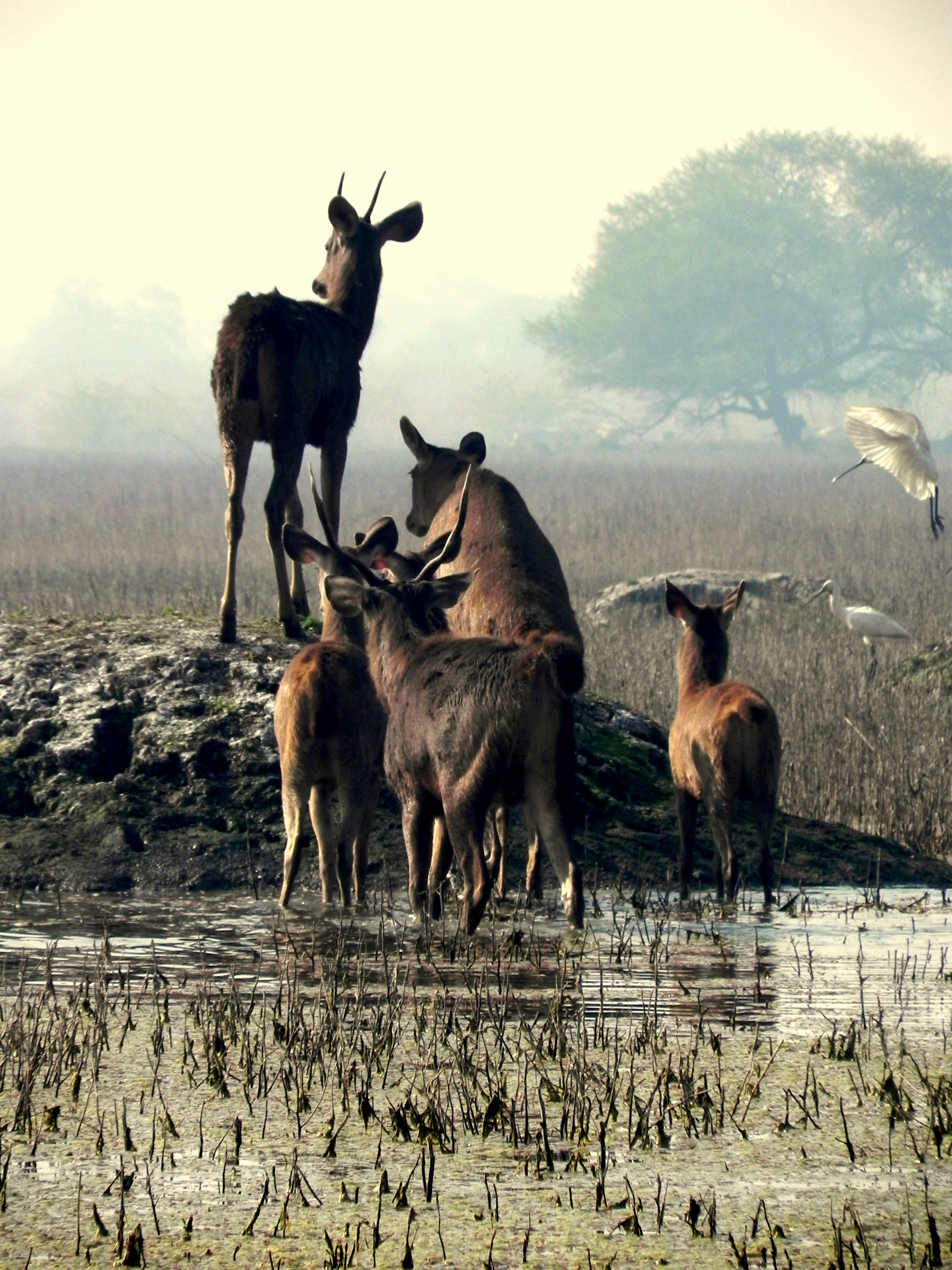
Sambar deer in Keoladeo Ghana National Park

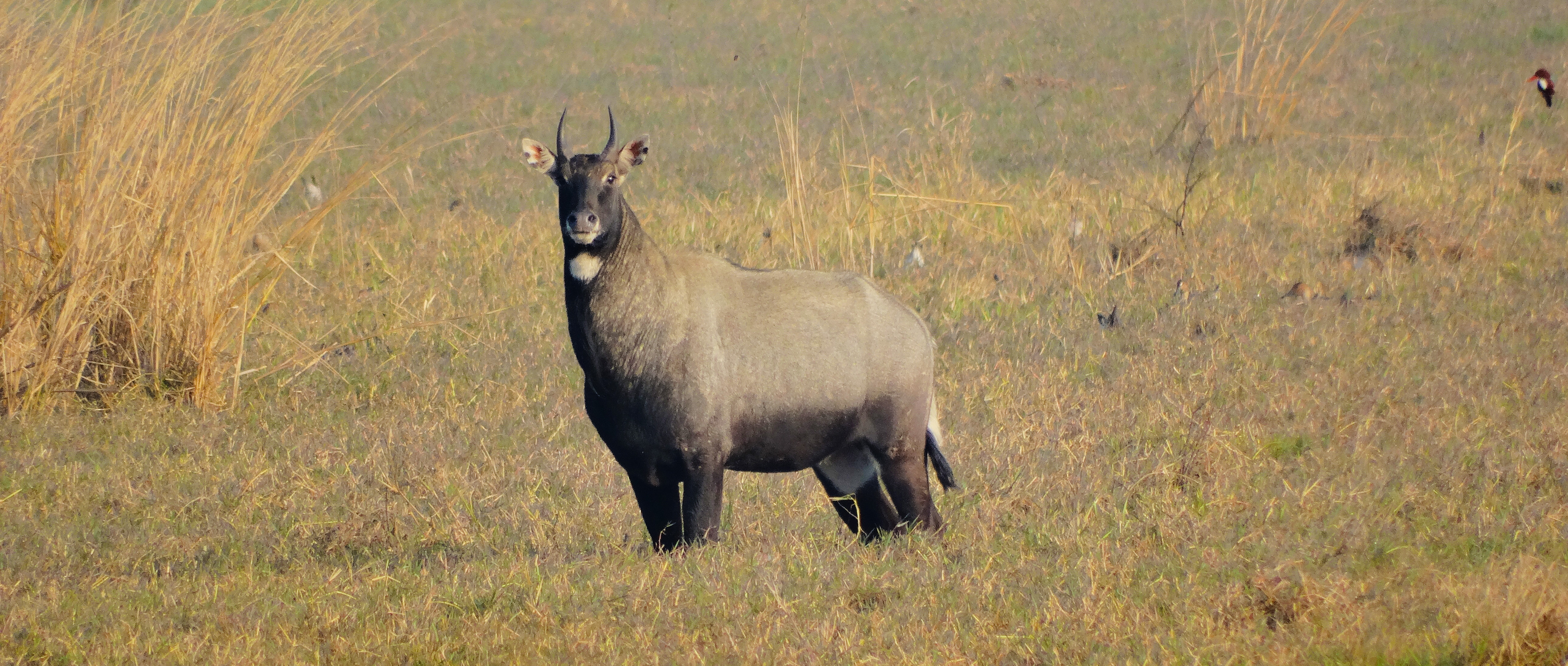
A nilgai inside Keoladeo National Park

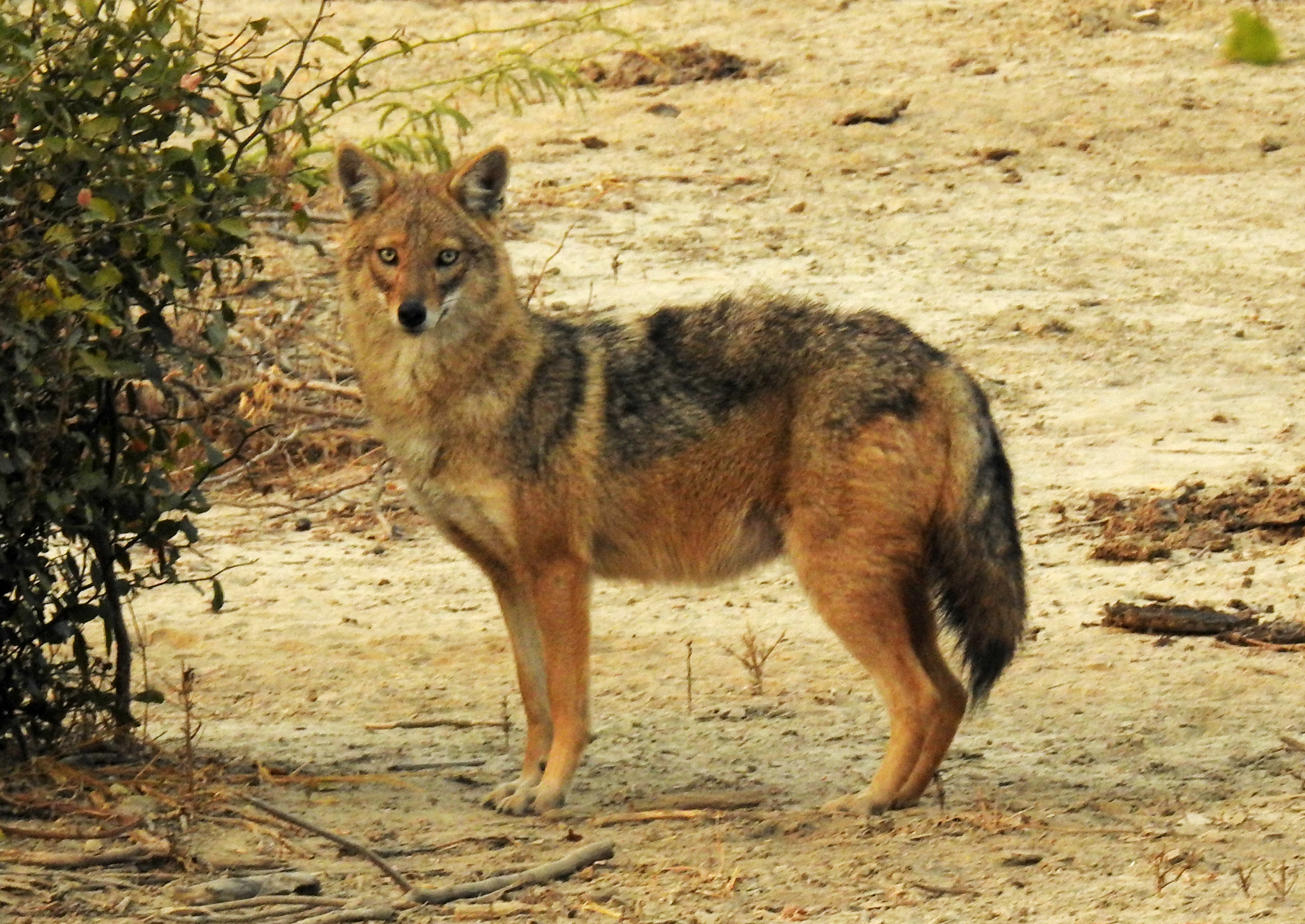
Golden jackal in Keoladeo National Park

Mammalian fauna of Keoladeo National Park is equally rich with 27 identified species. Primates include rhesus macaque and Hanuman langur. Ungulates are represented by nilgai, chital deer, sambar, blackbuck, Indian hog deer and wild boar.

Indian porcupine, small Indian mongoose and Indian gray mongoose are occasionally sighted. Cat species present jungle cat, leopard cat and fishing cat. Carnivores include Asian palm civet, small Indian civet, Bengal fox, golden jackals, striped hyena and smooth-coated otter. Many species of rats, mice, gerbils and bats also inhabit the park.

==== Reptiles and amphibians ====
The herpetofauna of Keoladeo National Park is diverse. Out of the ten species of turtles in Rajasthan, seven are present in this park. Besides this, there are five lizard species including monitor lizard, thirteen snake species including pythons, krait, cobra and Russell's viper; seven species of amphibians include bullfrog and skipper frog occurring in the wetlands.

== Constraints ==
Some 2,500 cattle and domestic water buffalo were allowed in the area up until November 1982 when grazing was banned. Predictably, the ban led to a buildup of local resentment, resulting in an attempted forced entry into the park. Police opened fire and eight people were killed: tensions still remain high. The absence of grazing is causing management problems as vegetation, principally Paspalum distichum, a perennial amphibious grass, blocks up the channels. The Rajasthan government has rejected a proposal from the Bombay Natural History Society to allow limited grazing, since this would conflict with the law. Furthermore, recycled nutrients from the large quantity of dung deposited by livestock probably supported considerable numbers of insects.

The presence of some 700 feral cattle within the park is cause for concern as they compete with wildlife for valuable forage. Larvae of the Lepidopteran Parapoynx diminutalis has also been a serious pest, and considerably inhibited the growth of Nymphoides cristatum during June–July 1986. High levels of pollutants in Ajan Bund are believed to be responsible for the increasing number of piscivorous birds seen in a dazed state and unable to fly. Fewer birds were recorded in 1984 than in previous years. Four sarus cranes and 40 ring-necked doves were found dead outside the park during 1988 and early 1989, possibly due to pesticide poisoning, and a study of the impact of pesticide use in surrounding areas on the park has been initiated in addition to studies on heavy metal contamination. Disturbance from visitors can be a cause for concern, especially during December and January when visitors come to see the cranes.

== Scientific research and facilities ==
Between December 1992 and January 1995, a collaborative project between the Governments of India and Russia, International Crane Foundation and Wild Bird Society of Japan was set up to save the Siberian crane. The project focused on releasing captivity bred cranes into the wild, tracking migratory routes of common cranes, and building up the resident crane population in the park. Although the project did not yield the desired results, the successful survival of introduced cranes in the park has given sufficient hope to develop a viable resident population in the future.

== Crisis of 2007 ==
A severe drought caused severe harm to the park and its flora and fauna in 2007.

A proposal for water supply to Keoladeo National Park, Bharatpur was forwarded by the Government of Rajasthan seeking assistance from Planning Commission as advised and approved by the Ministry of Environment and Forests (MoEF) vide their letter dated 10.04.2008. As per the MoEF, the proposal is beyond the purview of the existing centrally sponsored scheme of the MoEF, seems to be viable and has the potential to put an end to the eternal water scarcity in Bharatpur National Park.

The Keoladeo National Park is a Ramsar Wetland Site and a World Heritage Site. Due to acute water scarcity, the ecosystem of the Park has been affected badly and this has resulted in reduction in the arrival of migratory birds in the National Park. Water supply is essential for the National Park, which is a wetland and a Ramsar site facing acute shortage of water for the last few years. Currently, apart from rainfall the Park receives water from "Ajan Bund", a temporary reservoir via the Dakan canal. Through a small canal dug last year water from Khokhar Weir (Bees Mora) is also available. The total requirement of water for the Park is estimated at 14.17 million cubic meters (500 MCft). The supply from Ajan Bund is irregular and subject to the bund being full to the extent of reservoir level at 8.5 meters. During the last several years either water is not supplied or supplied insufficiently.

The project had been prepared to keep in view the need for 400 MCFT of water during late July to August, for a period of 30 days to the Park which is to be had by diverting and lifting flood waters of Yamuna. The project thus covered diversion of water during monsoon through underground pipes with lifting arrangements over a length of 16 km from the off-take point of Goverdhan drain near Santruk village. The estimated cost of the project as proposed by the State Government was to the tune of Rs. 650 million. The project proposed was to channelize water from Govardhan drain to meet the water deficit of KNP during the months of July to September at the time of requirement. The major components of the project were construction of a head regulator with control gate at the drain located in the state, raw water reservoir with capacity of 13,000 m, 3 pump houses, DG sets for pumping station and laying and testing of /PCC/MS pipelines.

== See also ==
- Arid Forest Research Institute (AFRI)
- Kanwar Taal Bird Sanctuary
- Sultanpur Bird Sanctuary
