= List of cultural properties of Japan – historical materials (Gunma) =

This list is of the cultural properties of Japan designated in the category of historical materials (歴史資料, rekishi shiryō) for the Prefecture of Gunma.

== National Cultural Properties ==
As of 1 May 2015, one Important Cultural Property has been designated, being of national significance.

Property	Date	Municipality	Ownership	Comments	Image	Coordinates	Ref.
Administrative documents of Gunma Prefecture 群馬県行政文書; Gunma-ken gyōsei bunsho	Meiji/Shōwa period	Maebashi	Gunma Prefecture (kept at Gunma Prefectural Archives (群馬県立文書館))	17,858 items		36°22′36″N 139°05′16″E	

== Prefectural Cultural Properties ==
As of 24 March 2015, five properties have been designated at a prefectural level.

Property	Date	Municipality	Ownership	Comments	Image	Coordinates	Ref.
Ishikura documents 石倉文書; Ishikura monjo	1578-80	Isesaki	private (kept at Aikawa Archaeological Museum (相川考古館))			36°19′07″N 139°11′29″E	
Japanese mathematical materials of the Nakasone Family 中曽根家和算資料; Nakasone-ke wasan shiryō		Takasaki	private	404 items			
Materials relating to Shima Kakoku and his wife Shima Ryū 島霞谷・隆夫妻関係資料; Shima Kakoku・Ryū fusai kankei shiryō	C19	Takasaki	private (kept at Gunma Prefectural Museum of History)	1,028 items		36°17′55″N 139°04′46″E	
Genroku Kōzuke Kuniezu 元禄上野国絵図; Genroku Kōzuke kuni e-zu	1702	Maebashi	Gunma Prefecture (kept at Gunma Prefectural Archives (群馬県立文書館))			36°22′36″N 139°05′16″E	
Ono Choku documents 小野直文書; Ono Choku monjo	Bakumatsu/early Meiji period	Annaka	Annaka City (kept at Annaka City Gakushu-no-Mori (安中市学習の森))	2,884 documents, 80 paintings etc.		36°17′31″N 138°53′39″E	

== See also ==
- Cultural Properties of Japan
- List of Historic Sites of Japan (Gunma)
- Gunma Prefectural Museum of History
- List of National Treasures of Japan (historical materials)
- List of Cultural Properties of Japan - paintings (Gunma)
