= Annakacygna =

Annakacygna Temporal range: Late Miocene (Tortonian), 11.5 Ma

Scientific classification
- Kingdom: Animalia
- Phylum: Chordata
- Class: Aves
- Order: Anseriformes
- Family: Anatidae
- Subfamily: Anserinae
- Tribe: Cygnini
- Genus: †Annakacygna; Matsuoka & Hasegawa, 2022

Type species
- †Annakacygna hajimei Matsuoka & Hasegawa, 2022

Other species
- †A. yoshiiensis Matsuoka & Hasegawa, 2022

Extinct genus of birds

Annakacygna is a genus of flightless marine swan from the Miocene of Japan. Named in 2022, Annakacygna displays a series of unique adaptations setting it apart from any other known swan, including a filter feeding lifestyle, a highly mobile tail and wings that likely formed a cradle for their hatchlings in a fashion similar to modern mute swans. Additionally, it may have used both wings and tail as a form of display. All of these traits combined have led the researchers working on it to dub it "the ultimate bird". Two species are known, A. hajimei, which was approximately the size of a black swan, and A. yoshiiensis which exceeded the mute swan in both size and weight. The describing authors proposed the vernacular name Annaka short-winged swan for the genus.

== History and naming ==
The type specimen (GMNH-PV-678) of Annakacygna is a nearly complete, almost articulate skeleton discovered in the year 2000 by Hajime Nakajima close to the Usui river, Annaka, Gunma. The fossils were found encased in a slab of siltstone in sediments of the Haraichi Formation, a Miocene formation preserving a marine environment. Early research believed it to be a relative of Megalodytes, a flightless bird from the Miocene of western North America. Preparation of the material however showed that Annakacygna was a distinct taxon and it was described as such by Hiroshige Matsuoka and Yoshikazu Hasegawa in 2022. The second species, only known from a distal tibiotarsus (GMNH-PV-1685) unearthed in 1995, was collected from the riverbed of the Kabura River, 11.5 km further southeast than the remains of the type species. This fossil was donated to the Gunma Museum of Natural History in 2005.

The name Annakacygna is a combination of the town Annaka and the feminine form of the Latin "cygnus", meaning swan. A. hajimei was named after its discoverer, Hajime Nakajima, while A. yoshiiensis was named after the town of Yoshii-machi near its type locality.

== Description ==
The skull of the holotype is crushed and missing most of the rostrum, however based on the preserved mandible a length of 10 cm (3.9 in) has been estimated for the upper beak. The head of the animal was proportionally large and it is described as "head-heavy" by the authors. A bony shelf extends over the posterior parts of the orbits, which meets the postorbital process and forms a dorsal notch thought to represent a salt gland. The lacrimal bones are V-shaped and highly unusual due to the fact that they are not fused together. The origin for the lower jaw depressor is massive and they meet dorsally to form a false sagital crest. This is not seen in any other known bird. The musculature of the lower jaw, specifically the adductor mandibulae externus profundus, leaves a wide and deep impression in the bone indicating its origin. The element itself is quite thin and a single antero-posteriorly oriented condyle serves as a point of articulation for the mandible. This is unique to Annakacygna and may be tied to retracting the upper jaw. The mandible itself shows exceptionally long and slender mandibular rami that are deeply bowed when viewed from the side. The coronoid process is set far back, with the distance between it and the posterior articular surface only being a fourth of the length of the mandibular rami. The tip of the mandible is poorly preserved, thin and fragile, but based on the preserved elements the lower jaw would have had a somewhat spoon-like shape.

Seventeen cervical and thoracic vertebrae are known and although many are distorted, they are well enough preserved to reveal their position within the skeleton. Subsequently, Matsuoka and Hasegawa managed to determine the presence of twenty-three neck and seven thoracic vertebrae. They are generally similar to those of the extant Black swan (Cygnus atratus), however notably wider and heavier than any modern Cygnus species. Despite the more robust and shorter vertebrae, the neck of Annakacygna was still long and flexible. The sternum is poorly preserved, but shows only weak attachment for the coracobrachialis muscle and the coracoid resembles that of the flightless sea duck Chendytes from Pleistocene North America. The scapula is much stronger than those of extant flying anseriformes with a better developed scapulohumeralis caudalis muscle and initially does not resemble that of a flightless animal. Both humerus are preserved and are similar in length to those of Black swans, but with an unusually straight shaft lacking a pronounced sigmoid curve. Only in lateral or medial view can the remnants of the curvature be seen, expressed in an ʃ-shape. The proximal head is large and well developed, both proportionally and absolutely larger than in the whooper swan (Cygnus cygnus). The distal end is much smaller and the entire bone is thickened. The ulna is straight and incredibly short, only 57% the length of the humerus, while in modern swans the ulna and humerus are of almost equal length. The radius is highly unusual among birds. It is also shortened and shows a round crosssection towards its proximal end, before widening and flatting as it moves away from the humerus. The articulation with the humerus is reduced. The radiale is proportionally large while the carpometacarpus is reduced in length, but retaining strong articular surfaces that indicate that the element was still used. The wing phalanges are barely recognizable.

The pelvis is almost completely preserved and would be gently arched if accounting for the preservation of the fossil. Three caudal vertebrae are preserved and much better developed than the caudal's in other birds. The caudal's contribution to the stiffened synsacrum is short, another highly unusual feature. The tarsometatarsus is narrow with an elliptical cross section, an adaptation observed in grebes and loons that helps reduce drag while moving through water.

The second species, A. yoshiiensis, is only known from the distal end of a tibiotarsus, which stands apart from the type materiel due to its greater size. This bone is 1.3 times larger than the corresponding material in A. haijimei, which lead the authors to believe that it should represent a species distinct from the type.

== Paleobiology ==
=== Diet ===
Although the upper beak is not preserved, based on the anatomy of the mandible it was likely long and deep with a forward spreading form superficially resembling modern shovelers. The unique jaw musculature indicated by the cranial and mandibular bones suggests that Annakocygna moved its jaws in a somewhat seesaw-like motion, which is unlike anything observed in extant swans. While the lower jaw moved back, the upper jaw would have retracted at the same time, which has been interpreted to mean that Annakocygna was a highly derived filter feeder. Subsequently, the beak was likely lined with soft lamellae to support this planktivorous diet.

=== Parental care ===
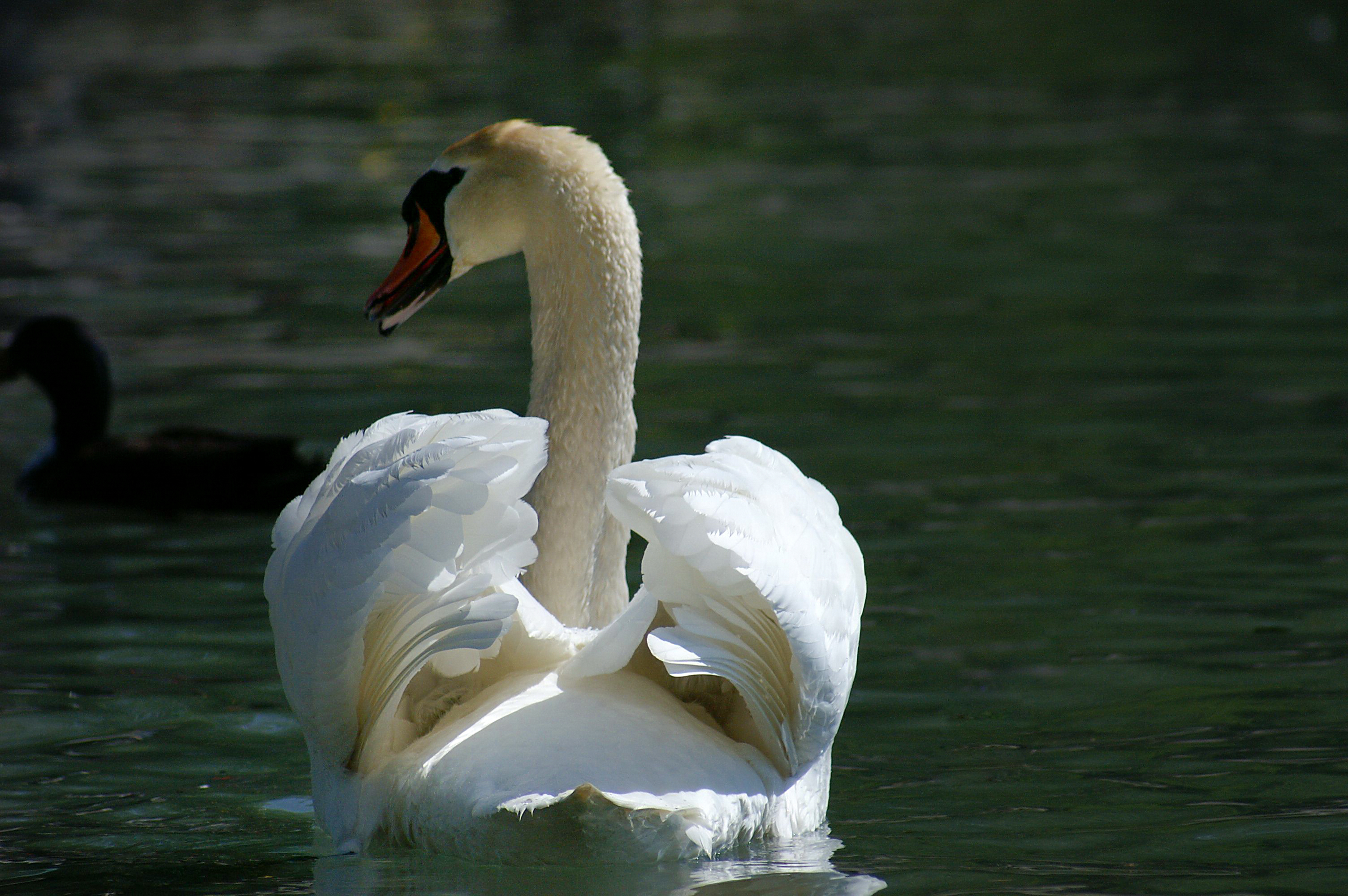
Mute swan with wings in a "piggyback" position

Like in geese and the coscoroba swan (Coscoroba coscoroba), the pelvis is wide and short and does not resemble the long and narrow pelvis of birds using their feet to swim. However, the foot of Annakacygna show the opposite, resembling those of foot-propelled seabirds. Matsuoka and Hasegawa suggest that the pelvis may have been a specific adaptation to stabilize the bird while at sea. The strangely long and robust caudal meanwhile, together with other adaptations of the pubic area, would have likely given the bird an exceptionally strong and mobile tail.

While the wings clearly show that it was flightless, the arm bones while shortened do not show the same kind of reduction observed in other flightless birds and instead rather show a different specialisation. The shoulder joint was highly mobile, allowing the wings to move back to a great extent with musculature supporting this movement usually only observed when birds fold their wings. To the contrary, the wrist joint was restrictive, allowing the phalanges to only fold to a position of approximately 60° and flex to a position of 135°. Additionally, the ulnimetacarpalis ventralis muscle would have allowed the hands to "hyperpronate", elevating the primary feathers upward beyond the wrist itself. A similar positioning of the wings is observed in several modern species of swan that carry their young in a "piggyback" style, elevating their wings slightly while juveniles rest on the adults. All three species displaying such behavior are also notably less vocal than other swan species, instead using their wings for communication.

Due to this combination of skeletal elements and the corresponding musculature, Matsuoka and Hasegawa propose that Annakocygna used its highly specialised wings as a cradle for its young in a fashion similar to extant mute swans. The mobile tail could have possibly served as part of this cradle, being raised to protect the back. Additionally, both wings and tail may have been utilized not just to protect their young, but also as displays to attract and communicate with mates.

=== Locomotion ===
The feet of Annakacygna are similar in morphology to that of modern diving birds like loons and grebes, showing the same narrowing of the tarsometatarsus, but lacking the shortening of the femur. Although the authors do not believe it to have been a deep diver, it shows none the less a clear adaptation to life in the ocean. Furthermore the tibiotarsus appears similar to a variety of other marine or diving birds including albatrosses, anhingas and sulids. The ankle joints had strong dorsiflexion and it's hypothesized that the webbed feet would have been passively folded in life. The thickened bones likely helped the bird's lifestyle. Pachyostotic bones are commonly associated with diving, as they make the animal heavier, but in the case of Annakacygna it is more likely that they helped stabilize the animal at sea while foraging.

=== Paleoenvironment ===
Both species of Annakacygna are found in the middle layers of the Miocene Haraichi Formation, which preserves a marine environment. Other animals found in the formation include the desmostylian Paleoparadoxia, sharks, allodesmine seals and a variety of cetaceans like Joumocetus, Kentriodon and Norisdelphis.
