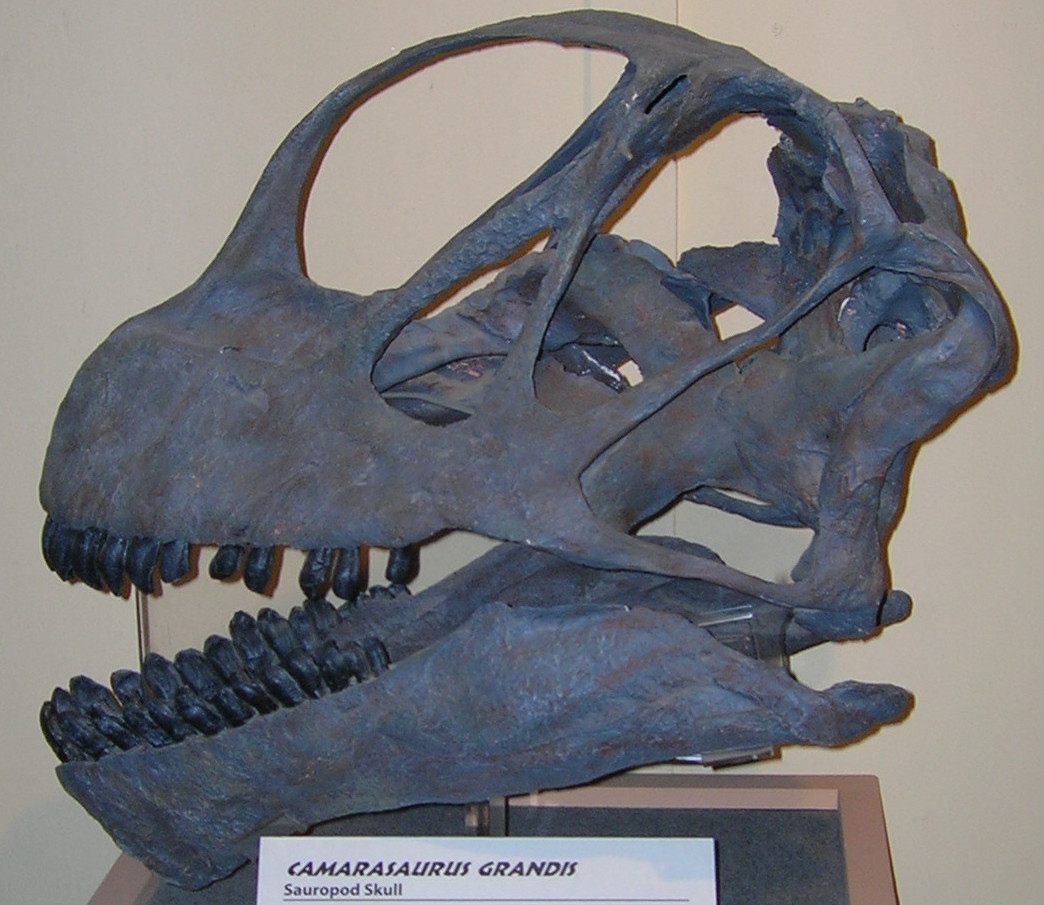
- Cast of a Camarasaurus grandis skull at the Dinosaur Journey Museum

Scientific classification
- Kingdom: Animalia
- Phylum: Chordata
- Class: Reptilia
- Clade: Dinosauria
- Clade: Saurischia
- Clade: †Sauropodomorpha
- Clade: †Sauropoda
- Clade: †Macronaria
- Family: †Camarasauridae
- Genus: †Camarasaurus
- Species: †C. grandis

Binomial name
- †Camarasaurus grandis (Marsh, 1877)

Synonyms
- Apatosaurus grandis Marsh, 1877; Morosaurus grandis (Marsh, 1877) Marsh, 1878; Morosaurus impar Marsh, 1878; Morosaurus robustus Marsh, 1878; Pleurocoelus montanus Marsh, 1896; Camarasaurus impar (Marsh, 1878) Gilmore, 1925; Camarasaurus robustus (Marsh, 1878) Gilmore, 1925; Cathetosaurus lewisi? Jensen, 1988; Camarasaurus lewisi? (Jensen, 1988) McIntosh, 1990

= Camarasaurus grandis =

Camarasaurus grandis Temporal range: Late Jurassic, 153–148 Ma

Extinct species of dinosaur

Camarasaurus grandis is an extinct species of sauropod dinosaur in the genus Camarasaurus that lived during the Jurassic in what is now the western United States. It is the geologically oldest of the four species of the genus Camarasaurus.

== Taxonomy ==
Camarasaurus grandis was named by Othniel Charles Marsh in 1877. It is one of four valid species of Camarasaurus, alongside Camarasaurus lentus, Camarasaurus lewisi, and Camarasaurus supremus. The type specimen of Camarasaurus grandis is the holotype YPM 1901, a partial skeleton of an immature individual from Como Bluff, Wyoming. There are numerous specimens of Camarasaurus grandis, and the majority of the skeleton is known.

Camarasaurus grandis is regarded as having three junior synonyms: Morosaurus impar, Morosaurus robustus, and Pleurocoelus montanus.

- Morosaurus impar is the type species of Morosaurus, the genus to which C. grandis and C. lentus were assigned until it was synonymized with Camarasaurus. It was named in by Marsh in 1878 on the basis of a sacrum that had been found in the Morrison Formation at Como Bluff. The species is now considered a synonym of C. grandis.
- Morosaurus robustus was named by Marsh in 1878 on the basis of an ilium that had been collected from the Morrison Formation at Como Bluff. It has also been considered a synonym of C. grandis.
- Pleurocoelus montanus was named in by Marsh in 1896 as a species of Pleurocoelus, a sauropod from the Cretaceous of Maryland, on the basis of several vertebral centra and assorted bones of a juvenile sauropod that were found in the Morrison Formation at Como Bluff. It is generally regarded as a synonym of C. grandis.

Amphicoelias latus is generally regarded as a synonym of C. supremus as of 2021, although one 1998 study by Kenneth Carpenter considered it a synonym of C. grandis, based on where its type specimen was found. C. grandis's contemporary, C. lewisi, may also be synonymous with Camarasaurus grandis. The holotype of C. lentus may be a specimen of C. grandis, rather than the species conventionally known as C. lentus.

== Description ==
Camarasaurus grandis was a moderately-sized member of its genus, similar in size to C. lentus but smaller than C. supremus. Gregory S. Paul estimated its length as 14 metres (46 ft) and mass as 13 tonnes, whereas John Foster estimated its length as 15 metres (49 ft) and mass as 12.6 tonnes for an average-sized individual, with large individuals reaching over 16.5 tonnes.

The anterior dorsal vertebrae of Camarasaurus grandis are one of the most distinctive parts of the skeleton. The vertebrae are much taller than in C. lentus and C. supremus. The vertebrae are also unusual in the position of the connections between the neural arch and centrum, known as the neurocentral synostoses. In most reptiles, including Camarasaurus lentus, the neurocentral synostoses lie at the level of the ventral margin of the neural arch. In contrast, in C. grandis, the neurocentral synostoses are elevated above the level of the neural canal, with raised pedicels on the centrum separating the neural arch from the articular faces of the centrum. The centrum can completely surround the canal, resulting in a neural arch that does not actually form an arch over the neural canal. This characteristic is only visible in juveniles.

C. grandis differs from C. lentus in having T-shaped expansions of its anterior caudal neural spines.

== History of study ==
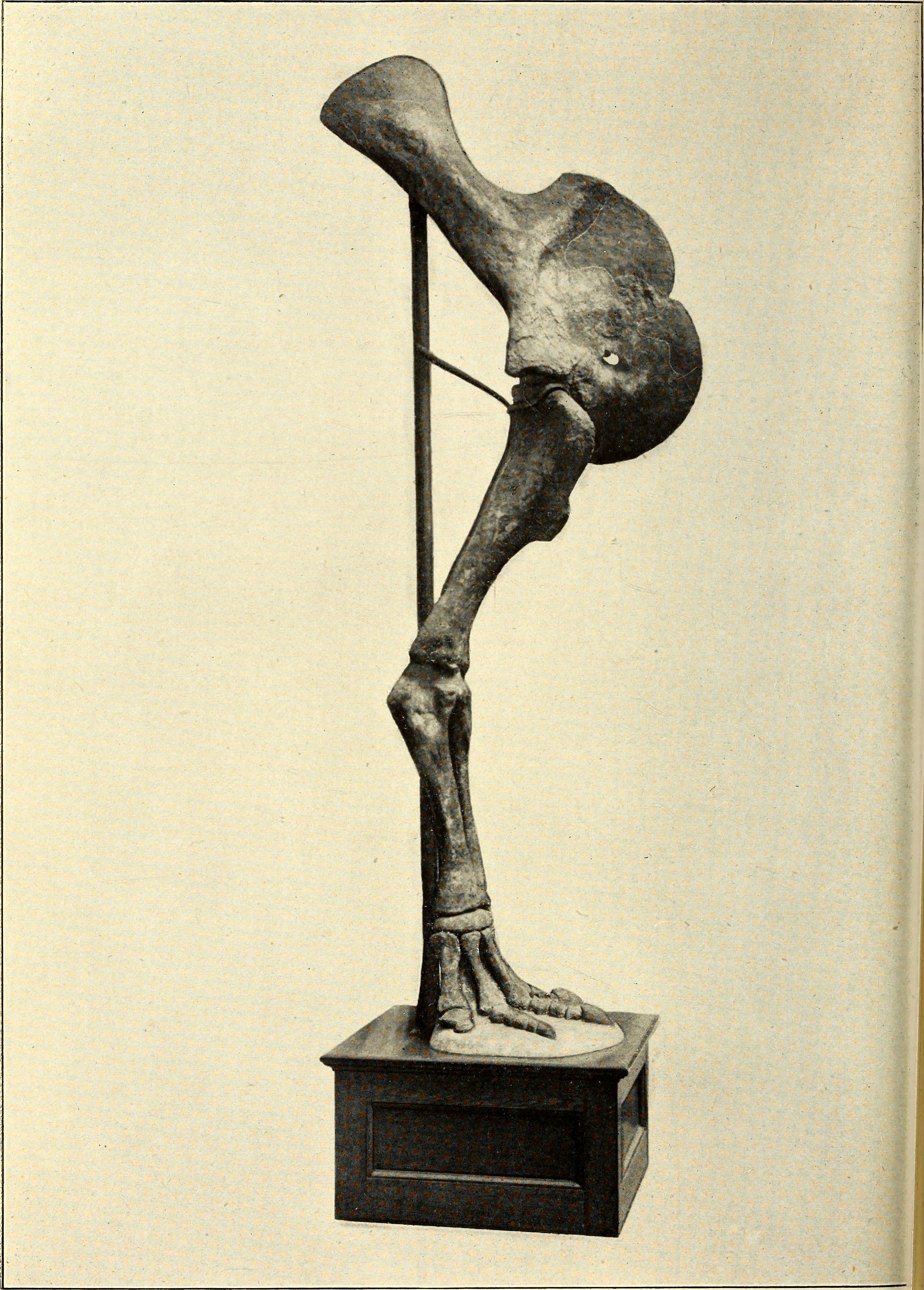
Forelimb of Camarasaurus grandis mounted at the Field Museum in 1901.

In 1877 during the Yale Peabody Museum's expedition to Como Bluff, William Harlow Reed and several other field workers for Othniel Charles Marsh collected a basioccipital and partial postcranial skeleton. Camarasaurus grandis was named by Marsh in 1877 on the specimen (YPM 1901). He initially considered it a species of Apatosaurus. The next year, Marsh named another new species, Morosaurus impar, and shortly thereafter reclassified Apatosaurus grandis as Morosaurus grandis and named a third species, Morosaurus robustus. The type specimens of M. impar and M. robustus could be from the same individual as YPM 1901. Additional material of C. lentus would be collected between 1877 and 1879 by YPM crews, including some skull material. In 1896, Marsh named another species of Sauropod from Como Bluff, Pleurocoelus montanus, based on a fragmentary postcranial skeleton of a juvenile from. The species was later synonymized with C. grandis. All of the material found at Como Bluff came from the Kimmeridgian of the Morrison Formation.

During the Second Dinosaur Rush in 1900, crews of the Field Museum of Natural History collected several appendicular and axial elements, including a nearly complete forelimb, near Fruita, Colorado. The C. grandis material from Fruita led to new reconstructions of Sauropod manus and pes structure. In 1898, Samuel Wendell Williston regarded M. impar as synonymous with M. grandis. In 1901, Elmer Riggs recognized that Morosaurus was a junior synonym of Camarasaurus. C. robustus was suggested to be synonymous with C. grandis in 1930 by Richard S. Lull. In 1958, Theodore E. White synonymized C. grandis with C. supremus. This proposed synonymy has not been upheld by subsequent study.

A specimen of Camarasaurus grandis was excavated in New Mexico in 1978, and was one of the first partial skeletons from the Morrison Formation to be excavated in the state. It was initially reported as a specimen of C. cf. supremus in 1982, but reinterpreted as C. grandis in 2005.

A relatively complete skeleton of Camarasaurus grandis, GMNH-PV 101, was described in 1996. However, an unpublished study by Emanuel Tschopp and colleagues presented at the 2014 meeting of the Society of Vertebrate Paleontology suggested that this specimen may have closer affinities to Camarasaurus lewisi, which they argued represented a distinct genus, Cathetosaurus.

== Paleoecology ==
Camarasaurus grandis lived during the Kimmeridgian age of the Jurassic in what is now Wyoming, Colorado, and New Mexico. It is one of the more common species of Camarasaurus, with 9.1% of known Camarasaurus specimens identified as C. grandis (the majority of specimens cannot be identified as belonging to any particular species).

A specimen of C. grandis from New Mexico showed signs of having been fed on by Allosaurus.

Camarasaurus grandis is the geologically oldest species of Camarasaurus, and may be ancestral to the later species of the genus.
