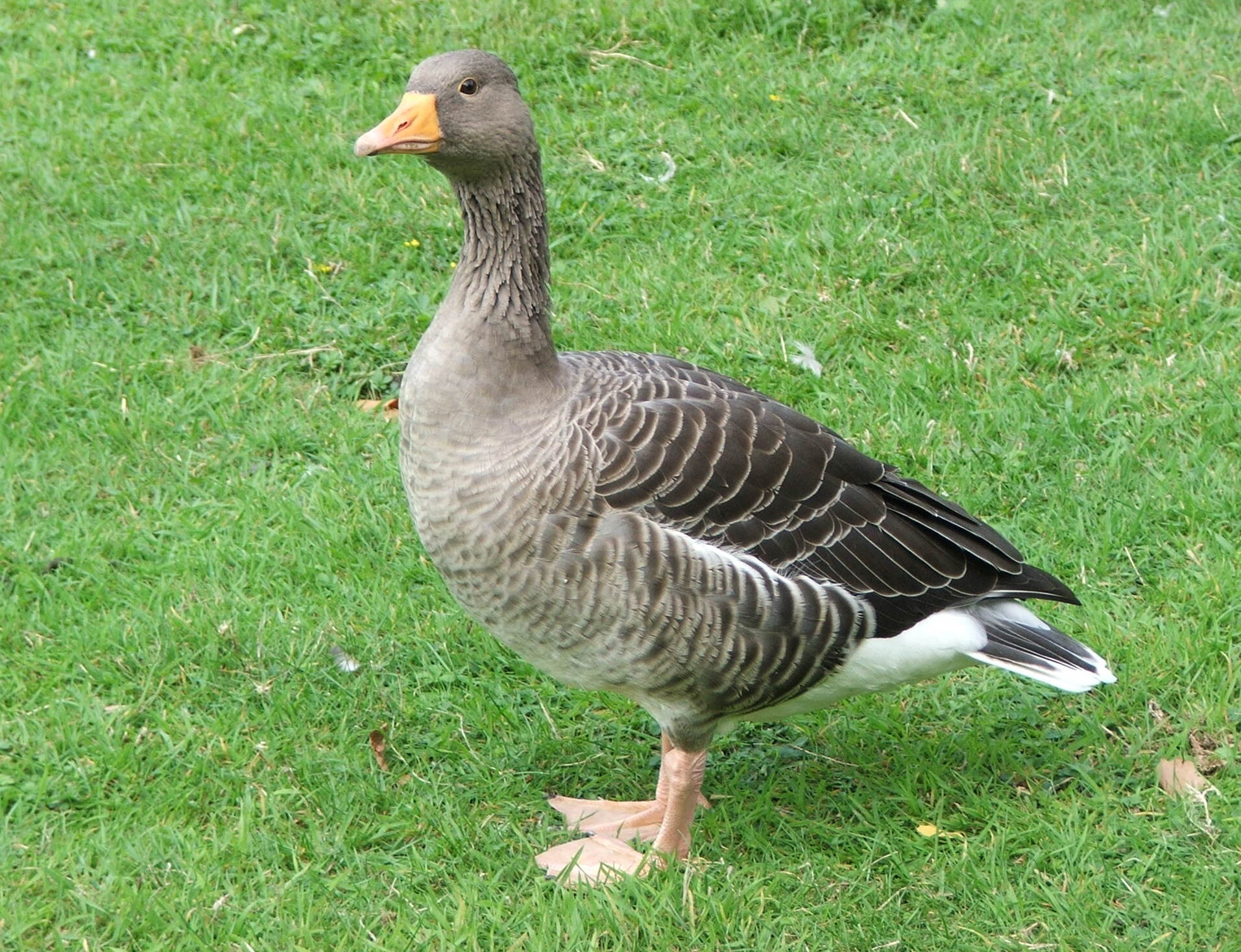
- A greylag goose (Anser anser)

Scientific classification
- Kingdom: Animalia
- Phylum: Chordata
- Class: Aves
- Order: Anseriformes
- Superfamily: Anatoidea
- Family: Anatidae

= Goose =

Common name for a group of waterfowl

A goose (pl.: geese) is a bird of any of several waterfowl species in the family Anatidae. This group comprises the genera Anser (grey geese and white geese) and Branta (black geese). Some members of the Tadorninae subfamily (e.g., Egyptian goose, Orinoco goose) are commonly called geese, but are not considered "true geese" taxonomically. More distantly related members of the family Anatidae are swans, most of which are larger than true geese, and ducks, which are smaller.

The term "goose" may refer to such bird of either sex, but when paired with "gander", "goose" refers specifically to a female one ("gander" referring to a male). Young birds before fledging are called goslings. The collective noun for a group of geese on the ground is a gaggle; when in flight, they are called a skein, a team, or a wedge; when flying close together, they are called a plump.

== Etymology ==
Live geese

The word "goose" is a direct descendant of Proto-Indo-European *ǵʰh₂éns. In Germanic languages, the root gave Old English gōs with the plural gēs and gandra (becoming Modern English goose, geese, gander, respectively), West Frisian goes, gies and guoske, Dutch: gans, ganzen, ganzerik, New High German Gans, Gänse, and Ganter, and Old Norse gás and gæslingr, whence English gosling.

This term also gave Lithuanian: žąsìs, Irish: gé (goose, from Old Irish: géiss), Sanskrit: हंस (haṃsa), Assamese: হাঁহ (hãh), Latin: anser, Spanish and Portuguese: ganso, Ancient Greek: χήν (khēn), Albanian: gatë (swans), Finnish: hanhi, Avestan: zāō, Polish: gęś, Romanian: gâscă / gânsac, Ukrainian: гуска / гусак (huska / husak), Russian: гусыня / гусь (gusyna / gus), Czech: husa, and Persian: غاز (ghāz).

== True geese and their relatives ==
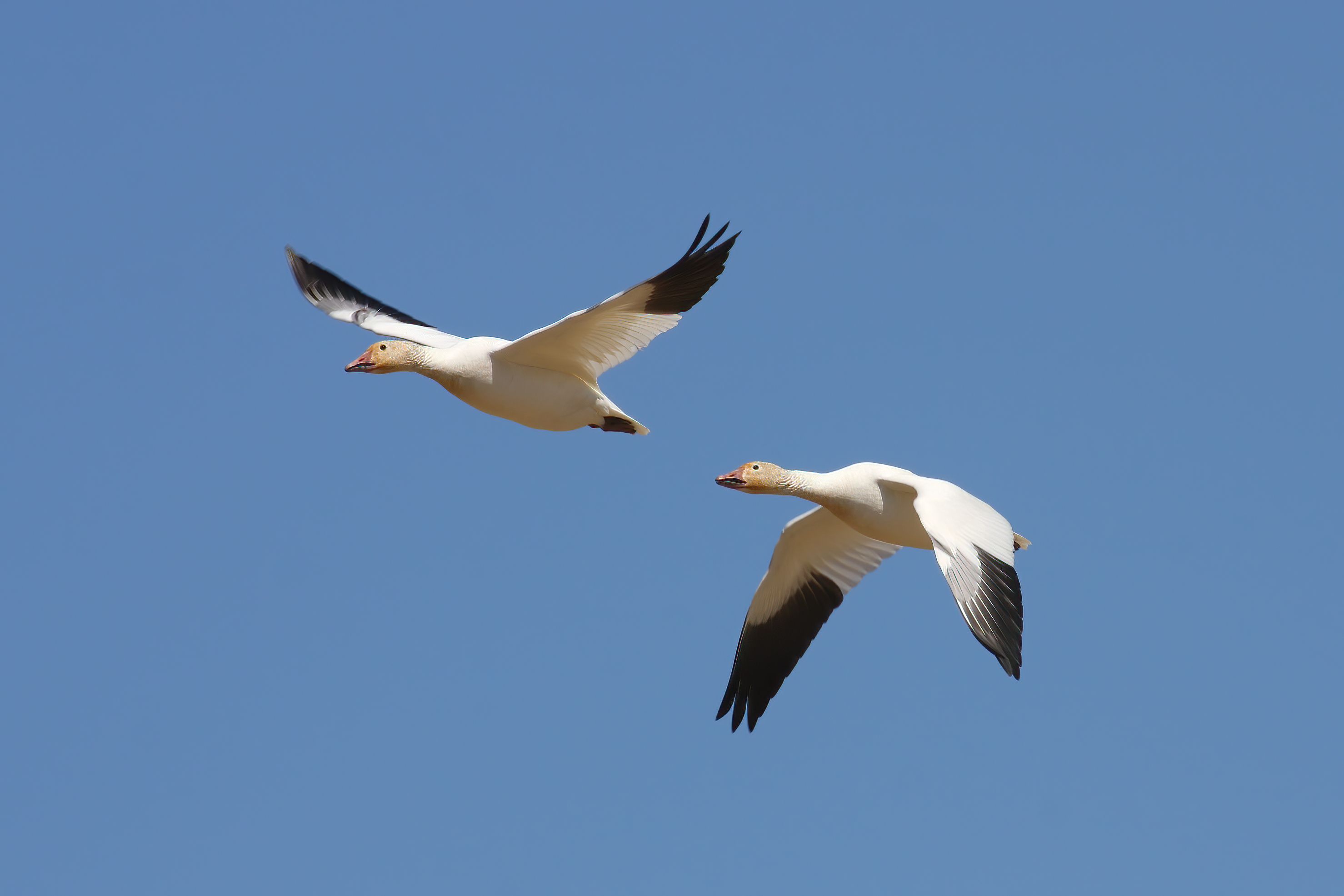
Snow geese (Anser caerulescens) in Quebec, Canada

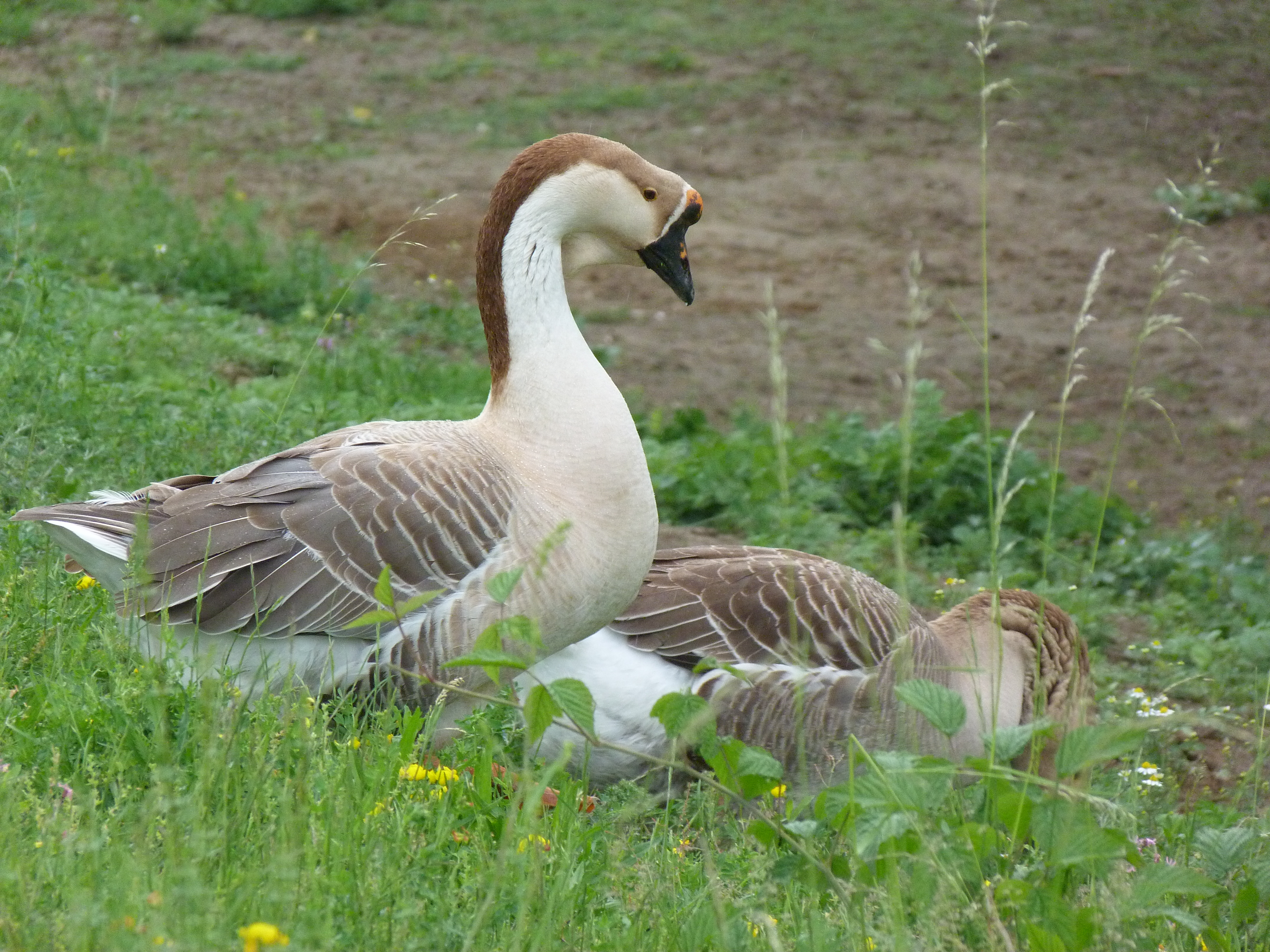
Chinese geese (Anser cygnoides domesticus), the domesticated form of the swan goose (Anser cygnoides)

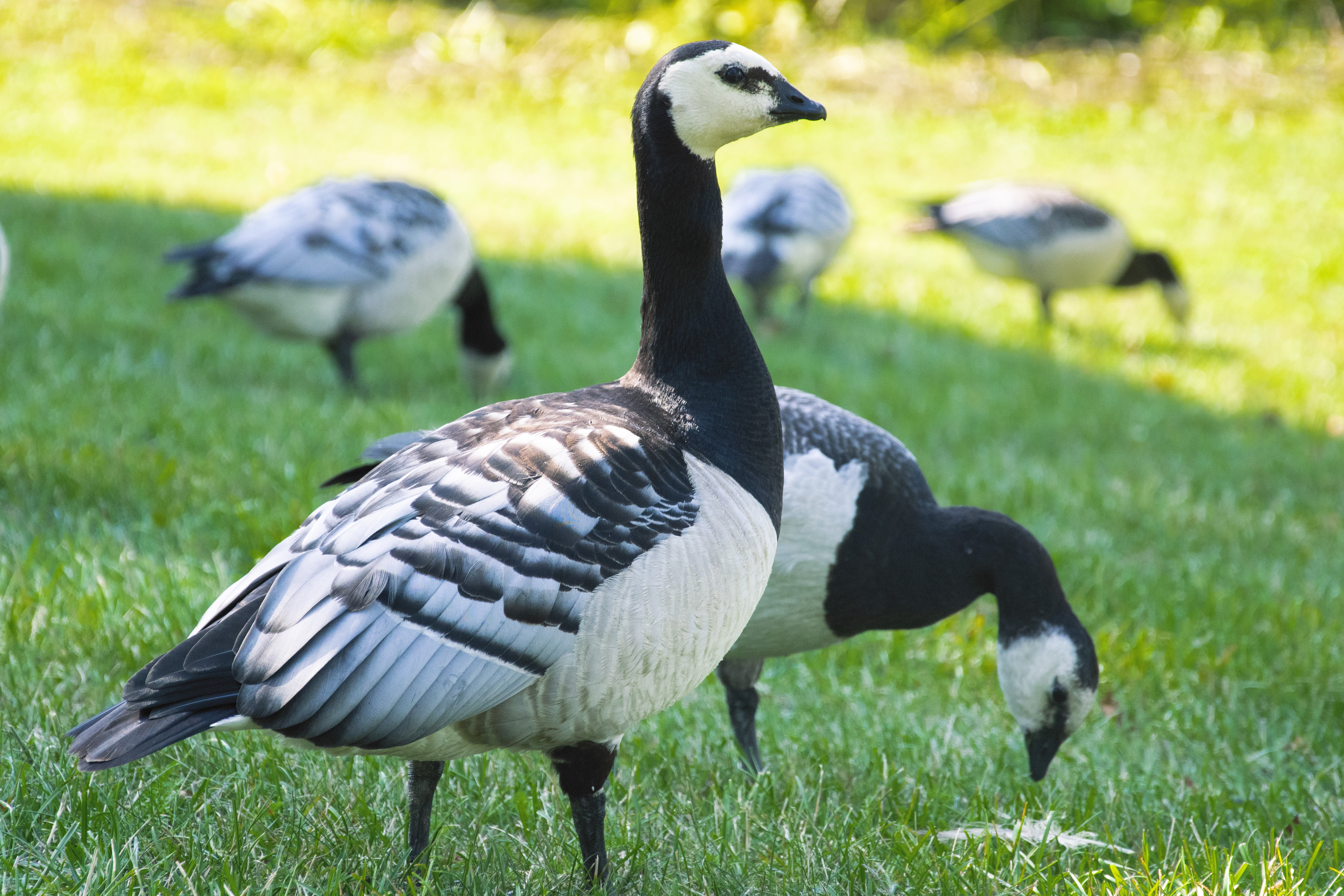
Barnacle geese (Branta leucopsis) in Naantali, Finland

The two living genera of true geese are: Anser, grey geese and white geese, such as the greylag goose and snow goose, and Branta, black geese, such as the Canada goose.

Two genera of geese are only tentatively placed in the Anserinae; they may belong to the shelducks or form a subfamily on their own: Cereopsis, the Cape Barren goose, and Cnemiornis, the prehistoric New Zealand goose. Either these or, more probably, the goose-like coscoroba swan is the closest living relative of the true geese.

Fossils of true geese are hard to assign to genus; all that can be said is that their fossil record, particularly in North America, is dense and comprehensively documents many different species of true geese that have been around since about 10 million years ago in the Miocene. The aptly named Anser atavus (meaning "progenitor goose") from some 12 million years ago had even more plesiomorphies in common with swans. In addition, some goose-like birds are known from subfossil remains found on the Hawaiian Islands.

Geese are monogamous, living in permanent pairs throughout the year; however, unlike most other permanently monogamous animals, they are territorial only during the short nesting season. Paired geese are more dominant and feed more, two factors that result in more young.

== Fossil record ==
Goose fossils have been found ranging from 10 to 12 million years ago (Middle Miocene). Garganornis ballmanni from Late Miocene (~ 6–9 Ma) of Gargano region of central Italy, stood one and a half meters tall and weighed about 22 kilograms. The evidence suggests the bird was flightless, unlike modern geese.

== Migratory patterns ==
Most goose species are migratory, though populations of Canada geese living near human developments may remain in a locality year-round. These 'resident' geese, found primarily in the eastern United States, may migrate only short distances, or not at all, if they have adequate food supply and access to open water.

=== Navigation ===
Migratory geese may use several environmental cues in timing the beginning of their migration, including temperature, predation threat, and food availability. Like all migratory birds, geese exhibit an ability to navigate using an internal compass, using a combination of innate and learned behaviors. The preferred direction of migration is heritable, and birds appear to orient themselves using Earth's magnetic field. Migrations occur over the course of several weeks, and up to 85% of migration time is spent at perennial stopover sites, where individuals rest and build up fat stores for further travel.

=== Formation ===
Geese, like other birds, fly in a V formation. This formation helps to conserve energy in flight, and aids in communication and monitoring of flock mates. Using great white pelicans as a model species, researchers showed that flying in a V formation increased the aerodynamics of trailing birds, thus requiring fewer wing flaps to stay aloft and lowering individuals' heartrates. Leading geese switch positions on longer flights to allow for multiple individuals to gain benefits from the less energy-intensive trailing positions; in family groups, parental birds almost always lead.

== Other birds called "geese" ==
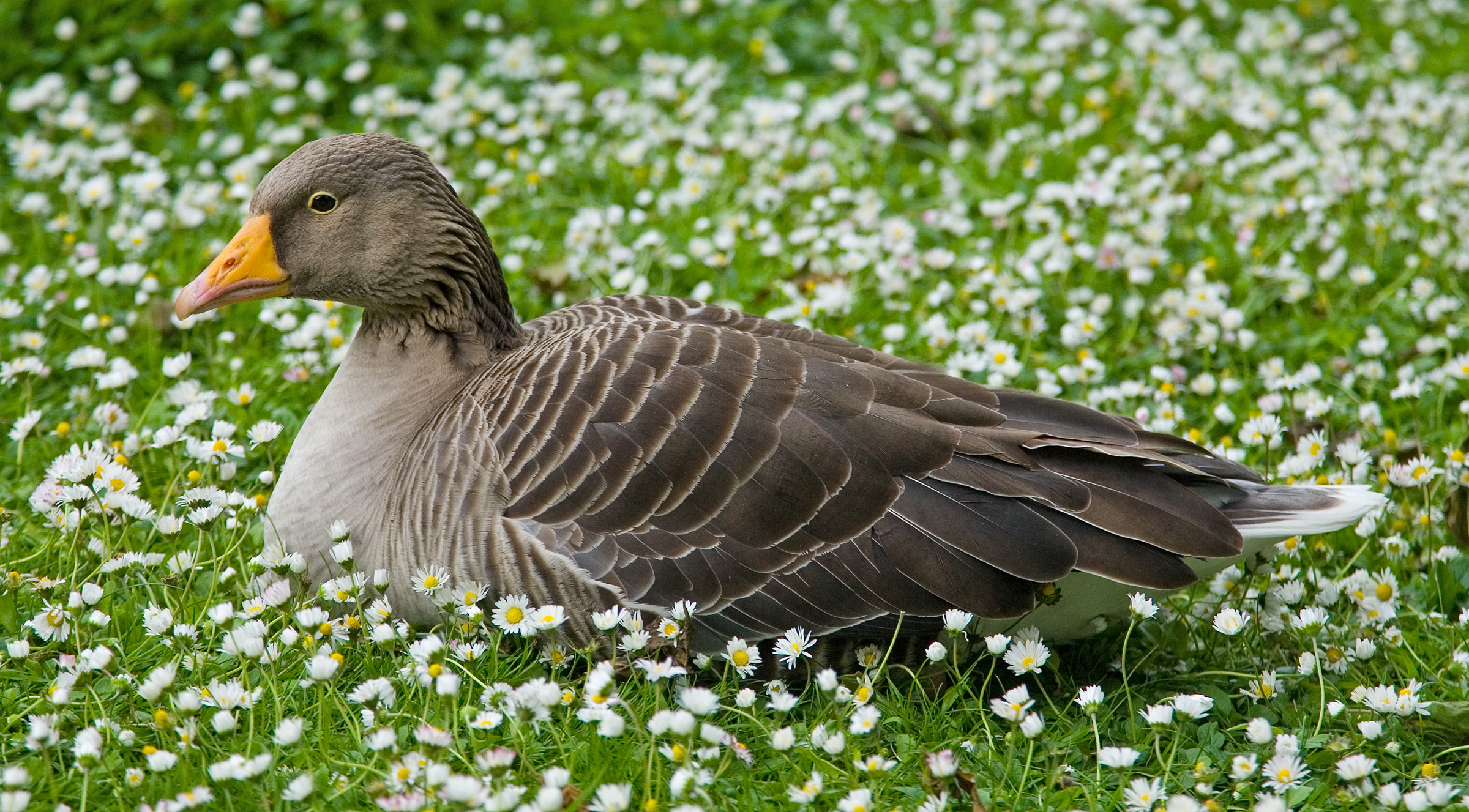
Greylag goose at St. James's Park, London, England

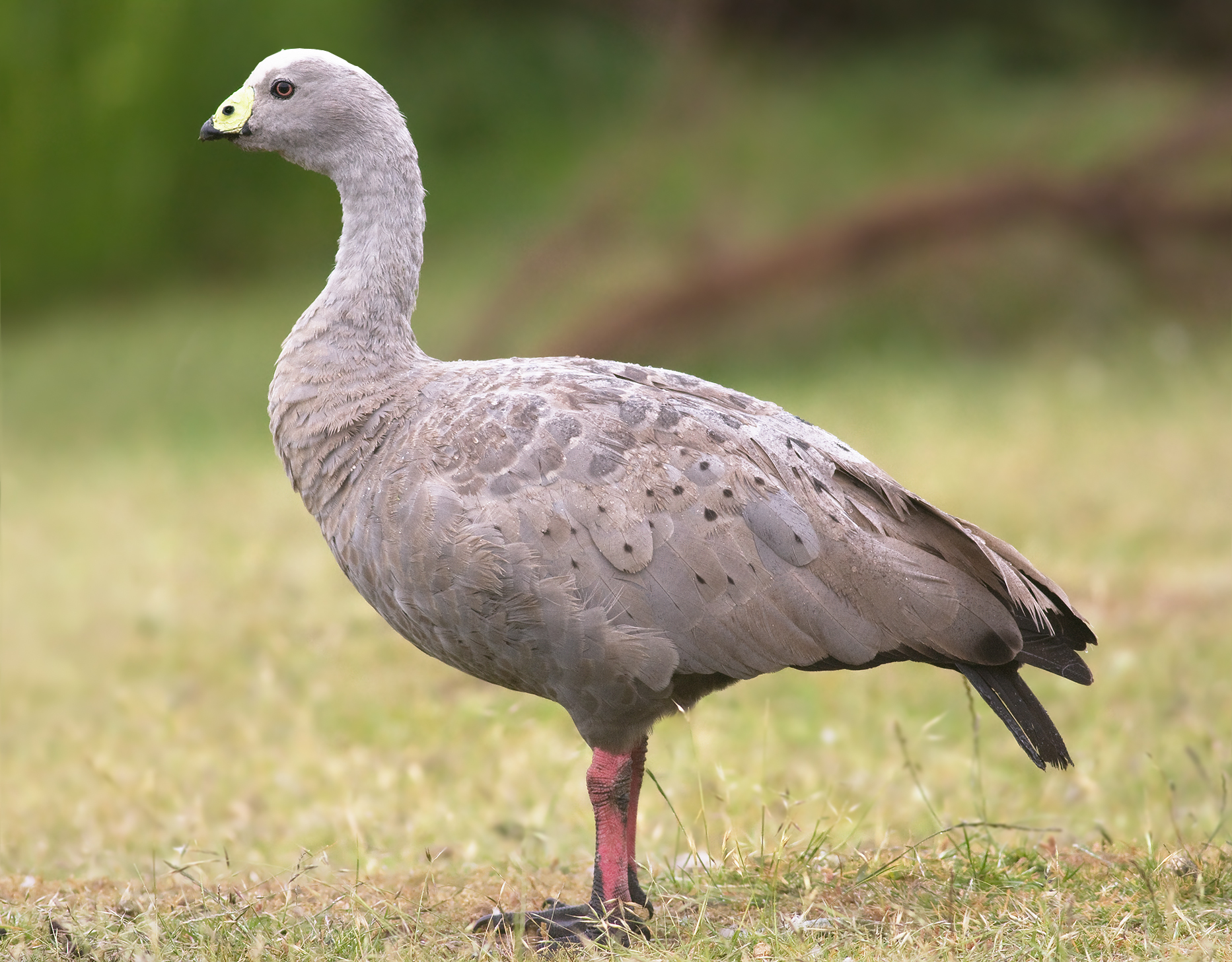
Cape Barren goose (Cereopsis novaehollandiae) in Maria Island, Australia

Some mainly Southern Hemisphere birds are called "geese", most of which belong to the shelduck subfamily Tadorninae. These are:

- The Orinoco goose (Neochen jubata)
- The Egyptian goose (Alopochen aegyptiaca)
- The South American sheldgeese in the genus Chloephaga
- The prehistoric Malagasy sheldgoose (Centrornis majori)

Others:

- The spur-winged goose (Plectropterus gambensis) is most closely related to the shelducks, but distinct enough to warrant its own subfamily, the Plectropterinae.
- The blue-winged goose (Cyanochen cyanopterus) and the Cape Barren goose (Cereopsis novaehollandiae) have disputed affinities. They belong to separate ancient lineages that may ally either to the Tadorninae, the Anserinae, or closer to the dabbling ducks (Anatinae).
- The three species of small waterfowl in the genus Nettapus named "pygmy geese"; they seem to represent another ancient lineage, with possible affinities to the Cape Barren goose or the spur-winged goose.
- The maned goose, also known as the maned duck or Australian wood duck (Chenonetta jubata)
- A genus of prehistorically extinct seaducks, Chendytes, is sometimes called the "diving-geese" due to their large size.
- The magpie goose (Anseranas semipalmata) is the only living species in the family Anseranatidae.
- The northern gannet (Morus bassanus), a seabird, is also known as the "solan goose", although it is unrelated to the true geese, or any other Anseriformes for that matter.

== In popular culture ==
=== Sayings and phrases that reference geese ===
- To "have a gander" is to look at something.
- "What's good sauce for the goose is good sauce for the gander" or "What's good for the goose is good for the gander" means that what is an appropriate treatment for one person is equally appropriate for someone else. This statement supporting equality is frequently used in the context of sex and gender, because a goose is female and a gander is male.
- Saying that someone's "goose is cooked" means that they are about to be punished.
- The common phrase "silly goose" is used when referring to someone who is acting particularly silly.
- "Killing the goose that lays the golden eggs", derived from Aesop's Fables, is a saying referring to a greed-motivated action that destroys or otherwise renders useless a favourable situation that would have provided benefits over time.
- "A wild goose chase" is a useless, futile waste of time and effort. It is derived from a 16th-century horse racing event.
- A raised, rounded area of swelling (typically a hematoma) caused by an impact injury is sometimes metaphorically called a "goose egg", especially if it occurs on the head. Alternatively, "goose egg" can refer to the number zero, especially when indicating a final total or result.

=== Geese as characters in cultural works ===
- Mother Goose is a fictitious children's storybook author associated with several collections of fairy tales and nursery rhymes translated into English during the 18th century.
- Gänsewein (German, lit. 'Goose wine') is a playful term for plain drinking water, first documented the Podagrammisch Trostbüchlein by Johann Fischart (1577).
- Popular indie game Untitled Goose Game released in 2019 chronicles the activities of an ornery goose in an English village.
- In the late 18th century poem, The Goose and the Common, geese serve to illustrate the social and economic issues cased by the enclosure of common land.

=== In religion ===
In Celtic Christianity, the wild goose is used as an image of the Holy Spirit, "because of its ability to disturb and surprise". The image contrasts with the gentleness and peacefulness invoked by the dove, another bird used to characterize the Holy Spirit.

=== "Gray Goose Laws" in Iceland ===
The oldest collection of Medieval Icelandic laws is known as "Grágás"; i.e., the Gray Goose Laws. Various etymologies were offered for that name:

- The fact that the laws were written with a goose quill;
- The fact that the laws were bound in goose skin;
- Because of the age of the laws—it was then believed that geese lived longer than other birds.

== Gallery ==
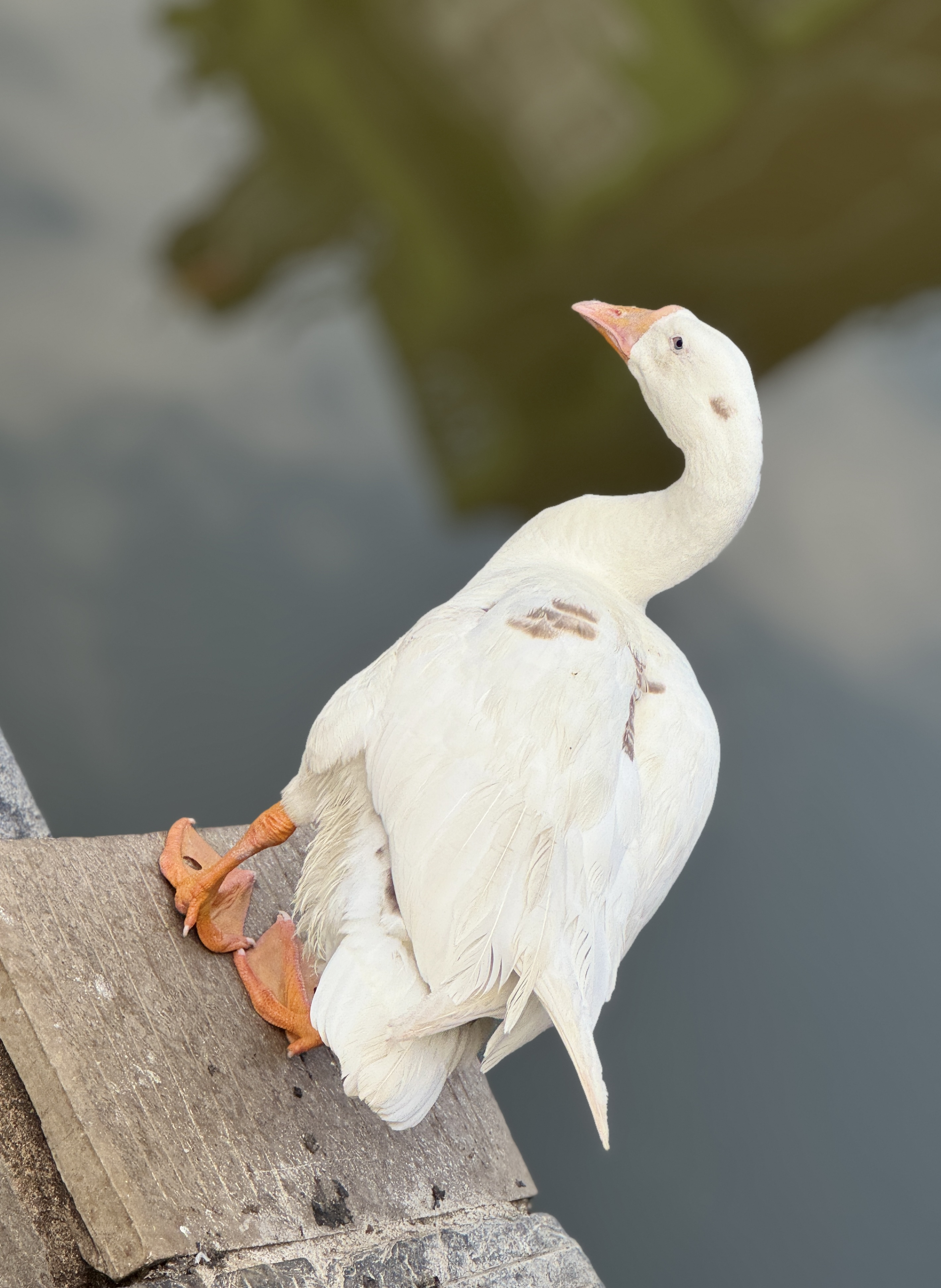
A domestic goose standing on a concrete platform at Kamalpokhari, Nepal.

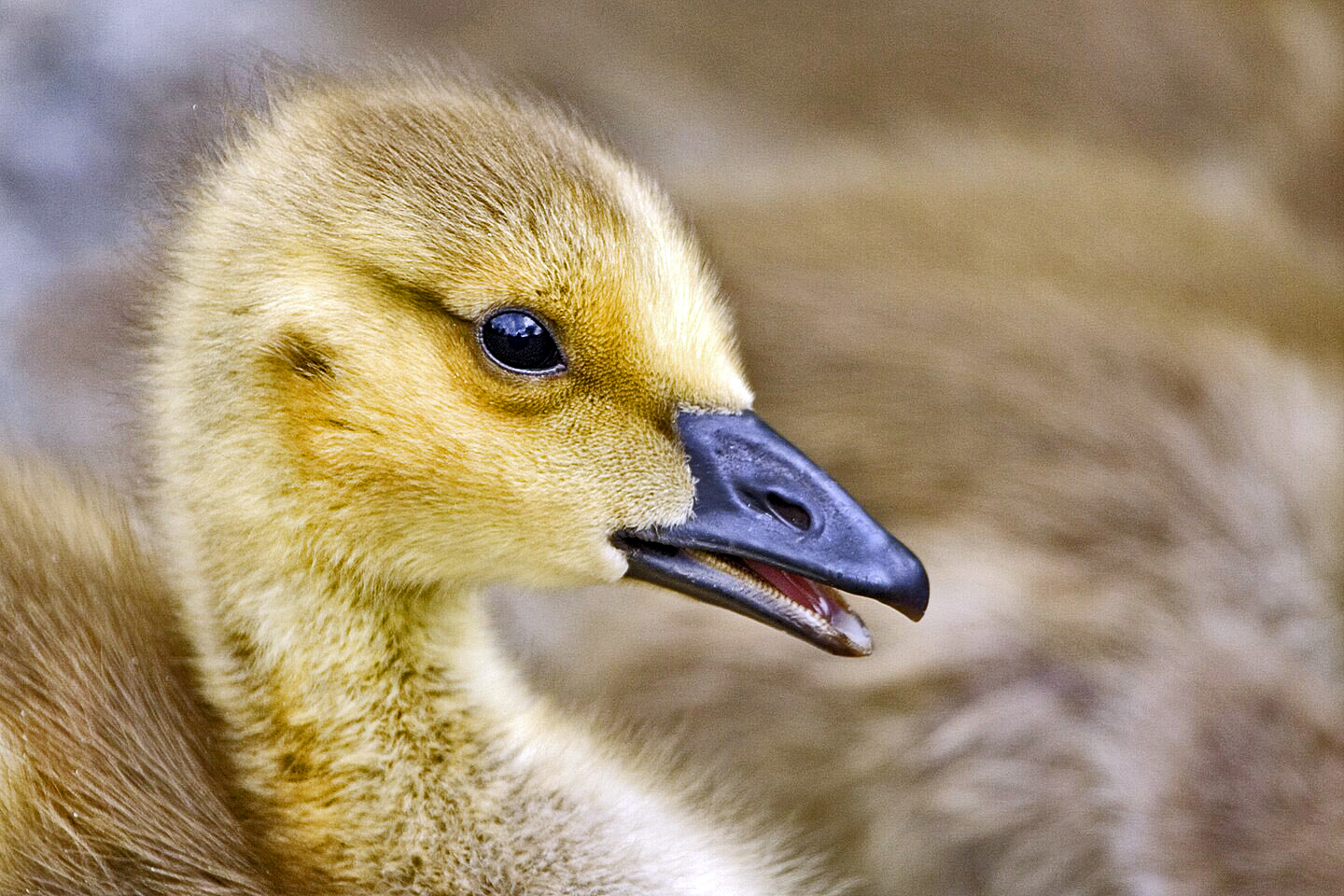
Canada goose gosling

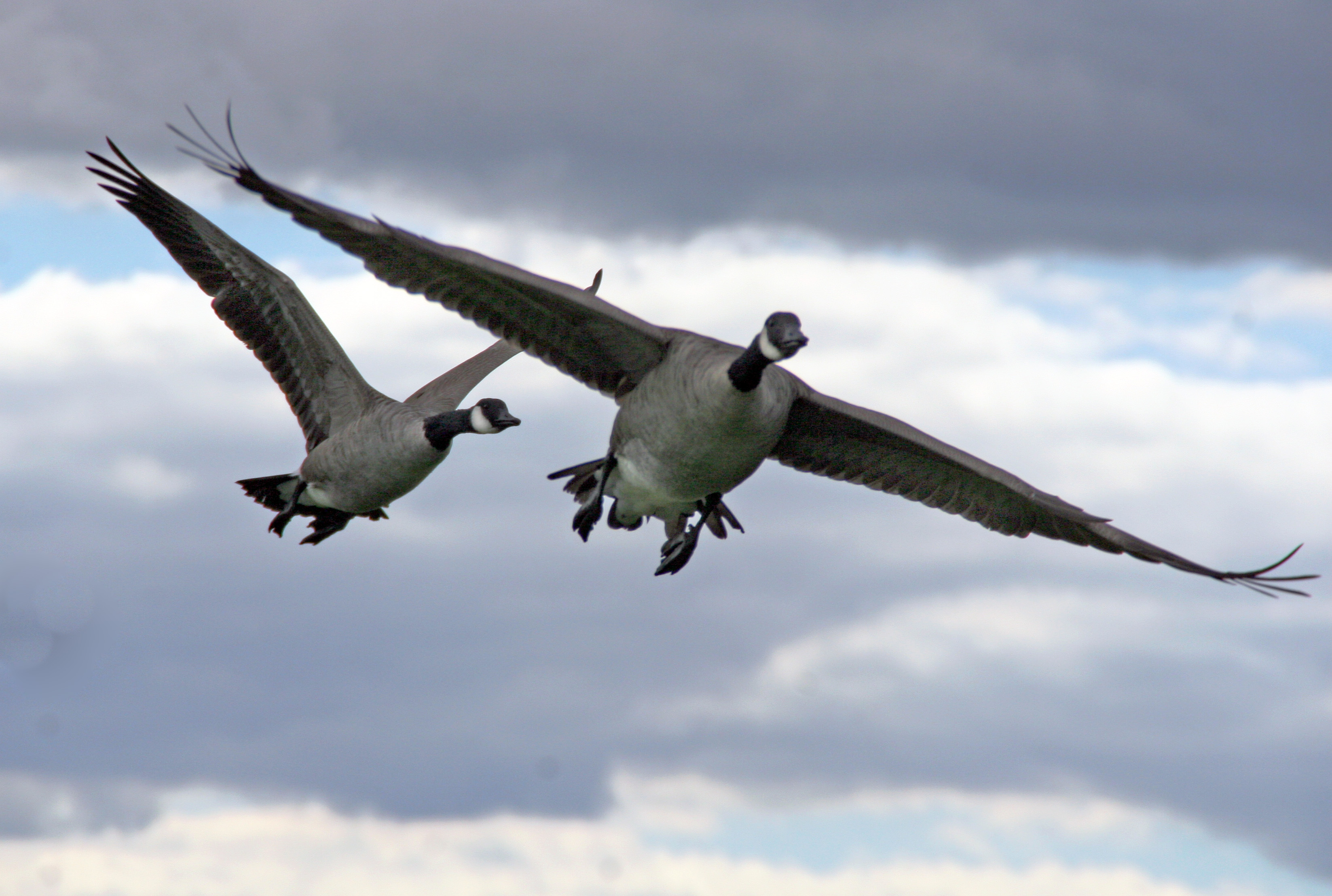
Canada geese in flight, Great Meadows Wildlife Sanctuary

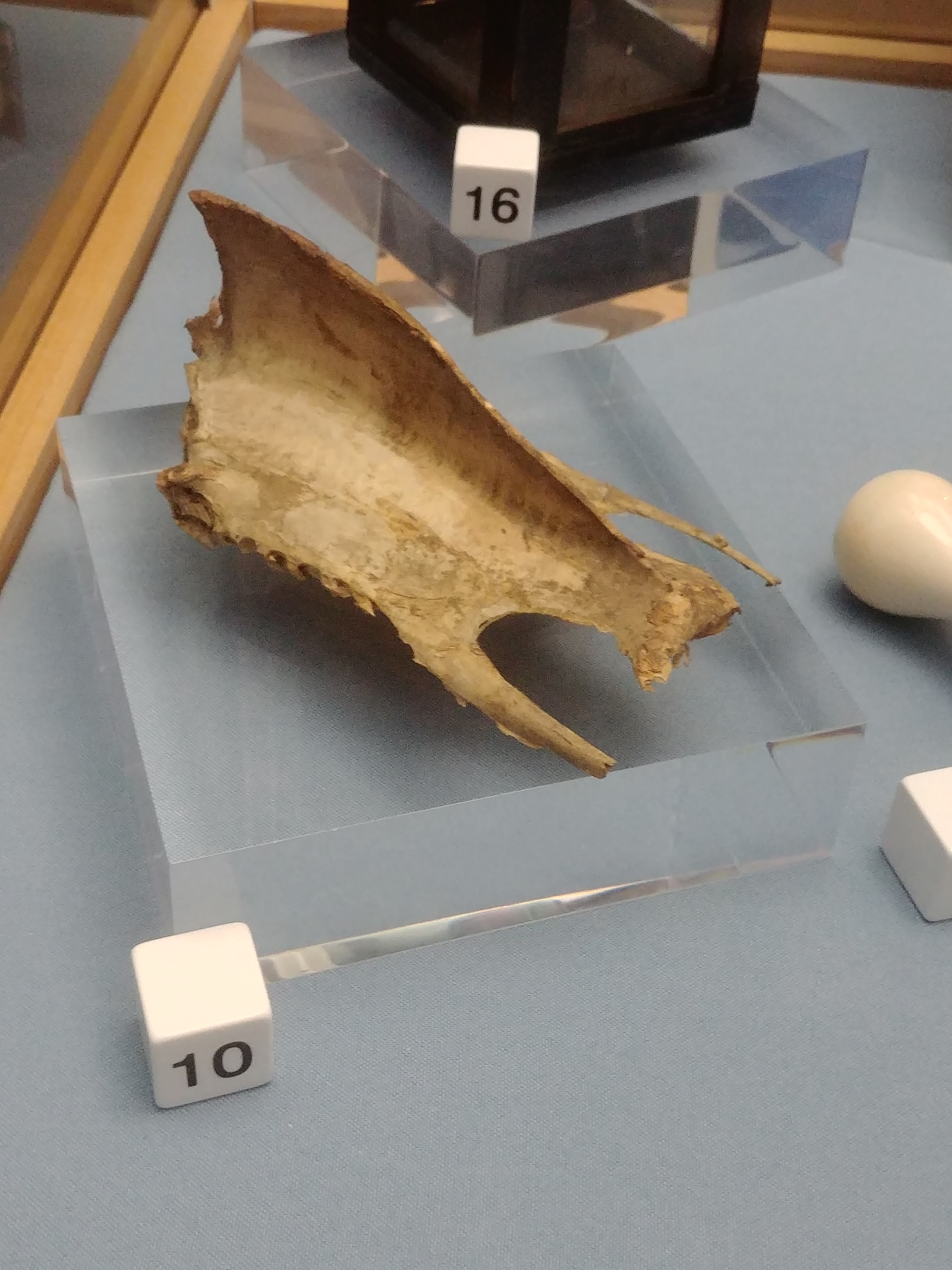
Goose breastbone, the colour of the bones after cooking was used to predict how cold winter would be in Lincolnshire folkloric traditions (North Lincolnshire Museum)

== See also ==
Three flying geese in the coat of arms of Polvijärvi

- Angel wing, a disease common in geese
- Domestic goose, which includes cooking and folklore
- Flying geese paradigm
- List of Anseriformes by population
- List of goose breeds
- Roast goose
- Waterfowl
- Wildfowl
- Untitled Goose Game, a 2019 video game centering around a goose that takes place in a middle-class village in England.
