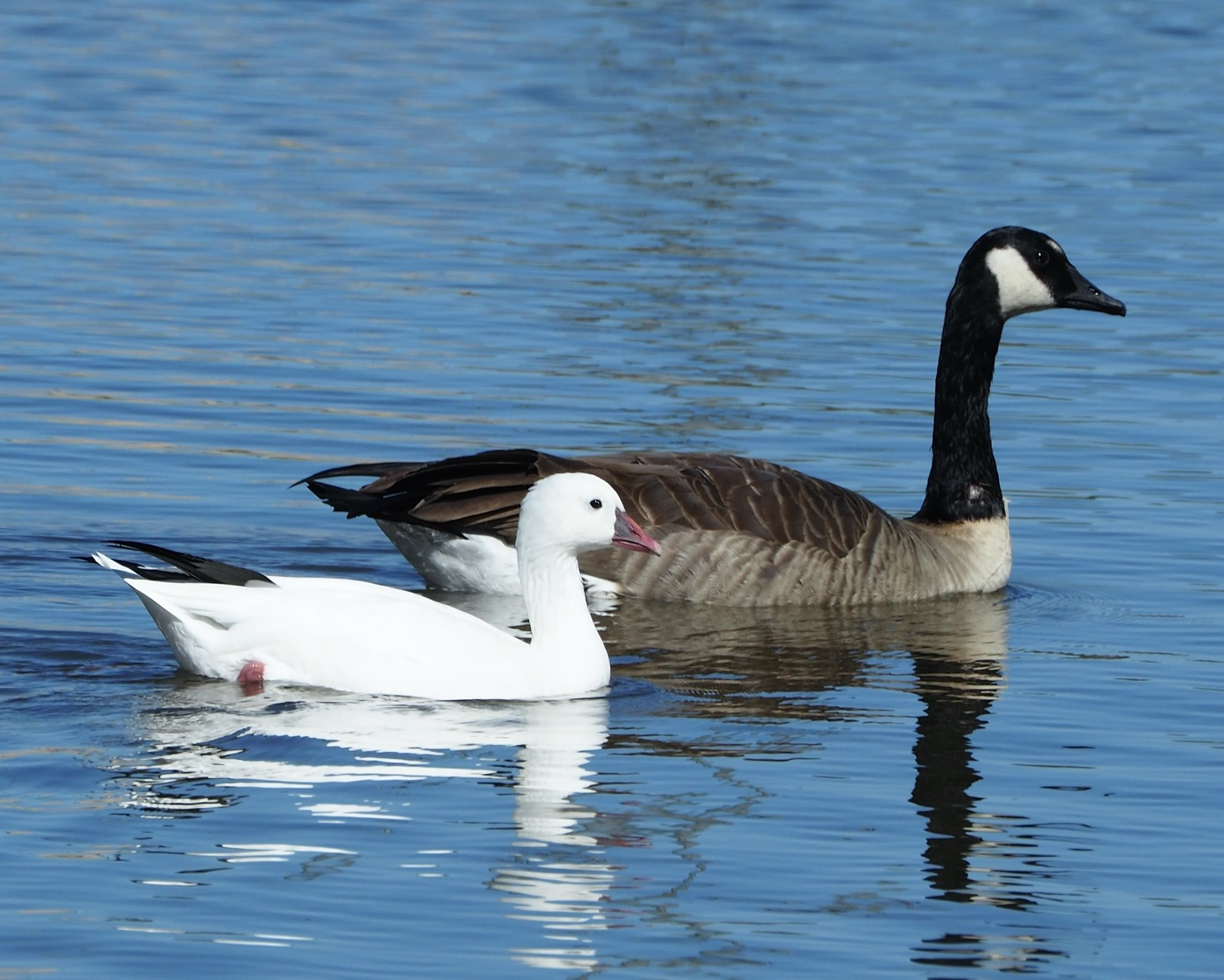
- Ross's goose (Anser rossii) with Canada goose (Branta canadensis)

Scientific classification
- Kingdom: Animalia
- Phylum: Chordata
- Class: Aves
- Order: Anseriformes
- Family: Anatidae
- Subfamily: Anserinae; Vigors, 1825

Genera
- See text

Synonyms
- Cygninae

= Anserinae =

Anserinae Temporal range: Middle Miocene to present

Subfamily of birds

The Anserinae are a subfamily in the waterfowl family Anatidae and includes the swan and geese. Under alternative systematical concepts (see e.g., Terres & NAS, 1991), it is split into two subfamilies. The Anserinae contains geese and ducks, while the Cygninae contains the swans.

== Systematics ==
Swans (Tribe Cygnini)

- Genus Cygnus – true swans: The black-and-yellow-billed swans are sometimes separated in the genus Olor.
- Genus †Afrocygnus (Miocene of North Africa)
- Genus †Annakacygna – short-winged swans (Miocene of Japan)
- Genus †Megalodytes (Miocene of California)

True geese (Tribe Anserini)

- Genus Anser – grey and white geese
- Genus Branta – black geese (including †B. rhuax, formerly placed in Geochen)

Unresolved

- Genus Coscoroba – coscoroba swan

These two genera are distinct from other geese and often elevated to a subfamily of their own (Cereopsinae), or alternatively into the shelduck subfamily Tadorninae:

Tribe Cereopseini

- Genus Cereopsis – Cape Barren goose
- Genus †Cnemiornis – New Zealand geese (prehistoric)

Some enigmatic subfossils of very large goose-like birds from the Hawaiian Islands do not appear to be moa-nalos (goose-sized dabbling ducks) or B. rhuax. They cannot be assigned to any genus living today, though both may be fairly close to Branta:

- Very large Hawaiʻian goose, ?Branta sp.
- Giant Oʻahu goose, Anatidae sp. et gen. indet.
