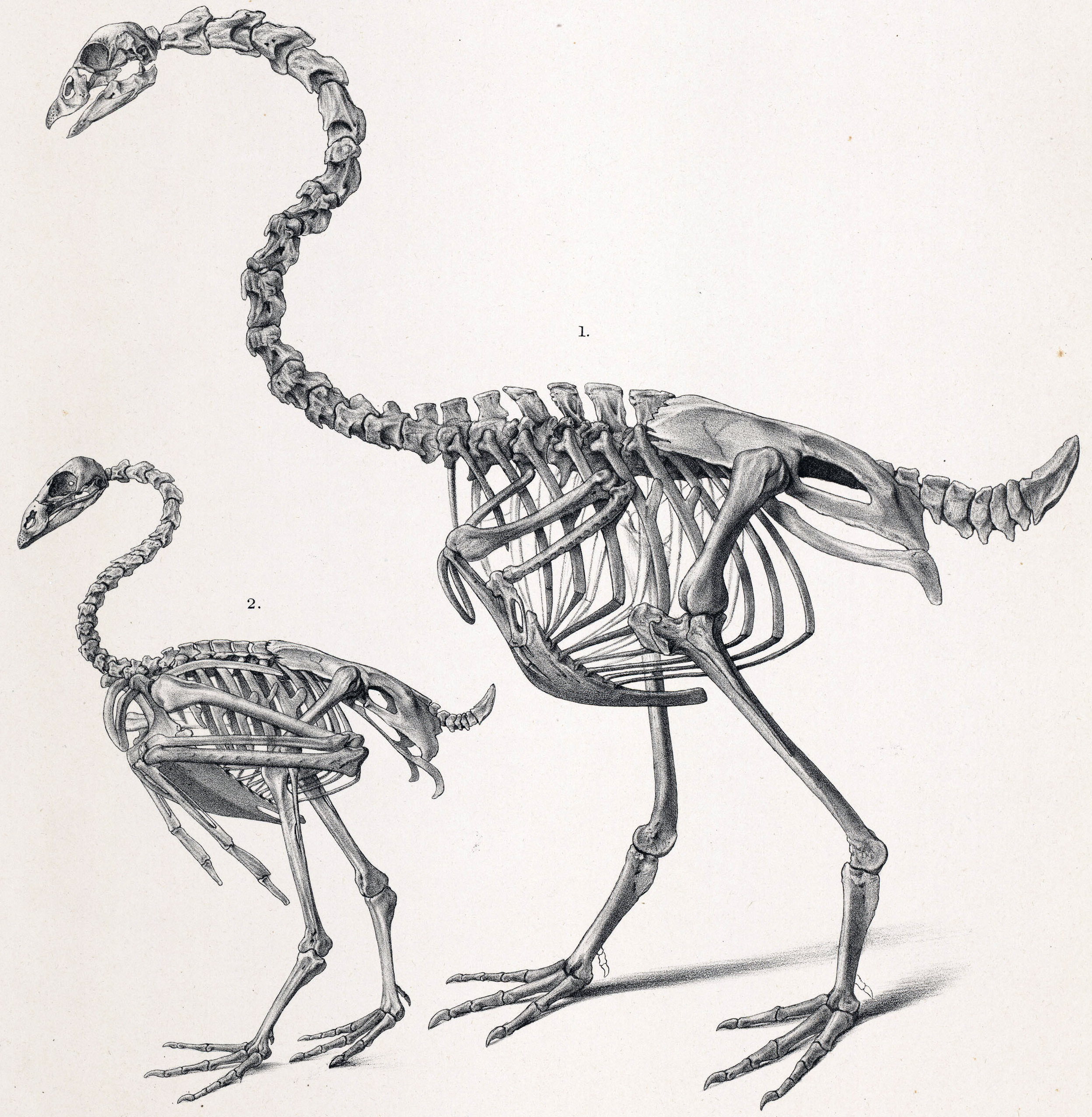
- Skeletons of the South Island goose (right) and Cape Barren goose (left)

Conservation status
- Extinct (NZ TCS)(C. gracilis)

- Extinct (NZ TCS)(C. calcitrans)

Scientific classification
- Kingdom: Animalia
- Phylum: Chordata
- Class: Aves
- Order: Anseriformes
- Family: Anatidae
- Subfamily: Anserinae
- Genus: †Cnemiornis; Owen 1866

Species
- C. gracilis; C. calcitrans

= New Zealand goose =

New Zealand geese Temporal range: Otiran-Holocene

Extinct genus of birds

The extinct New Zealand geese are a genus, Cnemiornis, of very large flightless geese in the family Anatidae. The genus, endemic to New Zealand, consists of two species: the North Island goose (Cnemiornis gracilis) and the South Island goose (Cnemiornis calcitrans).

== Description ==
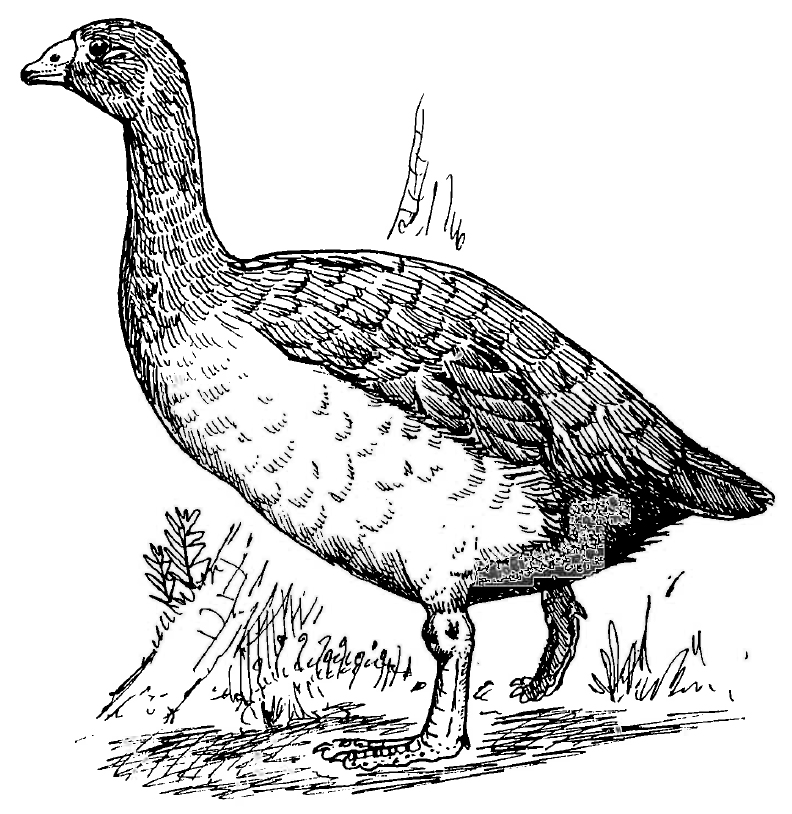
Life restoration of C. calcitrans

This goose was as large as some small moa. The North Island species had 15 kg (33 lb) in body mass while the South Island species reached 18 kg (40 lb), far surpassing Canada and Cape barren geese. They were flightless, with much-reduced webbing on the feet, an adaptation for terrestrial dwelling similar to that of the nene of Hawaii. They are usually considered most closely related to the Cape Barren goose of Australia.

== Extinction ==
They were never particularly common, and like many other large New Zealand endemic species they were subject to hunting pressures from the settling Polynesians, as well as predation upon their eggs and hatchlings by kiore, or the Polynesian rat (which accompanied the settlers) and the settlers' dogs, and were extinct before the arrival of European settlers. The Māori name of the North Island goose (C. gracilis) was "tarepo".
