= List of cultural properties of Japan – paintings (Gunma) =

This list is of the cultural properties of Japan designated in the category of paintings (絵画, kaiga) for the Prefecture of Gunma.

== National Cultural Properties ==
As of 1 May 2015, five Important Cultural Properties have been designated, being of national significance.

Property	Date	Municipality	Ownership	Comments	Image	Dimensions	Coordinates	Ref.
Arhat, colour on silk, by Kin Taiju 絹本著色羅漢像〈金大受筆／〉 kenpon chakushoku rakan zō (Kin Taiju hitsu)	Southern Song	Takasaki	The Museum of Modern Art, Gunma				36°17′55″N 139°04′43″E	
Shaka Coming Forth from the Mountains, colour on silk 絹本墨画出山釈迦図 kenpon chakushoku shussan Shaka zu	Nanboku-chō period	Takasaki	Chōraku-ji (長楽寺) (kept at Gunma Prefectural Museum of History)			73 centimetres (29 in) by 36 centimetres (14 in)	36°17′55″N 139°04′46″E	
Western Kings, colour on paper 紙本著色泰西王侯図 shihon chakushoku taisei ōkō zu	Momoyama period	Takasaki	Manpuku-ji (満福寺) (kept at Gunma Prefectural Museum of History)	pair of scrolls			36°17′55″N 139°04′46″E	
Miracles of Jizō Bosatsu, colour on paper 紙本著色地蔵菩薩霊験記 shihon chakushoku Jizō bosatsu reigenki	Nanboku-chō period	Tokyo	Myōgi Jinja (妙義神社) (kept at Tokyo National Museum)				35°43′08″N 139°46′36″E	
Landscape, ink on paper 紙本墨画山水図 shihon bokuga sansui zu	Muromachi period	Takasaki	The Museum of Modern Art, Gunma	pair of scrolls			36°17′55″N 139°04′43″E	

== Prefectural Cultural Properties ==
As of 24 March 2015, thirty-seven properties have been designated at a prefectural level.

Property	Date	Municipality	Ownership	Comments	Image	Dimensions	Coordinates	Ref.
Egara Tenjin, colour on silk 絹本著色 荏柄天神像 kenpon chakushoku Egara Tenjin zō	Nanboku-chō period	Takasaki	Chōraku-ji (長楽寺) (kept at Gunma Prefectural Museum of History)			90 centimetres (35 in) by 54.2 centimetres (21.3 in)	36°17′55″N 139°04′46″E	
Lü Dongbin, ink and light colour on silk 絹本墨画淡彩 呂洞賓図 kenpon bokuga tansai Ryo Dōhin zu	Ming dynasty	Takasaki	Chōraku-ji (長楽寺) (kept at Gunma Prefectural Museum of History)			135.9 centimetres (53.5 in) by 78.9 centimetres (31.1 in)	36°17′55″N 139°04′46″E	
Sannō Mandala, colour on silk 絹本著色 山王曼荼羅図 kenpon chakushoku Sannō mandara zu	Nanboku-chō period	Takasaki	Chōraku-ji (長楽寺) (kept at Gunma Prefectural Museum of History)			132.8 centimetres (52.3 in) by 52.2 centimetres (20.6 in)	36°17′55″N 139°04′46″E	
Jikaku Daishi, colour on silk 絹本著色 慈覚大師像 kenpon chakushoku Jikaku Daishi zō	Nanboku-chō period	Takasaki	Chōraku-ji (長楽寺) (kept at Gunma Prefectural Museum of History)			83.2 centimetres (32.8 in) by 38.1 centimetres (15.0 in)	36°17′55″N 139°04′46″E	
Wuzhun Shifan, colour on silk 絹本著色 無準師範像 kenpon chakushoku Bujun Shiban zō	Nanboku-chō period	Takasaki	Chōraku-ji (長楽寺) (kept at Gunma Prefectural Museum of History)			103.3 centimetres (40.7 in) by 59.3 centimetres (23.3 in)	36°17′55″N 139°04′46″E	
Bokuō Ryōichi, colour on silk 絹本著色 牧翁了一像 kenpon chakushoku Bokuō Ryōichi zō	Nanboku-chō period	Takasaki	Chōraku-ji (長楽寺) (kept at Gunma Prefectural Museum of History)			83.1 centimetres (32.7 in) by 38.4 centimetres (15.1 in)	36°17′55″N 139°04′46″E	
Ritsudai Eisō, colour on silk 絹本著色 律台栄宗像 kenpon chakushoku Ritsudai Eisō zō	Nanboku-chō period	Takasaki	Chōraku-ji (長楽寺) (kept at Ōta City Nittanoshō History Museum (太田市立新田荘歴史資料館))			64.8 centimetres (25.5 in) by 36.5 centimetres (14.4 in)	36°15′39″N 139°16′29″E	
Grapes, ink on silk, attributed to Nikan 絹本墨画 葡萄図(伝日観筆) kenpon bokuga budō zu (den-Nikan hitsu)	late Song/early Yuan	Takasaki	Chōraku-ji (長楽寺) (kept at Gunma Prefectural Museum of History)	pair of scrolls		120.1 centimetres (47.3 in) by 51.1 centimetres (20.1 in)	36°17′55″N 139°04′46″E	
Withered tree, ink on silk 絹本墨画 枯木図 kenpon bokuga kare-ki zu	Yuan	Takasaki	Chōraku-ji (長楽寺) (kept at Gunma Prefectural Museum of History)			120.1 centimetres (47.3 in) by 51.1 centimetres (20.1 in)	36°17′55″N 139°04′46″E	
Orchid, by Sessō, ink on silk 絹本墨画 蘭図(雪窓筆) kenpon bokuga ran zu (Sessō hitsu)	Yuan	Takasaki	Chōraku-ji (長楽寺) (kept at Gunma Prefectural Museum of History)			125.4 centimetres (49.4 in) by 35.5 centimetres (14.0 in)	36°17′55″N 139°04′46″E	
Kannon, by Chō Gekko, ink on silk 絹本墨画 月湖観音像 kenpon bokuga Gekko Kannon zō	Yuan	Takasaki	Chōraku-ji (長楽寺) (kept at Gunma Prefectural Museum of History)			103 centimetres (41 in) by 43.6 centimetres (17.2 in)	36°17′55″N 139°04′46″E	
Sixteen Arhats, colour on silk 絹本著色 十六羅漢図 kenpon chakushoku jūroku rakan zu	Kamakura period	Takasaki	Chōraku-ji (長楽寺) (kept at Gunma Prefectural Museum of History)	16 scrolls		87.6 centimetres (34.5 in) by 40.2 centimetres (15.8 in)	36°17′55″N 139°04′46″E	
Yanagi-Bashi Water Wheel, six-panel byōbu 柳橋水車図屏風 六曲一隻 ryūkyō suisha zu byōbu rokkyoku isseki	Momoyama/early Edo period	Takasaki	The Museum of Modern Art, Gunma			144.5 centimetres (4 ft 8.9 in) by 325.2 centimetres (10 ft 8.0 in)	36°17′55″N 139°04′43″E	

== See also ==
- Cultural Properties of Japan
- List of National Treasures of Japan (paintings)
- Japanese painting
- List of Cultural Properties of Japan - historical materials (Gunma)
