= Shima Kakoku =

Japanese photographer and artist

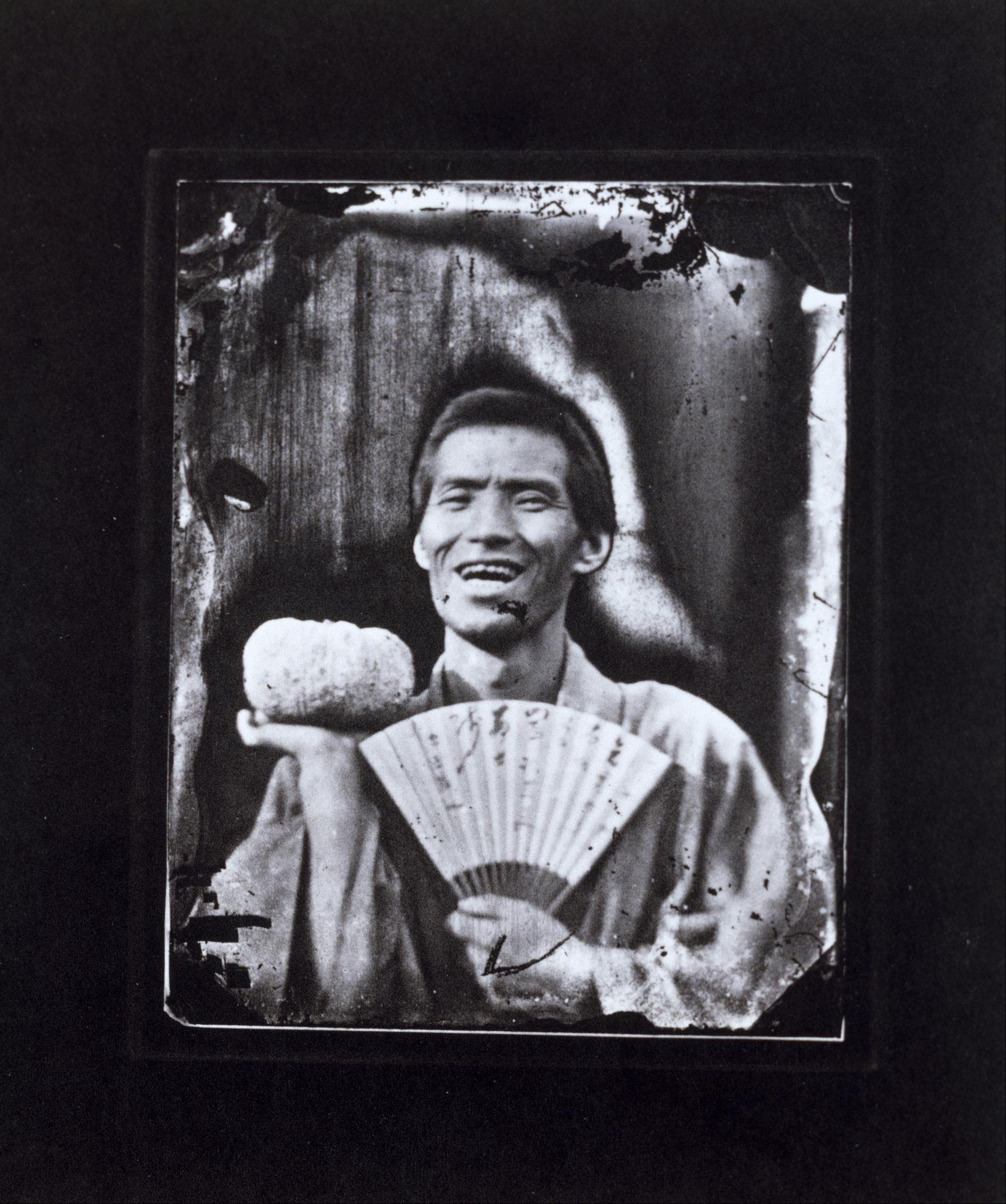
Self-portrait of Shima Kakoku (1870)

Shima Kakoku (島 霞谷; 1827–1870) was a pioneering Japanese photographer and artist. He was born in modern-day Tochigi Prefecture.

== Early life ==
Possibly inspired by his father, who was an avid painter, in 1847 he entered an art school in Edo (now Tokyo) where he met Ryū (surname unknown; 1823–1900), a fellow student. The two married in 1855 and soon began moving about the Kantō region, possibly exhibiting their works along the way.

== Photography career ==
At this time Shima seems to have had some pictures published as book illustrations.

At some point the couple learned photography, and in the spring of 1864 Ryu photographed Kakoku, thereby creating the earliest known photograph by a Japanese woman. A wet-plate print of this portrait remains in the Shima family archives.

The Shimas operated a photographic studio in Edo in about 1865 to 1867, until Kakoku accepted a teaching position at Kaiseijo.

Later, Shima worked at Daigaku Tōkō (大学東校, the predecessor of the School of Medicine, University of Tokyo), and while there invented the first Japanese movable type, for the printing of medical textbooks.

Shima Kakoku died in 1870, and his wife returned to Kiryū where she opened her own photographic studio.
