= Gunma Prefectural Museum of History =

- 群馬県立歴史博物館

General information
- Location: 992-1 Watanuki-machi, Takasaki, Gunma Prefecture, Japan
- Coordinates: 36°17′55″N 139°04′46″E
- Opened: 1979

Website
- Official website

Gunma Prefectural Museum of History (群馬県立歴史博物館, Gunma kenritsu rekishi hakubutsukan) opened in Takasaki, Gunma Prefecture, Japan, in 1979.

== See also ==
- List of Historic Sites of Japan (Gunma)
- The Museum of Modern Art, Gunma
- List of Cultural Properties of Japan - paintings (Gunma)
- List of National Treasures of Japan (archaeological materials)
