= Shima Ryū =

Japanese photographer (1823–1900)

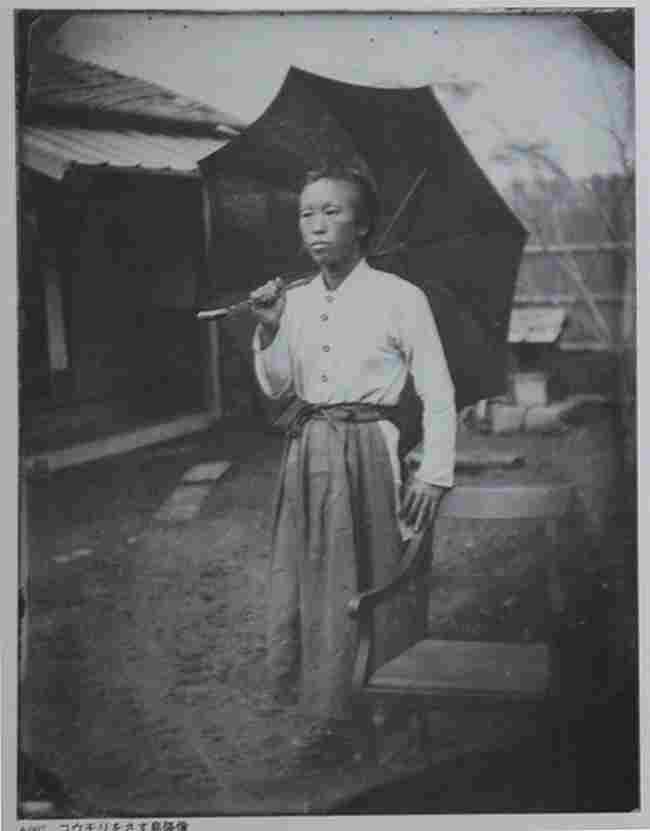
- Born: 1823
- Died: 1900 (aged 76–77)
- Known for: Photography
- Spouse: Shima Kakoku (m. 1855)

Shima Ryū (島 隆; 1823–1900) was a Japanese artist and pioneering photographer.

== Early life ==
Originally from Kiryū, in what is now Gunma Prefecture, Ryū studied at an art school in Edo (now Tokyo) where she met Shima Kakoku (1827–1870), a fellow student. The two married in 1855 and soon began moving about the Kantō region, possibly exhibiting their works along the way.

== Photography career ==
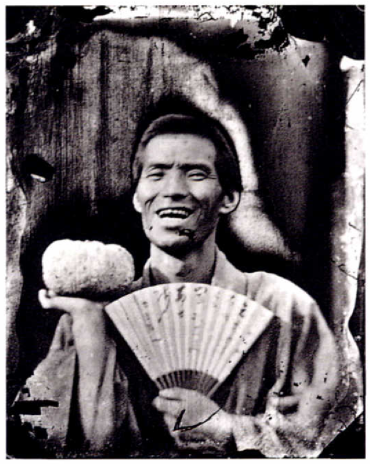
A wet plate photograph of Shima Kakoku by his wife, Shima Ryū in 1864. This is believed to be the first photograph taken by a Japanese woman.

At some point the couple learned photography, and in the spring of 1864 Ryū photographed her husband, thereby creating the earliest known photograph by a Japanese woman.

The negative is on deposit at the Tojo Historical Museum, a wet-plate print of this portrait remains in the Shima family archives and the Museum of Fine Arts in Houston has an albumen print.

The Shimas operated a photographic studio in Edo in about 1865 to 1867, until Kakoku accepted a teaching position at Kaiseijo. Following her husband's death in 1870, Ryū returned to Kiryū where she opened her own studio. She died in 1900.
