= Megalodytes =

Megalodytes Temporal range: Miocene, 15.97–7.246 Ma

Scientific classification
- Kingdom: Animalia
- Phylum: Chordata
- Class: Aves
- Order: Anseriformes
- Family: Anatidae
- Genus: †Megalodytes; Howard, 1992

Extinct genus of birds

Megalodytes is an extinct genus of waterfowl. The only known species, M. morejohni, is known from fragmentary wingbones found in Middle Miocene-aged marine strata of Kern County, California. Other specimens from similarly aged material from Japan originally referred to Megalodytes is now referred to the genus Annakacygna.
