= Gunma Museum of Natural History =

- 群馬県立自然史博物館
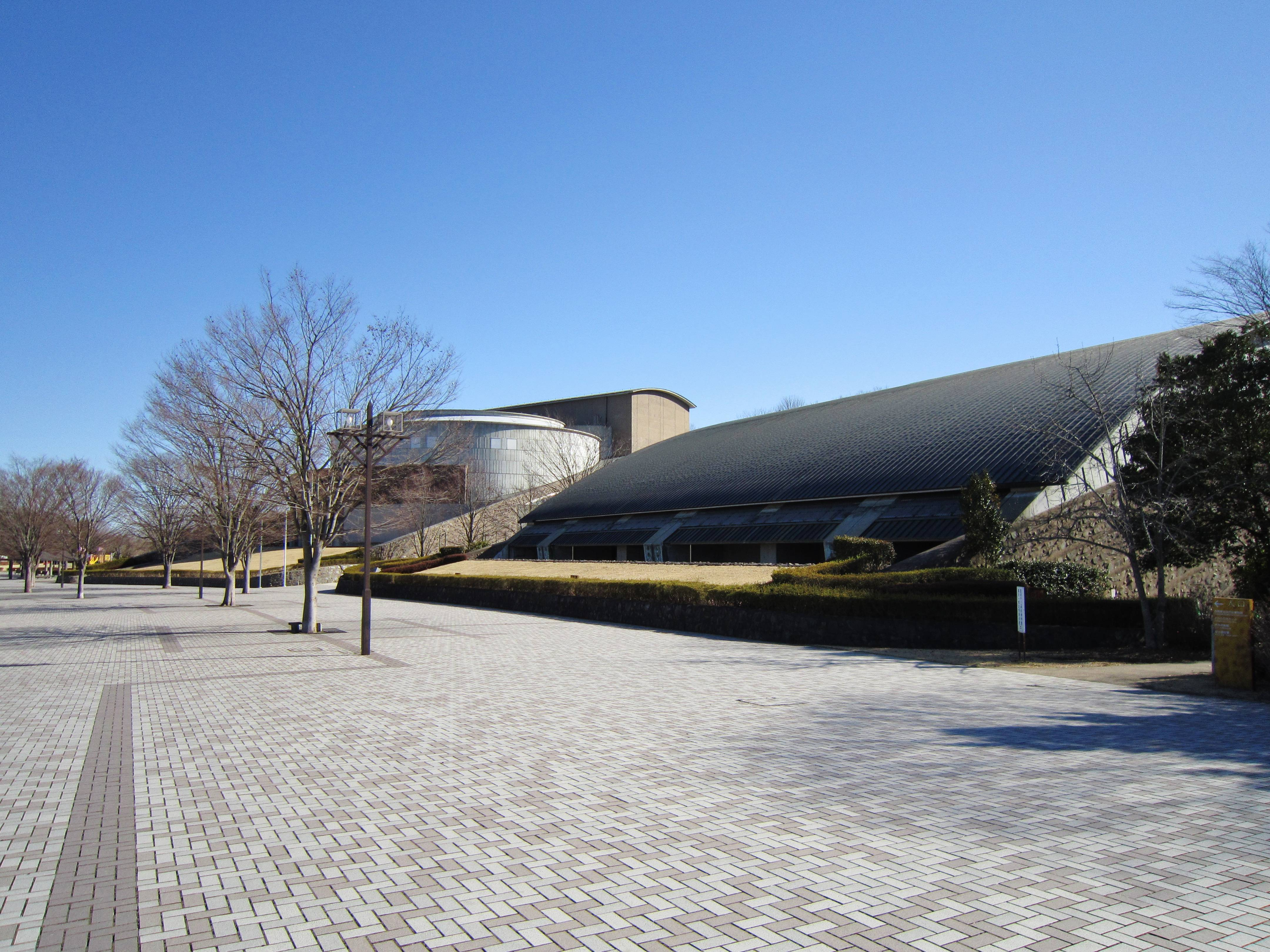
- Gunma Museum of Natural History

- Location within Japan

General information
- Location: 1674-1 Kamikuroiwa, Tomioka, Gunma Prefecture, Japan
- Coordinates: 36°16′12″N 138°52′01″E
- Opened: 16 July 1978

Website
- www.gmnh.pref.gunma.jp/english

Gunma Museum of Natural History (群馬県立自然史博物館, Gunma Kenritsu Shizenshi Hakubutsukan; formerly 群馬県立自然科学資料館) is a museum of the natural sciences in Tomioka, Gunma Prefecture, Japan.

== History ==
The museum first opened in 1978 under its old Japanese name, after repairs to the former Gunma Prefectural Museum (群馬県立博物館). In 1996, the old museum closed, and its collection was transferred, before reopening under its current name in a new building to designs by Uchii Shōzō. On 8 August 2008, the museum received its two millionth visitor, and on 7 August 2015, its three millionth.

== Publications ==
- Bulletin of the Gunma Museum of Natural History (群馬県立自然史博物館研究報告) (1996—present)

== See also ==
- Gunma Prefectural Museum of History
- Tomioka Silk Mill
