= The Museum of Modern Art, Gunma =

- 群馬県立近代美術館

General information
- Location: 992-1 Watanuki-machi, Takasaki, Gunma Prefecture, Japan
- Coordinates: 36°17′55″N 139°04′43″E
- Opened: October 1974
- Renovated: 2008

Website
- Official website

The Museum of Modern Art, Gunma (群馬県立近代美術館, Gunma kenritsu kindai bijutsukan) opened in Takasaki, Gunma Prefecture, Japan, in 1974. The collection includes works by Monet, Renoir, and Soga Jasoku.

== See also ==
- List of Cultural Properties of Japan - paintings (Gunma)
