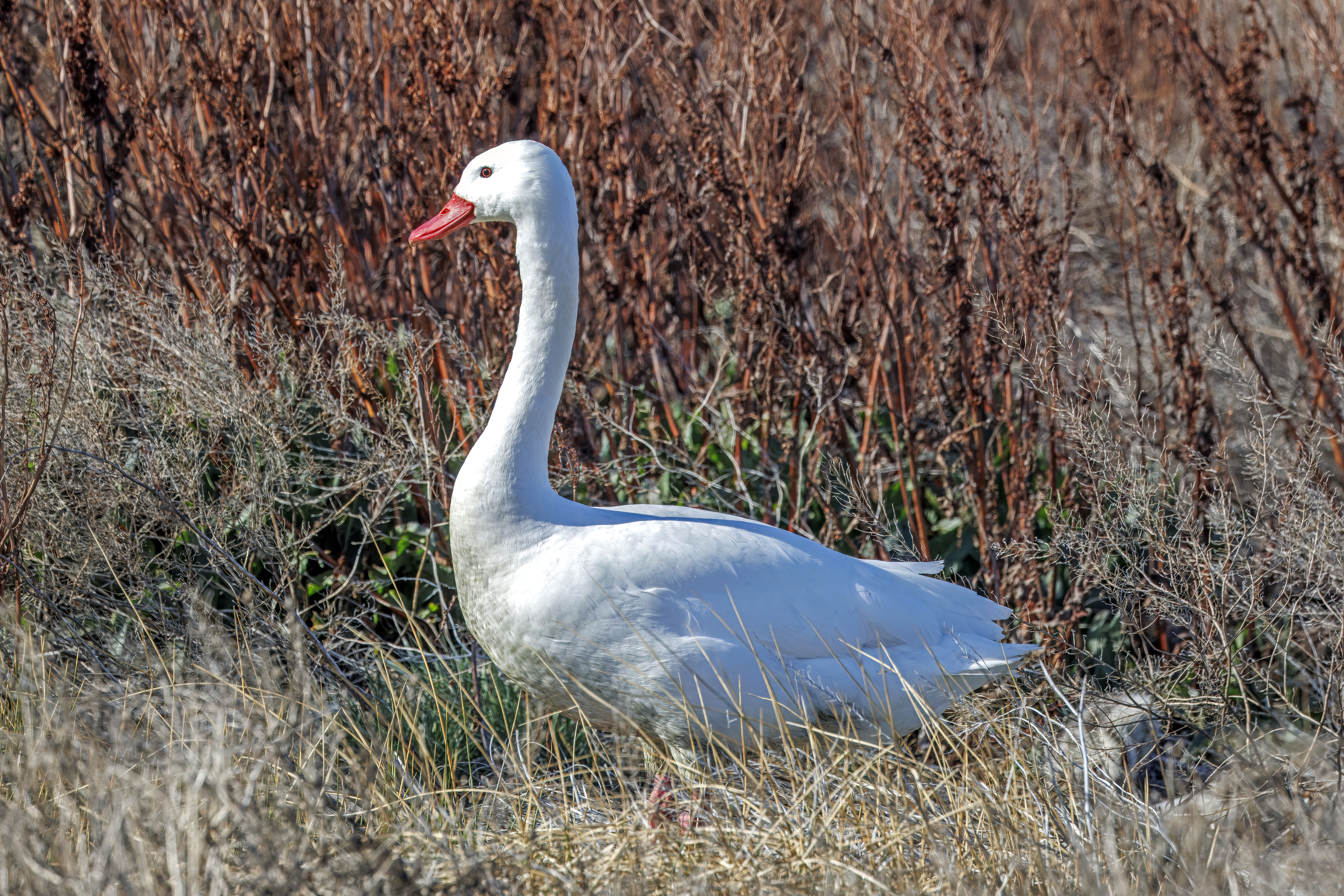
- At El Calafate, Argentina

Conservation status
- Least Concern (IUCN 3.1)
- CITES Appendix II

Scientific classification
- Kingdom: Animalia
- Phylum: Chordata
- Class: Aves
- Order: Anseriformes
- Family: Anatidae
- Subfamily: Anserinae
- Genus: Coscoroba; Reichenbach, 1853
- Species: C. coscoroba

Binomial name
- Coscoroba coscoroba (Molina, 1782)

= Coscoroba swan =

Species of waterfowl

The coscoroba swan (Coscoroba coscoroba) is a species of waterfowl in the subfamily Anserinae of the family Anatidae. It is found in Argentina, Bolivia, Brazil, Chile, Paraguay, Uruguay, and the Falkland Islands. It is one of South America's largest species of waterfowl.

== Taxonomy and systematics ==
The coscoroba swan's placement within the family Anatidae is not fully agreed upon, with a 2014 genetic study positing a phylogenetic relationship between this species and the Cape Barren goose (Cereopsis novaehollandiae). BirdLife International's Handbook of the Birds of the World has adopted this approach and puts the coscoroba swan and Cape Barren goose together in the tribe Cereopsini, which it places as basal to Cygnus and all other geese. However, the South American Classification Committee of the American Ornithological Society, the International Ornithological Committee (IOC), and the Clements taxonomy treat the Cape Barren goose as basal to other geese, which themselves precede the coscoroba and other swans in a linear sequence. Even those three systems differ, with the IOC placing the coscoroba before Cygnus and the other two after it in their lists.

The coscoroba swan is the only member of the genus Coscoroba and has no subspecies.

== Description ==
The coscoroba swan is among the largest waterfowl in South America, but smaller than the true swans, making it the smallest "swan" species. It is somewhat goose-like in appearance with a duck-like bill. It is shorter-necked than other swans. Unlike other swans, its feathers go straight to the base of the bill. The adults are completely white, except for black tips to the outer six primary feathers. They have bright pink or red legs and feet.

Their posture and longer legs allow the coscoroba swan to walk easily on land, this also lets them take off into flight quickly from land or water, much faster than the true swans.

The sexes are similar, but the male is larger. Males can weigh up to 5.4 kg (12 lb). The coscoroba swan's wingspan can range 1.4–1.6 m (4.6–5.2 ft), with a body length of 90–115 cm (2.95–3.77 ft). The wing length of males is 44–49.8 cm (17.3–19.6 in) and in females 41.5–47.7 cm (16.3–18.8 in). Those in southern Brazil have differing measurements, the wings of males being 37.5–39 cm (14.8–15.4 in) and females 35–35.8 cm (13.8–14.1 in).

Standard Measurements (in southern Brazil)
	Male	Female
Weight	3.05–5.14 kg (6.7–11.3 lb)	2.4–4.5 kg (5.3–9.9 lb)
Total culmen	62.8–78.8 mm (2.47–3.10 in)	59.8–71.8 mm (2.35–2.83 in)
Tarsus	93.3–117.2 mm (3.67–4.61 in)	84.6–104.5 mm (3.33–4.11 in)
Tail length	145–190 mm (5.7–7.5 in)	141–187 mm (5.6–7.4 in)

== Distribution and habitat ==
The coscoroba swan is a year-round resident of central Argentina and along the Uruguay-southern Brazil coast. It also breeds, but does not winter from southern Chile and Argentina south to Tierra del Fuego and occasionally to the Falkland Islands. In winter, its range extends north to central Chile, northern Argentina, Paraguay, Uruguay, and southern Brazil. It has been recorded as a vagrant in Bolivia and at several locations in Brazil north of its usual limit. The coscoroba swan inhabits well-vegetated lagoons, freshwater swamps, and sometimes human-made reservoirs. It is mainly a bird of the lowlands, though there are scattered records as high as 1,300 m (4,300 ft) and at least one at 2,000 m (6,600 ft).

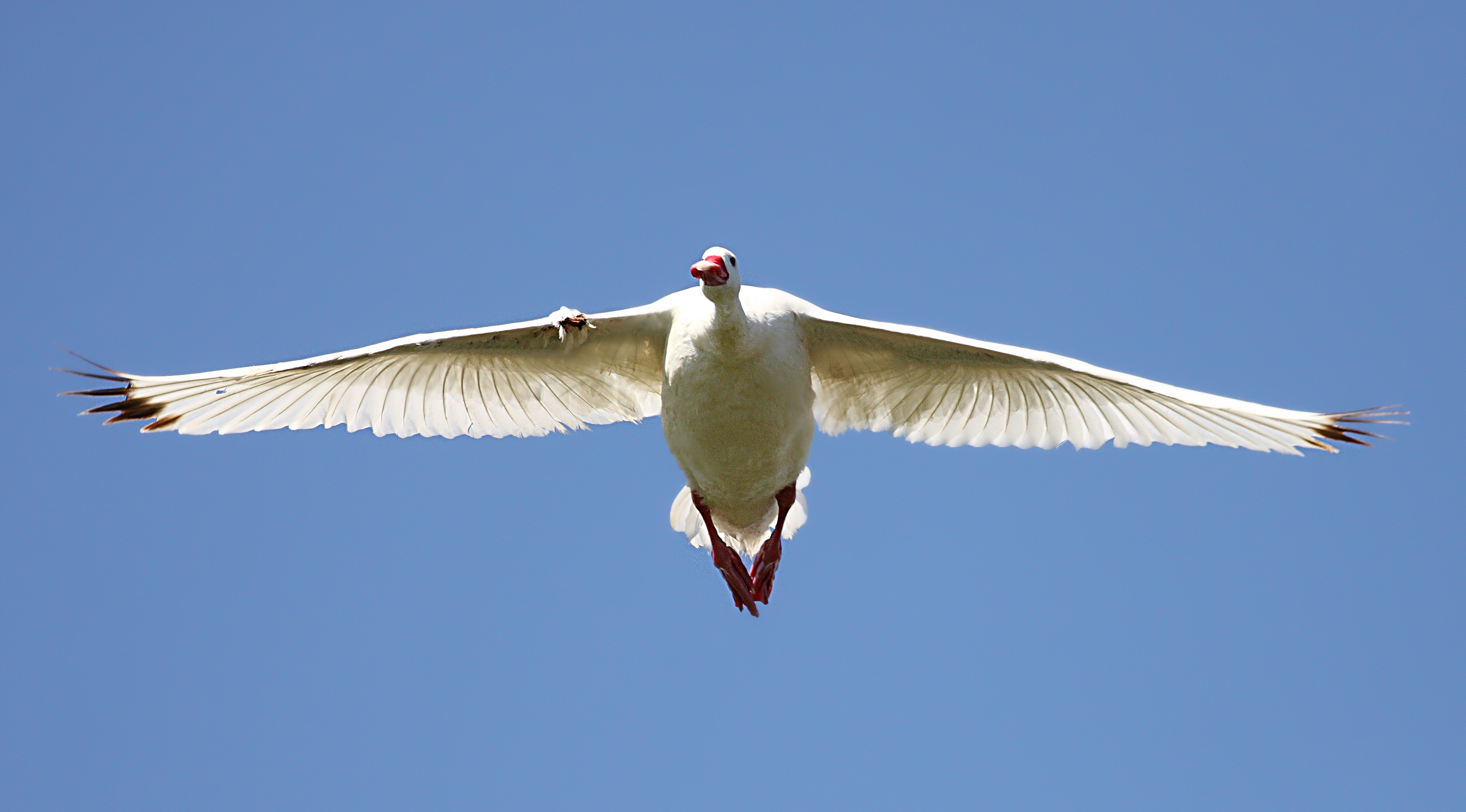

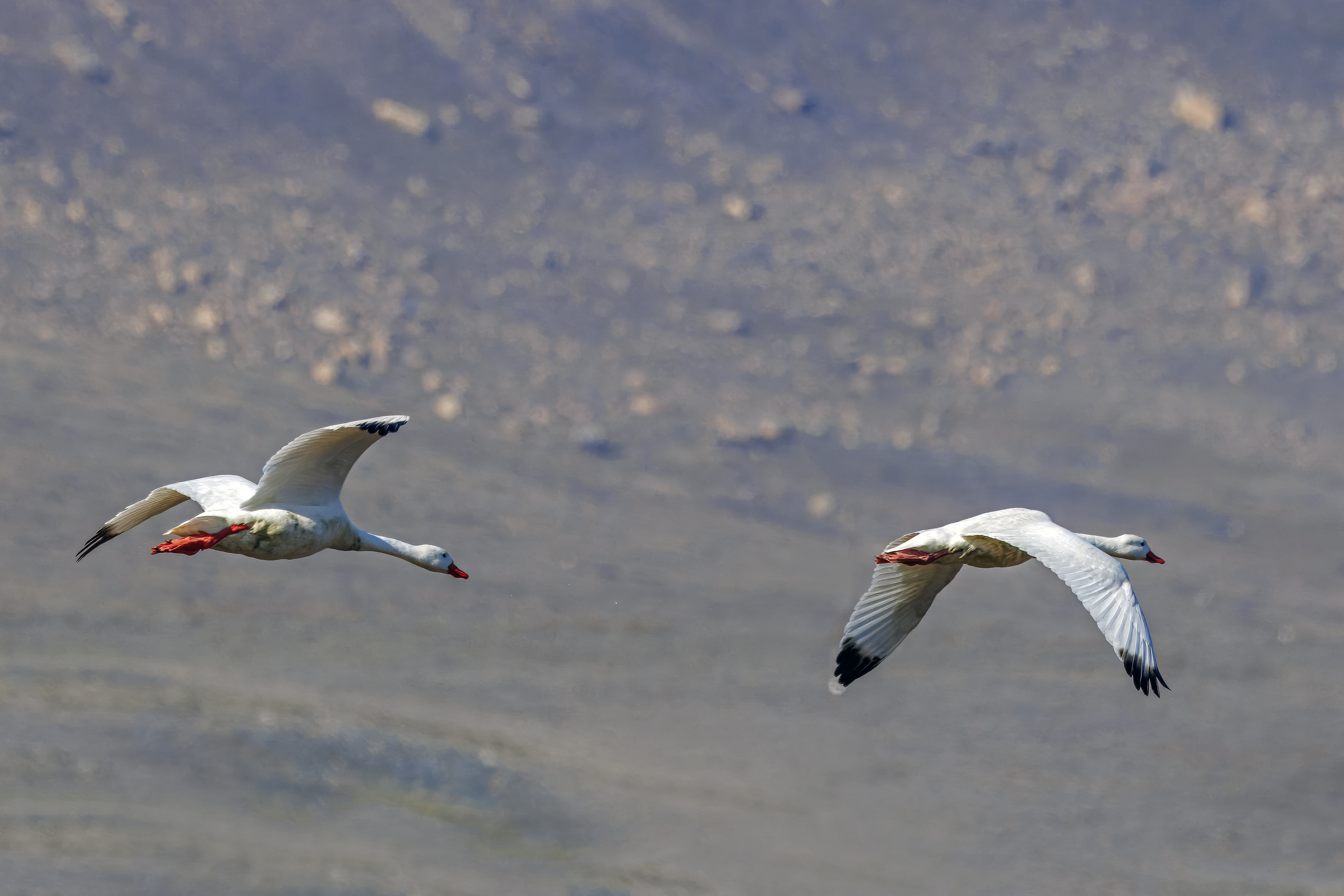

== Behavior ==
=== Feeding ===
The coscoroba swan's diet has not been studied in detail, but it apparently feeds on aquatic and some terrestrial plants, small aquatic invertebrates, and small fish. It forages mainly while swimming or wading in shallow water and in contrast to other swans rarely upends. It also grazes on land. It often feeds with black-necked swans (Cygnus melanocoryphus).

=== Breeding ===
The coscoroba swan breeds in the local spring, which is May to October in northern Argentina, July to December in Chile, and July and August in southern Brazil. The species forms long-term pair bonds. Its nest is a mound of vegetation lined with soft grass constructed by both members (sometimes mainly the male) of a pair on a small islet, partially floating in a reedbed or long grass close to water. The clutch size is four to nine oval eggs that weigh about 167 g (5.9 oz) with dimensions of around 82–94.5 mm (3.23–3.72 in) in length and 52.9–67 mm (2.08–2.64 in) in width. Males guard females during the incubation period of about 35 days. The chicks hatch with grey-ish white down and a black cap. They are cared for by both adults and fledge at 13–14 weeks of age, and reach adult size after about 8 months. Double-brooding has been documented, where the female began incubating a second clutch 40–50 days after hatching the first. They sometimes stay with adults until they are a year old, even up to two years in captivity. In captivity, coscoroba swans can live 20 years.

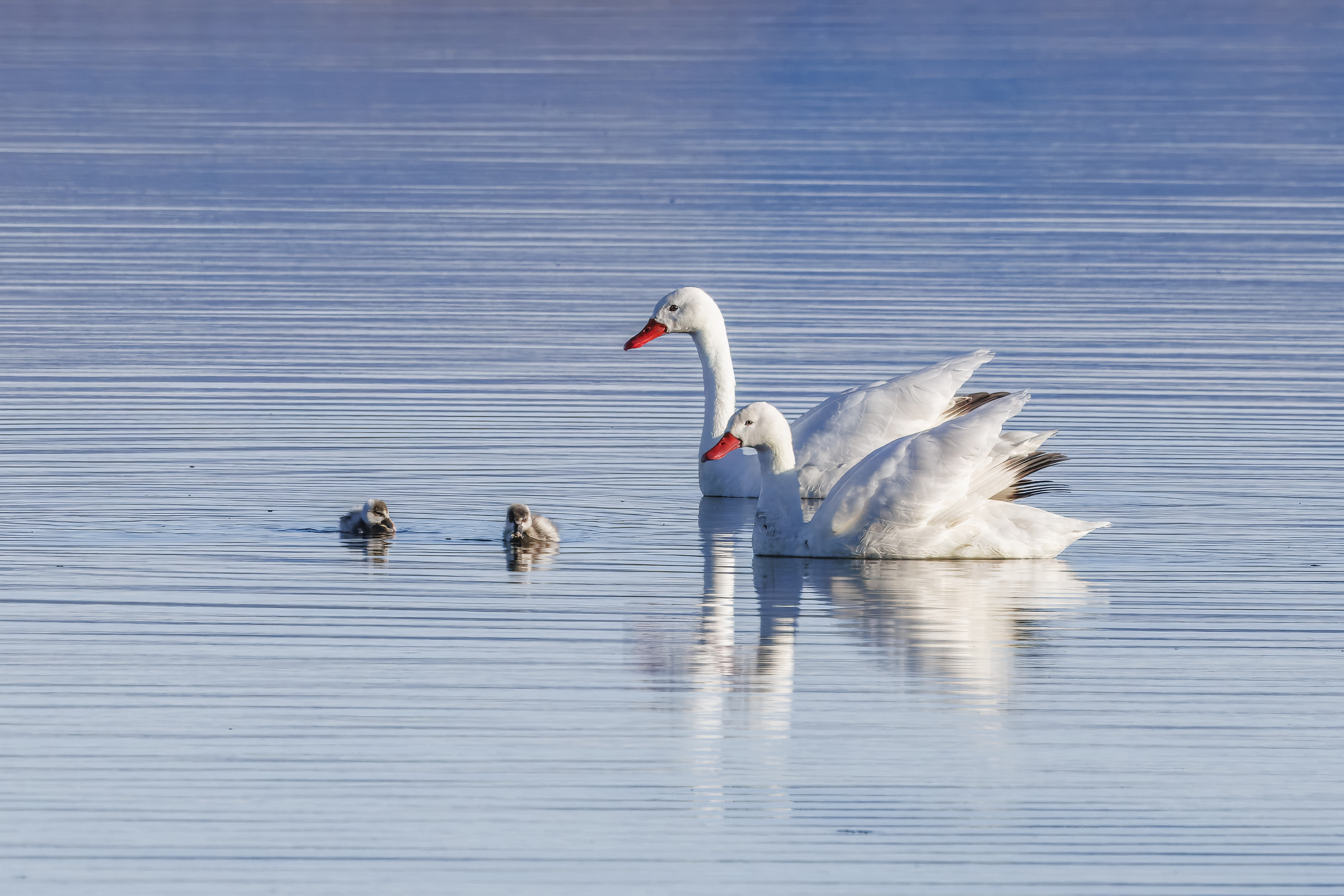
Pair with cygnets, Argentina

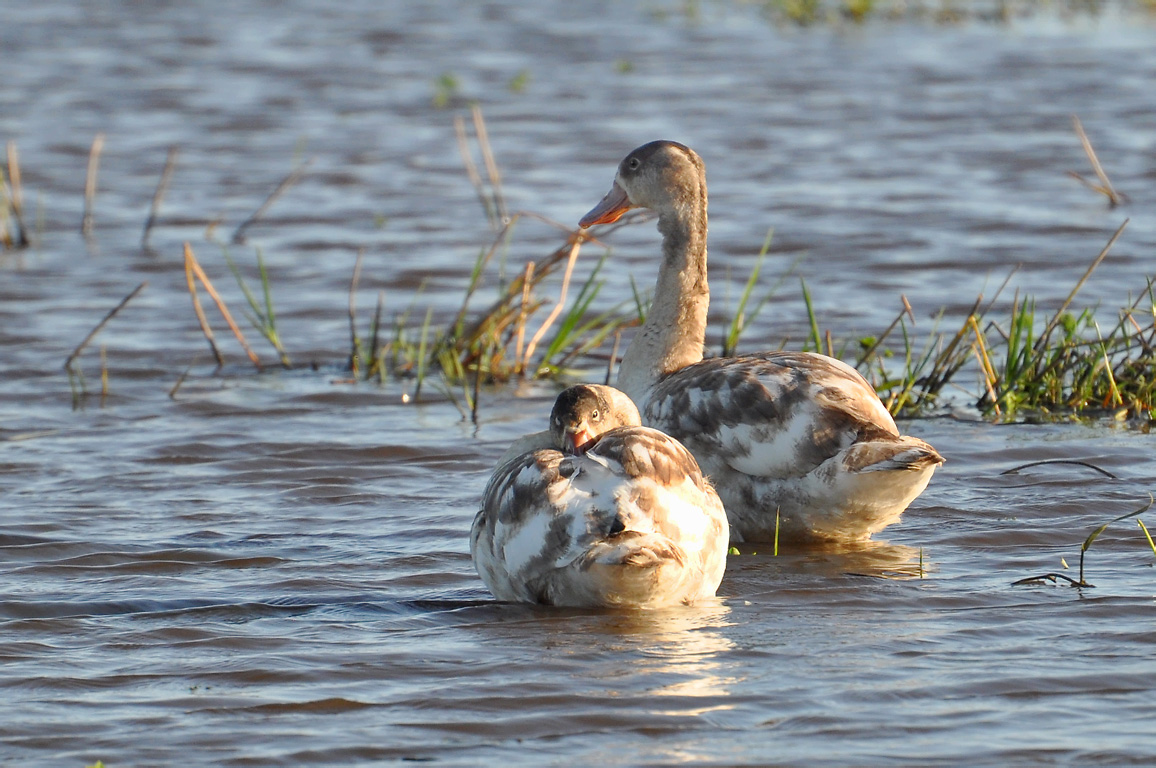
Juveniles in Rio Grande do Sul, Brazil

=== Vocalization ===
The coscoroba swan makes an onomatopoeic "cos-cor-oo", usually as a threat to intruders. They also make a "monosyllabic hooting note" as a contact call between mates. Immature birds make "loud chirps and trills".

== Status ==
The IUCN has assessed the coscoroba swan as being of Least Concern. It has a large range and its estimated population of 6,700 to 17,000 mature individuals is believed to be stable. No immediate threats have been identified. The species' population varies dramatically at different parts of its range, being fairly common in Argentina, uncommon in Paraguay and Uruguay, rare in Chile, and uncertain in Brazil. The "[g]reatest threat seems to be loss of temperate marsh habitats due to urbanization and agricultural developments".

== Gallery ==
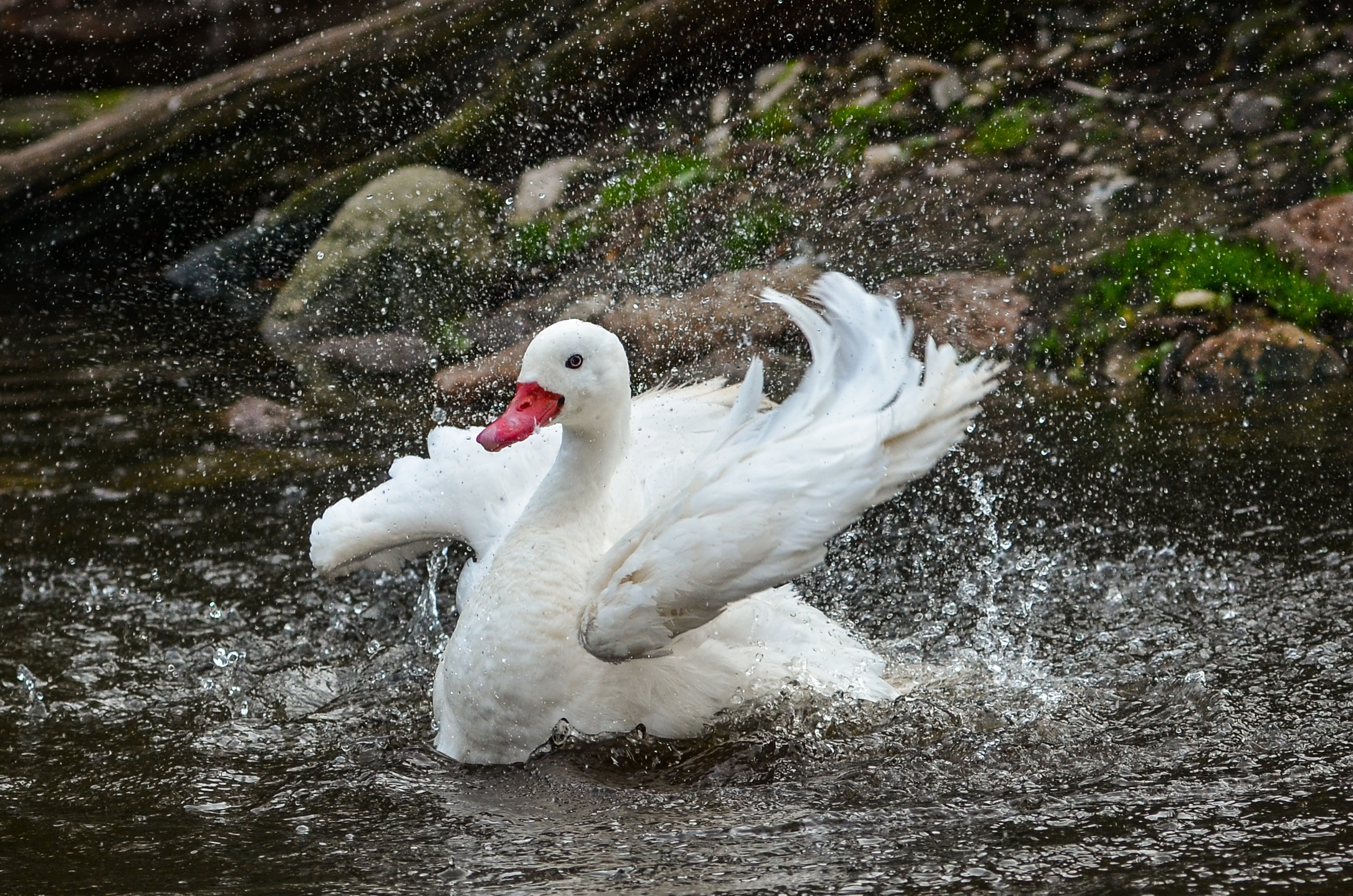
Bath taking at Weltvogelpark Walsrode
