= List of Anseriformes =

Anseriformes is an order of birds belonging to the clade Galloanseres. It consists of 3 families, 58 genera and 171 living species. Extinct species assignment follows the Mikko's Phylogeny Archive and Paleofile.com websites. This list is based on the taxonomy of the HBW and BirdLife International Illustrated Checklist of the Birds of the World by Josep del Hoyo and Nigel J. Collar also used by HBW, BirdLife International and IUCN and also includes historically extinct species and the presumed date of extinction

== Summary of 2006 IUCN Red List categories ==

Conservation status [v2021-2, the data is current as of November 16, 2021]:

EX - extinct,
EW - extinct in the wild
CR - critically endangered
EN - endangered
VU - vulnerable
NT - near threatened
LC - least concern
DD - data deficient
NE - not evaluated

== Phylogeny ==
Living Anseriformes based on the work by John Boyd.

- - Anhimae
    - Anhimidae
      - Anhima
      - Chauna
  - Anseres
    - Anseranatidae
      - Anseranas
    - Anatidae
      - Dendrocygninae
        - Thalassornis
        - Dendrocygna
      - - ?Plectropterinae
          - Plectropterus
        - Stictonettinae
          - Stictonetta
        - - Anserinae
            - ?Nettapodini
              - Nettapus
            - Biziurini
              - Biziura
            - - Oxyurini
                - Heteronetta
                - - Nomonyx
                  - Oxyura
              - Anserini
                - Malacorhynchina
                  - Malacorhynchus
                - - Cereopsina
                    - Coscoroba
                    - Cereopsis
                  - - Cygnina
                      - Sthenelides
                      - Cygnus
                    - Anserina
                      - Branta
                      - Anser
          - Anatinae
            - Tadornini
              - Merganettina
                - Merganetta
              - - Chleophagina
                  - Chloephaga
                  - - Oressochen
                    - Neochen
                - Tadornina
                  - Radjah
                  - - Tadorna
                    - Alopochen
            - Mergini
              - Histrionicus
              - - †Camptorhynchus
                - - Clangula
                  - - Somanterina
                      - Polysticta
                      - Somateria
                    - Mergina
                      - Melanitta
                      - - Bucephala
                        - - Mergellus
                          - - Lophodytes
                            - Mergus
            - Cairinini
              - Cairina
              - Aix
            - Callonettini
              - Callonetta
            - - ?Salvadorina
            - - Aythyini
                - - Chenonetta
                  - - Hymenolaimus
                    - Sarkidiornis
                - - - Pteronetta
                    - Cyanochen
                  - - Marmaronetta
                    - - Asarcornis
                      - - Netta
                        - - Metopiana
                          - Aythya
              - Anatini
                - - - Sibirionetta
                    - Spatula
                  - - Tachyeres
                    - - Lophonetta
                      - - Amazonetta
                        - Speculanas
                - - Mareca
                  - Anas

== Species ==
=== Family Anhimidae (Screamers) ===
- †Chaunoides de Alvarenga 1999
  - †Chaunoides antiquus de Alvarenga 1999
- Genus Anhima Brisson 1760
  - Anhima cornuta (Linnaeus 1766) Brisson 1760 (horned screamer) LC
- Genus Chauna Illiger 1811
  - Chauna chavaria (Linnaeus 1766) (northern screamer) NT
  - Chauna torquata (Oken 1816) (southern screamer) LC

=== Family Anseranatidae (magpie goose) ===
- Genus ?†Anserpica Mourer-Chauviré, Berthet & Hugueney 2004
  - †Anserpica kiliani Mourer-Chauviré, Berthet & Hugueney 2004
- Subfamily †Anatalavinae Olson 1999
  - Genus †Anatalavis Olson & Parris 1987
    - †Anatalavis rex (Shufeldt 1915) Olson & Parris 1987
    - †Anatalavis oxfordi Olson 1999
- Subfamily Anseranatinae Salvadori 1895
  - Genus †Eoanseranas Worthy & Scanlon 2009
    - †Eoanseranas handae Worthy & Scanlon 2009 (Hand's dawn magpie goose)
  - Genus Anseranas Lesson 1828
    - Anseranas semipalmata (Latham 1798) (magpie goose) LC

=== Family †Presbyornithidae ===
- Genus †Headonornis Harrison & Walker 1976
  - †Headonornis hantoniensis (Lydekker 1891) Harrison & Walker 1976
- Genus †Presbyornis Wetmore 1926
  - †Presbyornis mongoliensis Kuročkin & Dyke 2010
  - †Presbyornis recurvirostrus (Hardy 1959) Ericson 2000
  - †Presbyornis pervetus Wetmore 1926
- Genus †Telmabates Howard 1955
  - †Telmabates antiquus Howard 1955
  - †Telmabates howardae Cracraft 1970
- Genus †Teviornis Kuročkin, Dyke & Karhu 2002
  - †Teviornis gobiensis Kuročkin, Dyke & Karhu 2002
- Genus †Wilaru Boles et al., 2013
  - †Wilaru tedfordi Boles et al., 2013
  - †Wilaru prideauxi Vanesa et al., 2016

=== Family †Paranyrocidae ===
- Genus †Paranyroca Miller & Compton 1939
  - †Paranyroca magna Miller & Compton 1939

=== Family Anatidae (ducks, geese, swans) ===
==== Anatidae incertae sedis ====
- †"Anas" albae Jánossy 1979
- †"Anas" amotape Campbell 1979
- †"Anas" eppelsheimensis Lambrecht 1933
- †"Anas" isarensis Lambrecht 1933
- †"Anas" luederitzensis Lambrecht 1929
- †"Anas" sanctaehelenae Campbell 1979
- †"Anser" scaldii Lambrecht 1933
- †"Cygnopterus" alphonsi Cheneval 1984
- †"Oxyura" doksana Mlíkovský 2002
- Genus †Allgoviachen Mayr, Lechner & Böhme, 2022
  - †Allgoviachen tortonica Mayr, Lechner & Böhme, 2022
- Genus †Ankonetta Cenizo & Agnolín 2010
  - †Ankonetta larriestra Cenizo & Agnolín 2010
- Genus †Cayaoa Tonni 1979
  - †Cayaoa bruneti Tonni 1979
- Genus †Aldabranas Harrison & Walker 1978
  - †Aldabranas cabri Harrison & Walker 1978
- Genus †Chenoanas Zelenkov 2012
  - †Chenoanas deserta Zelenkov 2012
  - †Chenoanas asiatica Zelenkov et al., 2018
- Genus †Helonetta Emslie 1992
  - †Helonetta brodkorbi Emslie 1992
- Genus †Loxornis Ameghino 1894
  - †Loxornis clivus Ameghino 1894
- Genus †Mioquerquedula Zelenkov & Kuročkin 2012
  - †Mioquerquedula minutissima Zelenkov & Kuročkin 2012
- Genus †Shiriyanetta Watanabe & Matsuoka 2015
  - †Shiriyanetta goedertorum (Barnes et al., 1995)
  - †Shiriyanetta hasegawai Watanabe & Matsuoka 2015
- Genus †Teleornis Ameghino 1899
  - †Teleornis impressus Ameghino 1899

==== Subfamily †Romainvilliinae ====
- Genus †Romainvillia Lebedinský 1927
  - †Romainvillia stehlini Lebedinský 1927
- Genus †Saintandrea Mayr & De Pietri 2013
  - †Saintandrea chenoides Mayr & De Pietri 2013

==== Subfamily †Dendrocheninae ====
- Genus †Dendrochen Miller 1944
  - †Dendrochen integra (Miller 1944) Cheneval 1987
  - †Dendrochen oligocaena (Tugarinov 1940)
  - †Dendrochen robusta Miller 1944
- Genus †Manuherikia Worthy et al., 2007
  - †Manuherikia lacustrina Worthy et al., 2007 (Manuherikia duck)
  - †Manuherikia minuta Worthy et al., 2007 (Minute Manuherikia duck)
  - †Manuherikia douglasi Worthy et al., 2008 (Douglas’ duck)
- Genus †Mionetta Livezey & Martin 1988
  - †Mionetta robusta (Milne-Edwards 1868) Mlíkovský 2002
  - †Mionetta arvernensis (Lydekker 1891a)
  - †Mionetta blanchardi (Milne-Edwards 1863) Livezey & Martin 1988
  - †Mionetta consobrina (Milne-Edwards 1867) Livezey & Martin 1988
  - †Mionetta natator (Milne-Edwards 1867) Livezey & Martin 1988

==== Subfamily Dendrocygninae ====
- Genus Thalassornis Eyton 1838
  - Thalassornis leuconotus Eyton 1838 (white-backed duck) LC
    - T. l. leuconotus Eyton 1838 (African white-backed duck)
    - T. l. insularis (Richmond 1897) (Madagascan white-backed duck)
- Genus Dendrocygna Swainson 1837 (whistling/tree ducks)
  - Subgenus (Lamprocygna) Boetticher 1949
    - Dendrocygna viduata (Linnaeus 1766) (white-faced whistling-duck) LC
    - Dendrocygna autumnalis (Linnaeus 1758) (black-bellied whistling-duck) LC
      - D. a. fulgens Friedmann 1947 (Northern black-bellied whistling duck)
      - D. a. autumnalis (Linnaeus 1758) (Southern black-bellied whistling duck)
  - Subgenus (Nesocygna) Boetticher 1949
    - Dendrocygna guttata (Schlegel 1866) (spotted whistling-duck) LC
    - Dendrocygna arborea (Linnaeus 1758) (West Indian whistling-duck) NT B2ab(i,ii,iii,iv)
  - Subgenus (Dendrocygna) Swainson 1837
    - Dendrocygna bicolor (Vieillot 1816) (fulvous whistling-duck) LC
    - Dendrocygna eytoni (Eyton 1838) (plumed whistling-duck) LC
    - Dendrocygna javanica (Horsfield 1821) (lesser whistling-duck) LC
    - Dendrocygna arcuata (Horsfield 1824) (wandering whistling-duck) LC
      - D. a. arcuata (Horsfield 1824) (East Indian wandering whistling duck)
      - D. a. pygmaea Mayr 1945 (lesser wandering whistling duck)
      - D. a. australis Reichenbach 1850 (Australian wandering whistling duck)

==== Subfamily Plectropterinae ====
- Genus Plectropterus Stephens 1824
  - Plectropterus gambensis (Linnaeus 1766) Stephens 1824 (spur-winged goose) LC
    - P. g. gambensis (Linnaeus 1766) (Gambian spur-winged goose)
    - P. g. niger Sclater 1877 (black spur-winged goose)

==== Subfamily Stictonettinae ====
- Genus Stictonetta Reichenbach 1853
  - Stictonetta naevosa (Gould 1841) Reichenbach 1853 (freckled duck) LC

==== Subfamily Anserinae ====
- Tribe Nettapodini
  - Genus Nettapus von Brandt 1836 (Pygmy geese)
    - Subgenus (Nettapus) von Brandt 1836
      - Nettapus auritus (Boddaert 1783) (African pygmy-goose) LC
    - Subgenus (Cheniscus) Eyton 1838
      - Nettapus pulchellus Gould 1842 (green pygmy-goose) LC
      - Nettapus coromandelianus (Gmelin 1789) (cotton pygmy-goose) LC
        - N. c. albipennis Gould 1842 (greater cotton pygmy goose)
        - N. c. coromandelianus (Gmelin 1789) (lesser cotton pygmy goose)
- Tribe Biziurini Mathews 1946
  - Genus Biziura Stephens 1824 (musk ducks)
    - †Biziura exhumata DeVis 1889
    - †Biziura delautouri Forbes 1892 (New Zealand musk duck)
    - Biziura lobata (Shaw 1796) (musk duck) LC
      - B. l. lobata (Shaw 1796)
      - B. l. menziesi
- Tribe Oxyurini Swainson 1831
  - Genus †Dunstanetta Worthy et al., 2007
    - †Dunstanetta johnstoneorum Worthy et al., 2007 (Johnstone's ducks)
  - Genus †Lavadytis Stidham & Hilton 2015
    - †Lavadytis pyrenae Stidham & Hilton 2015
  - Genus †Pinpanetta Worthy 2009
    - †Pinpanetta tedfordi Worthy 2009
    - †Pinpanetta vickersrichae Worthy 2009
    - †Pinpanetta fromensis Worthy 2009
  - Genus †Tirarinetta Worthy 2008
    - †Tirarinetta kanunka Worthy 2008
  - Genus Heteronetta Salvadori 1865
    - Heteronetta atricapilla (Merrem 1841) Salvadori 1865 (black-headed duck) LC
  - Genus Nomonyx Ridgway 1880
    - Nomonyx dominicus (Linnaeus 1766) Ridgway 1880 (masked duck) LC
  - Genus Oxyura Bonaparte 1828
    - †Oxyura bessomi Howard 1963
    - †Oxyura hulberti Emslie 1992
    - †Oxyura vantetsi Worthy 2005 (New Zealand blue-billed/stiff-tailed duck)
    - †Oxyura zapatanima Alvarez 1977
    - Subgenus (Oxyura) Bonaparte 1828
      - Oxyura jamaicensis (Gmelin 1789) (ruddy duck) LC
    - Subgenus (Cerconectes) Wagler 1832
      - Oxyura ferruginea (Eyton 1838) (Andean duck) LC
      - Oxyura vittata (Philippi 1860) (lake duck) LC
      - Oxyura australis Gould 1837 non Horn 1983 (blue-billed duck) NT
      - Oxyura maccoa (Eyton 1838) (maccoa duck) VU A4be
      - Oxyura leucocephala (Scopoli 1769) (white-headed duck) EN A2bcde+4bcde
- Tribe Anserini Vigors 1825
  - Genus †Afrocygnus Louchart et al., 2005
    - †Afrocygnus chauvireae Louchart et al., 2005
  - Genus †Asiavis Nesov 1986
    - †Asiavis phosphatica Nesov 1986
  - Genus †Bonibernicla Kuročkin 1985
    - †Bonibernicla ponderosa Kuročkin 1985
  - Genus †Cygnavus Lambrecht 1931
    - †Cygnavus senckenbergi Lambrecht 1931
    - †Cygnavus formosus Korochkin 1968
  - Genus †Cygnopterus Lambrecht 1931a
    - †Cygnopterus neogradiensis Kessler & Hir 2009
    - †Cygnopterus affinis (Beneden 1883) Lambrecht 1931
  - Genus †Eremochen Brodkorb 1961
    - †Eremochen russelli Brodkorb 1961
  - Genus †Paracygnus Short 1969
    - †Paracygnus plattensis Short 1969
  - Genus †Presbychen Wetmore 1930
    - †Presbychen abavus Wetmore 1930
  - †“Chenopis” nanus De Vis 1905
  - †Anatidae sp. & gen. indet. (Long-legged shelduck)
  - †Anatidae sp. & gen. indet. (Rota flightless duck)
  - †Anatidae sp. & gen. indet. (Giant Hawaiʻi goose)
  - †Anatidae sp. & gen. indet. (Giant Oʻahu goose)
  - Subtribe Malacorhynchina von Boetticher 1950
    - Genus Malacorhynchus Swainson 1831
      - †Malacorhynchus scarletti Olson 1977 (Scarlett's duck)
      - Malacorhynchus membranaceus (Latham 1801) Swainson 1831 (pink-eared duck) LC
  - Subtribe Cereopsina Vigors 1825 fide Gray
    - Genus †Cnemiornis Owen 1866 (New Zealand Geese)
      - †Cnemiornis calcitrans Owen 1866 (South Island Goose)
      - †Cnemiornis septentrionalis Oliver 1955 (North Island Goose)
    - Genus Cereopsis Latham 1801
      - Cereopsis novaehollandiae Latham 1801 (Cape Barren goose) LC
        - C. n. novaehollandiae Latham 1801 (eastern/New Holland Cape Barren goose)
        - C. n. grisea (Vieillot 1818) (Recherche/southwestern Cape Barren goose)
    - Genus Coscoroba Reichenbach 1853
      - Coscoroba coscoroba (Molina 1782) Reichenbach 1853 (coscoroba swan) LC
  - Subtribe Cygnina Vigors 1825 fide Gray (true swans)
    - Genus Cygnus Garsault 1764 (true swans)
      - Phylogeny of Cygnus
        - - (Sthenelides)
            C. melancoryphus
          - - (Chenopis)
              C. atratus
            - - (Cygnus)
                C. olor
              - (Olor)
                - C. buccinator
                - - C. cygnus
                  - C. columbianus
      - †Cygnus davidii (Père David's swan)
      - †Cygnus herenthalsi (van Beneden 1871) Mlíkovský 2002
      - †Cygnus hibbardi Brodkorb 1958
      - †Cygnus lacustris (De Vis 1905)
      - Subgenus (Sthenelides)
        - Cygnus melanocoryphus (Molina 1782) (black-necked swan) LC
      - Subgenus (Chenopis) Wagler 1832
        - †Cygnus sumnerensis (Forbes 1890) Oliver 1930 sensu Holdaway & al 2001 (New Zealand & Chatham Islands swan)
        - Cygnus atratus (Latham 1790) (black swan) LC
      - Subgenus (Cygnus) Garsault 1764
        - †Cygnus atavus (Fraas 1870) Mlíkovský 1992
        - †Cygnus paloregonus Cope 1878
        - †Cygnus equitum Bate 1916 sensu Livezey 1997 (Dwarf Maltese swan)
        - Cygnus olor (Gmelin 1789) (mute swan) LC
          - †C. o. bergmanni Serebrovsky 1940
          - C. o. olor (Gmelin 1789)
      - Subgenus (Olor) (Wagler 1832)
        - †Cygnus mariae Bickart 1990
        - †Cygnus csakvarensis Lambrecht 1933
        - †Cygnus falconeri Parker 1865 sensu Livezey 1997a (Giant Maltese swan)
        - †Cygnus verae Boev 2000
        - Cygnus buccinator Richardson 1831 (trumpeter swan) LC
        - Cygnus cygnus (Linnaeus 1758) (whooper swan) LC
        - Cygnus columbianus (Ord 1815) (tundra swan) LC
          - C. c. bewickii (Yarrel 1830) sensu Carboneras 1992 (Bewick's Swan)
          - C. c. columbianus (Ord 1815) (Tundra Swan)
  - Subtribe Anserina Vigors 1825 fide Gray
    - Genus Branta Scopoli 1769 (black geese)
      - Phylogeny of Branta
        - - (Branta)
            B. bernicla
          - - (Leucopareia)
              B. ruficollis
            - (Leucoblepharon)
              - B. sandvicensis
              - - B. canadensis
                - - B. leucopsis
                  - B. hutchinsii
      - †Branta dickey Miller 1924
      - †Branta esmeralda Burt 1929
      - †Branta howardae Miller 1930
      - †Branta hypsibata (Cope 1878)
      - †Branta propinqua Schufeldt 1892
      - †Branta rhuax (Wetmore 1943) Olson 2013 (Giant Hawai'i/Wetmore's goose)
      - †Branta thessaliensis Boev & Koufos 2006
      - Subgenus (Branta) Scopoli 1769
        - Branta bernicla (Linnaeus 1758) (brent goose) LC
          - B. b. bernicla (Linnaeus 1758) (Dark-bellied Brant Goose)
          - B. b. nigricans (Lawrence 1846) (black-bellied Brant goose)
          - B. b. hrota (Müller 1776) (pale-bellied brant)
      - Subgenus (Leucopareia) Reichenbach 1852
        - Branta ruficollis (Pallas 1769) (red-breasted goose) VU A2bcd+3bcd+4bcd
      - Subgenus (Leucoblepharon) Baird 1858
        - Branta leucopsis (Bechstein 1803) (barnacle goose) LC
        - Branta hutchinsii (Richardson 1832) (cackling goose) LC
          - B. h. leucopareia (von Brandt 1836) (Aleutian/Bering cackling goose)
          - B. h. minima Ridgway 1885 (Small cackling goose)
          - B. h. taverneri Delacour 1951 (Taverner's cackling goose)
          - B. h. hutchinsii (Richardson 1832) (Richardson's cackling goose)
        - †Branta hylobadistes Olson & James 1991 (Greater nene, Nēnē-nui)
        - Branta sandvicensis (Vigors 1834) (Hawaiian goose) VU D1
        - Branta canadensis (Linnaeus 1758) (Canada goose) LC
          - B. c. occidentalis (Baird 1858) (dusky Canada goose)
          - B. c. fulva Delacour 1951 (Vancouver Canada goose)
          - B. c. maxima Delacour 1951 (giant Canada goose)
          - B. c. moffitti Aldrich 1946 (Great Basin Canada goose)
          - B. c. parvipes (Cassin 1852) (Athabaska Canada goose)
          - B. c. interior Todd 1938 (Interior Canada goose)
          - B. c. canadensis (Linnaeus 1758) (Atlantic Canada goose)
    - Genus Anser Brisson 1760 (true geese)
      - Phylogeny of Anser
        - - (Eulabeia)
            A. indicus
          - - (Chen)
              - A. canagicus
              - - A. rossii
                - A. caerulescens
            - (Anser)
              - A. anser
              - - A. cygnoides
                - - - A. erythropus
                    - A. albifrons
                  - - A. fabalis
                    - - A. brachyrhynchus
                      - A. middendorffii
                      - A. serrirostris
      - †Anser arenosus Bickart 1990
      - †Anser arizonae Bickart 1990
      - †Anser azerbaidzhanicus Serebrovsky 1940
      - †Anser devjatkini Kuročkin 1971
      - †Anser djuktaiensis Zelenkov & Kuročkin 2014
      - †Anser eldaricus Burchak-Abramovich & Gadzyev 1978
      - †Anser pratensis (Short 1970)
      - †Anser tchikoicus Kuročkin 1985
      - †Anser thompsoni Martin & Mengel 1980
      - †Anser thraceiensis Burchak-Abramovich & Nikolov 1984
      - †Anser udabnensis Burchak-Abramovich 1957
      - Subgenus (Eulabeia) Reichenbach 1852
        - Anser indicus (Latham 1790) (bar-headed goose) LC
      - Subgenus (Chen) Boie 1822
        - †Anser pressa (Wetmore 1933) Brodkorb 1964 (Dwarf Snow goose)
        - Anser canagicus (Sevastianov 1802) (emperor goose) NT
        - Anser rossii Cassin 1861 (Ross's goose) LC
        - Anser caerulescens (Linnaeus 1758) (snow goose) LC
          - A. c. atlantica Kennard 1927 (greater snow goose)
          - A. c. caerulescens (Linnaeus 1758) (lesser snow goose)
      - Subgenus (Anser) Brisson 1760
        - Anser anser (Linnaeus 1758) (greylag goose) LC
          - A. a. anser (Linnaeus 1758) (Western Greylag Goose)
          - A. a. rubrirostris Swinhoe 1871 (Eastern Greylag Goose)
        - Anser cygnoides (Linnaeus 1758) (swan goose) VU A2bcd+3bcd+4bcd
        - Anser erythropus (Linnaeus 1758) (lesser white-fronted goose) VU A2bcd+3bcd+4bcd
        - Anser albifrons (greater white-fronted goose) LC
          - A. a. flavirostris Dalgety & Scott 1948 (Greenland white-fronted Goose)
          - A. a. albifrons (Scopoli 1769) (European white-fronted Goose)
          - A. a. elgasi Delacour & Ripley 1975 (Tule white-fronted goose)
          - A. a. gambelli Hartlaub 1852 (Gambel's white-fronted goose)
          - A. a. sponsa Banks 2011 (Pacific white-fronted goose)
        - Anser fabalis (Latham 1787) (Taiga bean goose) LC
          - A. f. fabalis (Latham 1787) (western taiga bean Goose)
          - A. f. johanseni Delacour 1951 (West Siberian taiga bean goose)
        - Anser brachyrhynchus Baillon 1834 (pink-footed goose) LC
        - Anser middendorffii Severtsov 1873 (East Siberian taiga bean goose)
        - Anser serrirostris Gould 1852 (Tundra bean Goose)
          - A. s. rossicus Buturlin 1933 (Russian tundra bean goose )
          - A. s. serrirostris Gould 1852 (East Siberian tundra bean goose)

==== Subfamily Anatinae ====
- Tribe Tadornini (Reichenbach 1849-50) (shelducks & sheldgeese)
  - Genus †Australotadorna Worthy 2009
    - †Australotadorna alecwilsoni Worthy 2009
  - Genus †Anabernicula Ross 1935
    - †Anabernicula minuscula (Wetmore 1924)
    - †Anabernicula oregonensis Howard 1964b
    - †Anabernicula gracilenta Ross 1935
  - Genus †Brantadorna Howard 1964
    - †Brantadorna downsi Howard 1964
    - †Brantadorna robusta (Short 1970) Livezey 1997
  - Genus †Centrornis Andrews 1897
    - †Centrornis majori Andrews 1897 (Malagasy sheldgoose)
  - Genus †Miotadorna Worthy et al., 2007
    - †Miotadorna sanctibathansi Worthy et al., 2007 (St. Bathans shelducks)
    - †Miotadorna catrionae Tennyson et al., 2022 (Catriona’s shelduck)
  - Genus †Nannonetta Campbell 1979
    - †Nannonetta invisitata Campbell 1979
  - Genus †Pleistoanser Agnolín 2006
    - †Pleistoanser bravardi Agnolín 2006
  - Subtribe Merganettina
    - Genus Merganetta Gould 1842
      - Merganetta armata Gould 1842 (torrent duck) LC
        - M. a. colombiana Des Murs 1845 (Colombian torrent duck)
        - M. a. leucogenis (Tschudi 1843) (Peruvian torrent duck)
        - M. a. turneri Sclater & Salvin 1869 (Turner's torrent duck)
        - M. a. garleppi von Berlepsch 1894 (Garlepp's/Bolivian torrent duck)
        - M. a. berlepschi Hartert 1909 (Berlepsch's torrent duck)
        - M. a. armata Gould 1842 (Chilean torrent duck)
  - Subtribe Chleophagina (Sheldgeese)
    - Genus Neochen Oberholser 1918
      - †Neochen barbadiana Brodkorb 1965
      - †Neochen pugil Winge 1887
      - †Neochen debilis (Ameghino 1891)
      - Neochen jubata (von Spix 1825) (Orinoco goose) NT
    - Genus Oressochen Bannister 1870
      - Oressochen melanoptera (Eyton 1838) Bannister 1870 (Andean goose) LC
    - Genus Chloephaga Eyton 1838
      - Phylogeny of Chloephaga
        - - - C. poliocephala
            - C. rubidiceps
          - - C. hybrida
            - C. picta
      - Chloephaga poliocephala Sclater 1857 (ashy-headed goose) LC
      - Chloephaga rubidiceps Sclater 1861 (ruddy-headed goose) LC
      - Chloephaga hybrida (Molina 1782) (kelp goose) LC
        - C. h. hybrida (Molina 1782) (lesser/Patagonian kelp goose)
        - C. h. malvinarum Phillips 1916 (greater/Falkland kelp goose)
      - Chloephaga picta (Gmelin 1789) (upland goose) LC
        - C. p. leucoptera Gmelin 1789) (greater Upland/Magellan goose)
        - C. p. picta (Gmelin 1789) (lesser Upland/Magellan goose)
  - Subtribe Tadornina (shelducks)
    - Genus Radjah Reichenbach 1852
      - Radjah radjah (Lesson 1828) Reichenbach 1852 (radjah shelduck) LC
        - R. r. radjah (Lesson 1828) (Moluccan/black-backed radjah shelduck)
        - R. r. rufitergum (Hartert 1905 (Australian/red-backed radjah shelduck)
    - Genus Alopochen Stejneger 1885
      - Alopochen aegyptiaca (Linnaeus 1766) (Egyptian goose) LC
      - †Alopochen kervazoi (Cowles 1994) Mourer-Chauviré et al., 1999 (Rèunion shelduck) EX 1710
      - †Alopochen mauritiana (Newton & Gadow 1893) (Mauritius shelduck) EX 1698
      - †Alopochen sirabensis (Andrews 1897) (Malagasy/Sirabe shelduck)
      - †Alopochen tarabukini (Kuročkin & Ganea 1972) Mlíkovský 2002
    - Genus Tadorna Boie 1822
      - Phylogeny of Tadorna
        - - ?T. cristata
          - T. tadorna
          - - T. cana
            - - T. ferruginea
              - T. tadornoides
              - T. variegata
      - †Tadorna minor Kessler & Hir 2012
      - †Tadorna petrina Kuročkin 1985
      - Tadorna tadorna (Linnaeus 1758) (common shelduck) LC
      - Tadorna ferruginea (Pallas 1764) (ruddy shelduck) LC
      - Tadorna cana (Gmelin 1789) (South African shelduck) LC
      - †T. cf. variegata (Chatham Islands shelduck)
      - Tadorna tadornoides (Jardine & Selby 1828) (Australian shelduck) LC
      - Tadorna variegata (Gmelin 1789) (paradise shelduck) LC
      - Tadorna cristata (Kuroda 1917) (crested shelduck) CR D
- Tribe Mergini Rafinesque 1815 (Sea ducks)
  - Genus †Chendytes Miller 1925
    - †Chendytes lawi Miller 1925 (Law's diving goose)
    - †Chendytes milleri Howard 1955
  - Genus †Megalodytes Howard 1992
    - †Megalodytes morejohni Howard 1992
  - Genus Histrionicus Lesson 1828
    - †Histrionicus shotwelli (Brodkorb 1961)
    - Histrionicus histrionicus (Linnaeus 1758) (harlequin duck) LC
  - Genus †Camptorhynchus Bonaparte 1838
    - †Camptorhynchus labradorius (Gmelin 1789) Bonaparte 1838 (Labrador duck) EX 1875
  - Genus Clangula Leach 1819 non Fleming 1822
    - †Clangula matraensis Kessler 2009
    - Clangula hyemalis (Linnaeus 1758) Leach 1819 (long-tailed duck) VU A4bce
  - Genus Somateria Leach 1819
    - Somateria fischeri (von Brandt 1847) (spectacled eider) NT
    - Somateria spectabilis (Linnaeus 1758) (king eider) LC
    - Somateria mollissima (Linnaeus 1758) (common eider) NT
      - S. m. v-nigrum Bonaparte & Gray 1855 (Pacific eider)
      - S. m. borealis (Brehm 1824) (northern eider)
      - S. m. sedentaria Snyder 1941 (Hudson Bay eider)
      - S. m. dresseri Sharpe 1871 (Atlantic eider)
      - S. m. faeroeensis Brehm 1831 (Faeroe eider)
      - S. m. mollissima (Linnaeus 1758) (European eider)
  - Genus Polysticta Eyton 1836
    - Polysticta stelleri (Pallas 1769) Eyton 1836 (Steller's eider) VU A2bcd+3bcd+4bcd
  - Genus Melanitta Boie 1822
    - Melanitta americana (Swainson 1832) (black scoter) NT
    - Melanitta nigra (Linnaeus 1758) (common scoter) LC
    - Melanitta perspicillata (Linnaeus 1758) (surf scoter) LC
    - Melanitta stejneri (Ridgway 1887) (Stejneger's/Siberian scoter) LC
    - Melanitta fusca (Linnaeus 1758) (velvet scoter) VU A2abcde+3cde+4bcde
      - M. f. fusca (Linnaeus 1758) (Velvet/European white-winged scoter)
      - M. f. deglandi (American white-winged scoter) LC
  - Genus Bucephala Baird 1858
    - †Bucephala cereti Boeuf & Mourer-Chauviré 1992
    - Bucephala albeola (Linnaeus 1758) (bufflehead) LC
    - Bucephala islandica (Gmelin 1789) (Barrow's goldeneye) LC
    - Bucephala clangula (Linnaeus 1758) (common goldeneye) LC
      - B. c. americana (Bonaparte 1838) (American goldeneye)
      - B. c. clangula (Linnaeus 1758) (European goldeneye)
  - Genus Mergellus Selby 1840
    - †Mergellus mochanovi Zelenkov & Kuročkin 2014
    - Mergellus albellus (Linnaeus 1758) (smew) LC
  - Genus Lophodytes Reichenbach 1853
    - †Lophodytes floridanus (Shufeldt 1917)
    - Lophodytes cucullatus (Linnaeus 1758) (hooded merganser) LC
  - Genus Mergus Linnaeus 1758 non Brisson 1760
    - †Mergus connectens Jánossy 1972
    - †Mergus minor Kessler 2009
    - †Mergus miscellus Alvarez & Olson 1978
    - Subgenus †(Promergus) Mathews & Iredale 1913
      - †Mergus australis Hombron & Jacquinot 1841 (Auckland merganser) EX 1910
    - Subgenus (Prister) Heine & Reichenow 1890
      - Mergus octosetaceus Vieillot 1817 (Brazilian merganser) CR C2a(i)
    - Subgenus (Mergus) Linnaeus 1758
      - Mergus serrator Linnaeus 1758 (red-brested merganser) LC
      - Mergus squamatus Gould 1864 (scaly-sided merganser) EN C2a(ii)
      - Mergus merganser Linnaeus 1758 (goosander) LC
        - M. m. americanus Cassin 1852 (American goosander)
        - M. m. merganser Linnaeus 1758 (Eurasian goosander)
        - M. m. orientalis Gould 1845 (Oriental goosander)
- Tribe Cairinini von Boetticher 1936-38
  - Cairina Fleming 1822
    - Cairina moschata (Linnaeus 1758) Fleming 1822 (Muscovy duck) LC
  - Aix Boie 1828
    - †Aix praeclara Zelenkov & Kuročkin 2012
    - Aix sponsa (Linnaeus 1758) (wood duck) LC
    - Aix galericulata (Linnaeus 1758) (mandarin duck) LC
- Tribe Callonettini Verheyen 1953
  - Genus Callonetta Delacour 1936
    - †Callonetta talarae (Campbell 1979)
    - Callonetta leucophrys (Vieillot 1816) (ringed teal) LC
- Clade
  - Genus Salvadorina Rothschild & Hartert 1894
    - Salvadorina waigiuensis Rothschild & Hartert 1894 (Salvadori's teal) VU C2a(ii)
- Tribe Aythyini Delacour & Mayr 1945
  - Genus †Nogusunna conflictoides Zelenkov 2011
    - Nogusunna conflictoides Zelenkov 2011
  - Genus †Protomelanitta Zelenkov 2011
    - †Protomelanitta bakeri Stidham & Zelenkov 2016
    - †Protomelanitta gracilis Zelenkov 2011
    - †Protomelanitta shihuibas (Hou 1985) Zelenkov 2012
  - Genus †Sharganetta mongolica Zelenkov 2011
    - †Sharganetta mongolica Zelenkov 2011
  - Genus Chenonetta von Brandt 1836
    - Chenonetta jubata (Latham 1801) (maned duck) LC
    - †Chenonetta finschi (Van Beneden 1875) Worthy & Olson 2002 (Finsch's duck) EX c. 1760
  - Genus Hymenolaimus Gray 1843
    - Hymenolaimus malacorhynchus (Gmelin 1789) (blue duck) EN C2a(i)
  - Genus Sarkidiornis Eyton 1838
    - Sarkidiornis sylvicola von Ihering & von Ihering 1907 (American comb-duck) LC
    - Sarkidiornis melanotos (Pennant 1769) (African comb-duck) LC
  - Genus Pteronetta Salvadori 1895
    - Pteronetta hartlaubii (Cassin 1860) (Hartlaub's duck) LC
  - Genus Cyanochen Bonaparte 1856
    - Cyanochen cyanoptera (Rüppell 1845) (blue-winged goose) VU C2a(ii)
  - Genus Marmaronetta Reichenbach 1853
    - Marmaronetta angustirostris (Ménétries 1832) (marbled duck) VU A2cd+3 cd+4 cd
  - Genus Asarcornis Salvadori 1895
    - Asarcornis scutulata (Müller 1842) (white-winged duck) EN A2cd+3 cd+4 cd;C2a(i)
  - Genus Netta Kaup 1829
    - Netta rufina (Pallas 1773) (red-crested pochard) LC
    - Netta caryophyllacea (Latham 1790) (pink-headed duck) CR D
  - Genus Metopiana Bonaparte 1856
    - Metopiana peposaca (Vieillot 1816) (rosy-billed pochard) LC
    - Metopiana erythrophthalma (southern pochard) LC
      - M. e. brunnea (African southern pochard)
      - M. e. erythrophthalma (South American southern pochard)
  - Genus Aythya Boie 1822
    - Phylogeny of Aythya
      - - (Nyroca)
          - ?A. baeri
          - ?A. innotata
          - A. nyroca
          - A. australis
        - - (Aristonetta)
            - A. americana
            - - A. ferina
              - A. valisineria
          - (Aythya)
            - - ?A. novaeseelandiae
              - ?A. collaris
              - A. fuligula
            - - A. affinis
              - A. marila
    - †Aythya chauvirae Cheneval 1987
    - †Aythya denesi (Kessler 2013) Zelenkov 2016
    - †Aythya effodiata (DeVis 1905)
    - †Aythya magna Kuročkin 1985
    - †Aythya molesta (Kuročkin 1985) Zelenkov 1985
    - †Aythya reclusa (DeVis 1888)
    - †Aythya robusta (DeVis 1888)
    - †Aythya spatiosa Kuročkin 1976
    - †Aythya cf. innotata (Réunion pochard)
    - Subgenus (Nyroca) Fleming 1822
      - Aythya baeri (Radde 1863) (Baer's pochard) CR A2cd+3 cd+4 cd; C2a(ii)
      - Aythya innotata (Salvadori 1894) (Madagascar pochard) CR D
      - Aythya nyroca (Güldenstädt 1769) (ferruginous duck) NT
      - Aythya australis (Eyton 1838) (hardhead) LC
        - A. a. extima Mayr 1940 (Banks Island hardhead)
        - A. a. australis (Eyton 1838) (Australasian hardhead)
    - Subgenus (Aristonetta) Baird 1858
      - Aythya americana (Eyton 1838) (redhead) LC
      - Aythya ferina (Linnaeus 1758) (common pochard) VU A2ab+3b+4ab
      - Aythya valisineria (Wilson 1814) (canvasback) LC
    - Subgenus (Aythya) Boie 1822
      - Aythya novaeseelandiae (Gmelin 1789) (New Zealand scaup) LC
      - Aythya collaris (Donovan 1809) (ring-necked duck) LC
      - Aythya fuligula (Linnaeus 1758) (tufted duck) LC
      - Aythya affinis (Eyton 1838) (lesser scaup) LC
      - Aythya marila (Linnaeus 1761) (greater scaup) LC
        - A. m. marila (Linnaeus 1761) (Eurasian greater scaup)
        - A. m. nearctica Stejneger 1885 (American greater scaup)
- Tribe Anatini Leach 1820
  - Genus †Bambolinetta Mayr & Pavia 2014
    - †Bambolinetta lignitifila (Portis 1884) Mayr & Pavia 2014
  - Genus †Heteroanser Zelenkov 2012
    - †Heteroanser vicinus (Kuročkin 1976) Zelenkov 2012
  - Genus †Matanas Worthy et al., 2007
    - †Matanas enrighti Worthy et al., 2007 (Enright's ducks)
  - Genus †Sinanas Yeh 1980
    - †Sinanas diatomas Yeh 1980
  - Genus †Talpanas Olson & James 2009 (Kaua'i mole duck)
    - †Talpanas lippa Olson & James 2009 (Kaua'i mole duck)
  - Genus †Wasonaka Howard 1966
    - †Wasonaka yepomerae Howard 1966
  - Subtribe †Thambetochenina (moa-nalos)
    - Genus †Chelychelynechen Olson & James 1991
      - †Chelychelynechen quassus Olson & James 1991 (turtle-jawed moa-nalos)
    - Genus †Ptaiochen Olson & James 1991
      - †Ptaiochen pau Olson & James 1991 (small-billed moa-nalos)
    - Genus †Thambetochen Olson & Wetmore 1976 (large-billed moa-nalos)
      - †Thambetochen chauliodous Olson & Wetmore 1976 (Maui Nui large-billed moa-nalo)
      - †Thambetochen xanion Olson & James 1991 (O'ahu moa-nalo)
  - Subtribe Anatina Vigors 1825
    - Genus Lophonetta Riley 1914
      - Lophonetta specularioides (King 1828) (crested duck) LC
        - L. s. alticola (Ménégaux 1909) (Andean crested duck)
        - L. s. specularioides (King 1828) (Patagonian crested duck)
    - Genus Speculanas von Boetticher 1929
      - Speculanas specularis (King 1828) (spectacled duck) NT
    - Genus Amazonetta von Boetticher 1929
      - Amazonetta brasiliensis (Gmelin 1789)(Brazilian teal) LC
        - A. b. brasiliensis (Gmelin 1789) (Lesser Brazilian teal)
        - A. b. ipecutiri (Vieillot 1816) (Greater Brazilian teal)
    - Genus Tachyeres Owen 1875 (Steamer ducks)
      - Phylogeny of Tachyeres
        - - T. brachypterus
          - - T. pteneres
            - - T. leucocephalus
              - T. patachonicus
      - Tachyeres patachonicus (King 1831) (flying steamerduck) LC
      - Tachyeres leucocephalus (Latham 1790) (white-headed steamerduck) VU C2a(ii)
      - Tachyeres pteneres (Forster 1844) (Magellanic steamerduck) LC
      - Tachyeres brachypterus (Latham 1790) (Falkland steamerduck) LC
    - Genus Sibirionetta
      - Sibirionetta formosa (Georgi 1775) (Baikal teal) LC
    - Genus Spatula Boie 1822
      - Phylogeny of Spatula
        - - - (Querquedula)
              S. querquedula
            - (Punanetta)
              - S. hottentota
              - - S. puna
                - S. versicolor
          - (Spatula)
            - S. platalea
            - - - S. discors
                - S. cyanoptera
              - - S. smithii
                - - S. clypeata
                  - S. rhynchotis
      - Subgenus (Querquedula) Stephens 1824
        - †Spatula pullulans (Brodkorb 1961)
        - Spatula querquedula (Linnaeus 1758) (garganey) LC
      - Subgenus (Punanetta) Bonaparte 1856
        - Spatula hottentota (Eyton 1838) (blue-billed teal) LC
        - Spatula puna (Lichtenstein) Tschudi 1844 (puna teal) LC
        - Spatula versicolor Vieillot 1816 (silver teal) LC
          - S. v. fretensis King 1831 (southern silver teal)
          - S. v. versicolor Vieillot 1816 (northern silver teal)
      - Subgenus (Spatula) Boie 1822
        - Spatula platalea Vieillot 1816 (red shoveler) LC
        - Spatula discors Linnaeus 1766 (blue-winged teal) LC
        - Spatula cyanoptera Vieillot 1816 (cinnamon teal) LC
          - S. c. septentrionalium Snyder & Lumsden 1951 (northern cinnamon teal)
          - S. c. tropica Snyder & Lumsden 1951 (tropical cinnamon teal)
          - †S. c. borreroi Snyder & Lumsden 1951 (Borrero's cinnamon teal)
          - S. c. orinoma (Oberholser 1906) (Andean cinnamon teal)
          - S. c. cyanoptera Vieillot 1816 (Argentine cinnamon teal)
        - Spatula smithii (Hartert 1891) (Cape shoveler) LC
        - Spatula clypeata (Linnaeus 1758) (northern shoveler) LC
        - Spatula rhynchotis Latham 1801 (Australian shoveler) LC
          - S. r. variegata (Gould 1856) (New Zealand shoveler)
          - S. r. rhynchotis Latham 1801 (Australian shoveler)
    - Genus Mareca Stephens 1824
      - Phylogeny of Mareca
        - - - (Eunetta)
              M. falcata
            - (Chaulelasmus)
              M. strepera
          - (Mareca)
            - M. penelope
            - - M. sibilatrix
              - M. americana
      - Subgenus (Eunetta) Bonaparte 1856
        - Mareca falcata (Georgi 1775) (falcated duck) NT
      - Subgenus (Chaulelasmus) Bonaparte 1838
        - Mareca strepera (Linnaeus 1758) (gadwall) LC
          - †M. s. couesi (Streets 1876) (Coues'/Washington Island gadwall)
          - M. s. strepera (Linnaeus 1758) (Holarctic gadwall)
      - Subgenus (Mareca) Stephens 1824 (Widgeons)
        - †Mareca marecula (Olson & Jouventin 1996) (Amsterdam Island widgeon, ?Saint Paul Island duck) EX 1793
        - Mareca penelope (Linnaeus 1758) (Eurasian wigeon) LC
        - Mareca americana (Gmelin 1789) (American wigeon) LC
        - Mareca sibilatrix (Poeppig 1829) (Chiloe wigeon) LC
    - Genus Anas Linnaeus 1758
      - Phylogeny of Mareca
        - - (Anas)
            - A. sparsa
            - - - A. melleri
                - A. undulata
              - - - - A. laysanensis
                    - A. wyvilliana
                  - - A. luzonica
                    - A. superciliosa
                - - A. poecilorhyncha
                  - - - A. zonorhyncha
                      - A. platyrhynchos
                    - - A. rubripes
                      - ?A. diazi
                      - A. fulvigula
          - - (Dafilonettion)
              - A. crecca
              - - A. carolinensis
                - - A. flavirostris
                  - A. andium
            - - (Dafila)
                - A. capensis
                - - A. bahamensis
                  - - A. erythrorhyncha
                    - - A. georgica
                      - - A. acuta
                        - A. eatoni
              - - (Virago)
                  - A. castanea
                  - - ?A. albogularis
                    - ?A. gibberifrons
                    - A. gracilis
                - (Nesonetta)
                  - A. bernieri
                  - - A. chlorotis
                    - - A. aucklandica
                      - A. nesiotis
      - †Anas apscheronica Burchak-Abramovisch 1958
      - †Anas bunkeri (Wetmore 1944)
      - †Anas elapsa DeVis 1888 (Chinchilla Late Pleistocene of Condamine River, Australia)
      - †Anas gracilipes DeVis 1905 (Late Pleistocene of Australia)
      - †Anas itchtucknee McCoy 1963
      - †Anas kisatibiensis (Early Pliocene of Kisatibi, Georgia)
      - †Anas kurochkini Zelenkov & Panteleyev 2015
      - †Anas lambrechti (Spillman 1942)
      - †Anas moldovica (Late Pliocene of Tchichmiknaia, Moldova?Georgia?)
      - †Anas sansaniensis Milne-Edwards 1867
      - †Anas schneideri Emslie 1985
      - †Anas strenua DeVis 1905 (Late Pleistocene of Patteramordu, Australia)
      - Subgenus (Anas) Linnaeus 1758
        - †Anas pachyscelus Wetmore 1960 (Bermuda Islands flightless duck)
        - Anas sparsa Eyton 1838 (African black duck) LC
          - A. s. leucostigma Rüppell 1845 (pink-billed black duck)
          - A. s. sparsa Eyton 1838 (South African black duck)
        - Anas melleri Sclater 1865 (Meller's duck) EN C2a(ii)
        - Anas undulata Dubois 1839 (yellow-billed duck) LC
          - A. u. ruppelli Blyth 1855 (northern yellow-billed duck)
          - A. u. undulata Dubois 1839 (southern yellow-billed duck)
        - Anas laysanensis Rothschild 1892 (Laysan duck) CR B1ac(iv)
        - Anas wyvilliana Sclater 1878 (Hawaiian duck) EN B1ab(ii,iii,iv,v)
        - Anas luzonica Fraser 1839 (Philippine duck) VU A2bcd
        - Anas superciliosa Gmelin 1789 (Pacific black duck) LC
          - A. s. pelewensis Hartlaub & Finsch 1872 (Pacific Islands gray duck)
          - A. s. superciliosa Gmelin 1789 (Australasian grey duck)
        - †Anas oustaleti Salvadori 1894 (Mariana/Oustalet's mallard)
        - Anas poecilorhyncha Forster 178 (Indian spot-billed duck) LC
          - A. p. haringtoni (Oates 1907) (Burmese spot-billed duck)
          - A. p. poecilorhyncha Forster 1781 (Indian spot-billed duck)
        - Anas zonorhyncha Swinhoe 1866 (Chinese spot-billed duck) LC
        - Anas platyrhynchos Linnaeus 1758 (mallard) LC
          - A. p. conboschas Brehm 1831 (Greenland mallard)
          - A. p. platyrhynchos Linnaeus 1758 (European mallard)
        - Anas rubripes Brewster 1902 (American black duck) LC
        - Anas diazi Ridgway 1886 (Mexican mallard)
        - Anas fulvigula Ridgway 1874 (mottled duck) LC
          - A. f. maculosa Sennett 1889 (Gulf Coast mottled duck)
          - A. f. fulvigula Ridgway 1874 (Florida mottled duck)
      - Subgenus (Dafilonettion) Boetticher 1937
        - †Anas greeni (Brodkorb 1964)
        - †Anas ogallalae (Brodkorb 1962)
        - Anas crecca Linnaeus 1758 (common teal) LC
          - A. c. crecca Linnaeus 1758 (Eurasian teal)
          - A. c. nimia Friedmann 1948 (Aleutian common teal)
        - Anas carolinensis Gmelin 1789 (Green-winged teal)
        - Anas andium (Sclater & Salvin 1873) (Andean teal) LC
          - A. a. altipetens (Conover 1941) (Mérida teal)
          - A. a. andium (Sclater & Salvin 1873) (Andean teal)
        - Anas flavirostris Vieillot 1816 (yellow-billed teal) LC
          - A. f. oxyptera Meyen 1834 (Sharp-winged teal)
          - A. f. flavirostris Vieillot 1816 (Yellow-billed teal)
      - Subgenus (Dafila) Stephens 1824
        - †Anas cheuen Agnolín 2006
        - Anas capensis Gmelin 1789 (Cape teal) LC
        - Anas bahamensis Linnaeus 1758 (white-cheeked pintail) LC
          - A. b. galapagensis (Ridgway 1890) (Galapagos white-cheeked pintail)
          - A. b. bahamensis Linnaeus 1758 (lesser white-cheeked pintail)
          - A. b. rubrirostris Vieillot 1816 (greater white-cheeked pintail)
        - Anas erythrorhyncha Gmelin 1789 (red-billed teal) LC
        - Anas acuta Linnaeus 1758 (northern pintail) LC
        - Anas eatoni (Sharpe 1875) (southern pintail) VU
          - A. e. drygalskii Reichenow 1904 (Crozet Islands pintail)
          - A. e. eatoni (Sharpe 1875) (Kerguelen Islands pintail)
        - Anas georgica Gmelin 1789 (yellow-billed pintail) LC
          - A. g. georgica Gmelin 1789 (South Georgia pintail)
          - †A. g. niceforoi Wetmore & Borrero 1946 (Niceforo's pintail)
          - A. g. spinicauda Vieillot 1816 (Chilean yellow-billed pintail)
      - Subgenus (Virago) Newton 1872
        - Anas castanea (Eyton 1838) (chestnut teal) LC
        - Anas albogularis (Hume 1873) (Andaman teal) VU D1
        - Anas gibberifrons Müller 1842 (Sunda teal) NT
        - Anas gracilis Buller 1869 (grey teal) LC
          - †A. g. remissa Ripley 1942 (Rennell Island teal)
          - A. g. gracilis
      - Subgenus (Nesonetta) Gray 1844
        - †Anas cf. chlorotis (Macquarie Islands teal)
        - †Anas theodori (Mauritius duck) EX 1710
        - Anas bernieri (Hartlaub 1860) (Madagascar teal) EN C2a(ii)
        - †Anas chathamica (Oliver 1955) (Chatham Island duck/teal)
        - Anas chlorotis Gray 1845 (brown teal) NT
        - Anas aucklandica (Gray 1844) (Auckland teal) VU D1
        - Anas nesiotis (Fleming 1935) (Campbell teal) VU D
