= Speckled teal =

Speckled teal has been divided taxonomically into two species. It could refer to the following two species of waterfowl:

- Yellow-billed teal, Anas flavirostris
- Andean teal, Anas andium
