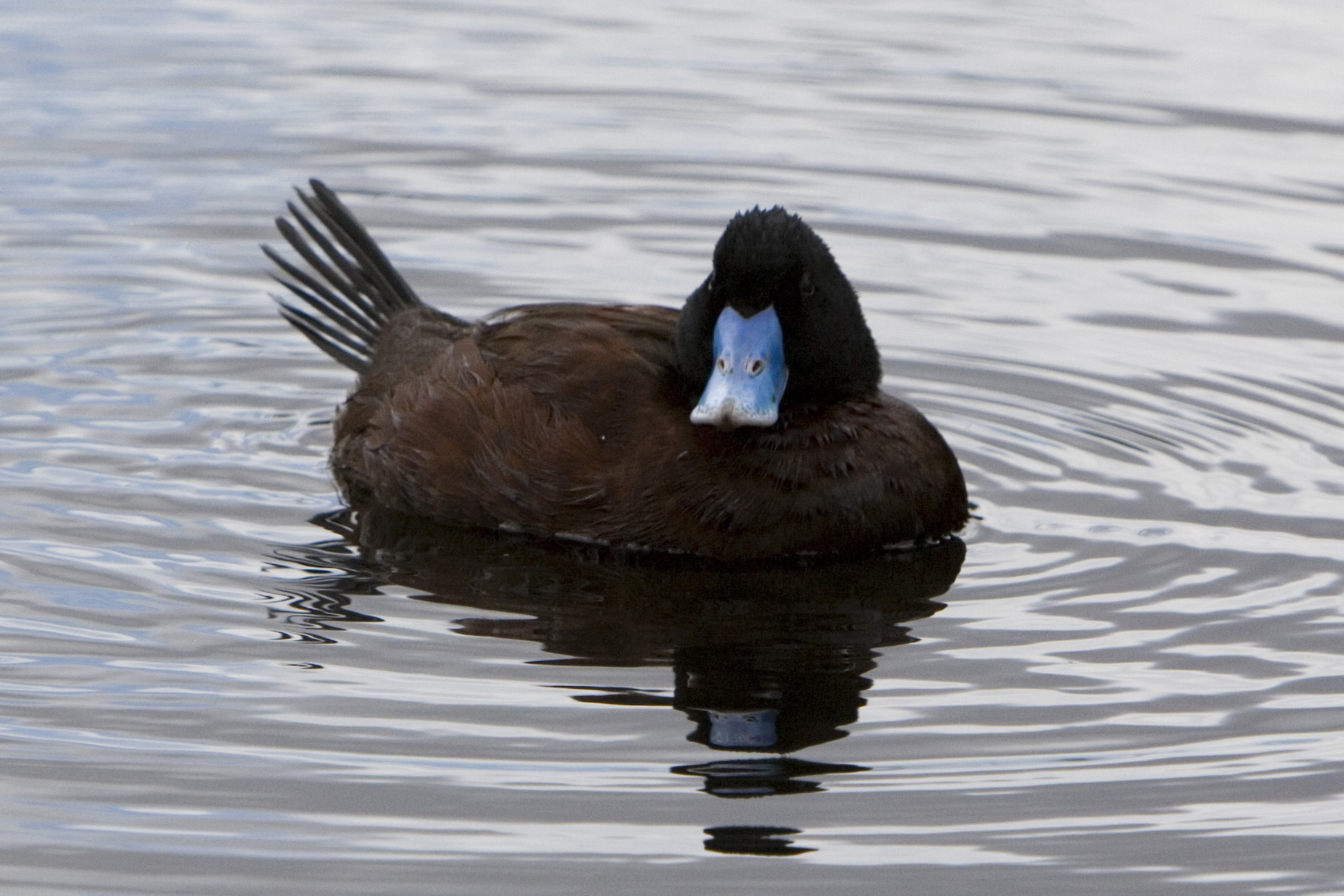
- Blue-billed duck (Oxyura australis)

Scientific classification
- Kingdom: Animalia
- Phylum: Chordata
- Class: Aves
- Order: Anseriformes
- Family: Anatidae
- Subfamily: Anatinae
- Tribe: Oxyurini; Swainson, 1831

Genera
- Oxyura; Nomonyx; Heteronetta

= Oxyurini =

Oxyurini Temporal range: Late Oligocene to present

Tribe of birds

The Oxyurini are a tribe of the duck subfamily of birds, the Anatinae. It has been subject of considerable debate about its validity and circumscription. Some taxonomic authorities place the group in its own subfamily, the Oxyurinae. Most of its members have long, stiff tail feathers which are erected when the bird is at rest, and relatively large, swollen bills. Though their relationships are still enigmatic, they appear to be closer to swans and true geese than to the typical ducks. The highest diversity is found in the warmer parts of the Americas, but at least one species occurs in a major part of the world.

Their habitus resembles a freshwater diving duck, particularly when moving on dry land. Their legs are set far back, making them awkward walkers, so they rarely leave the water. When at rest, their tails are a notable difference, and in the water they often swim very deep-set. Their unusual courtship displays involve drumming noises from inflatable throat sacs, head throwing, and erecting short crests. Most display singly with a very elaborate and peculiar display, but musk ducks congregate at leks and have a more limited display.

== Systematics ==
One mid-sized genus and two or three which are monotypic are described today:

Image	Genus	Living species
	Heteronetta Salvadori, 1866	black-headed duck (Heteronetta atricapilla)
	Nomonyx Ridgway, 1880	masked duck, Nomonyx dominicus
	Oxyura Bonaparte, 1828 – stiff-tailed ducks	Blue-billed duck, O. australis; †New Zealand stiff-tailed duck, O. vantetsi; Ruddy duck, O. jamaicensis; Andean duck, O. ferruginea; White-headed duck, O. leucocephala; Maccoa duck, O. maccoa; Lake duck, O. vittata

The black-headed duck of Heteronetta is indisputably quite basal, looking more like a typical duck-like Anatidae with a short tail and normal bill. The masked duck of Nomonyx has a more intermediate position; it probably diverged from the lineage leading to the main radiation some time after Heteronetta.

The musk ducks (Biziura), sometimes included in this group, are noted for their bizarre habitus and pronounced sexual dimorphism; they are of uncertain position and decidedly aberrant. Their anatomy is more similar to Oxyura than to the two less derived genera, but still unique in many respects. mtDNA cytochrome b sequence data suggest a closer relationship with the pink-eared ducks (Malacorhynchus) which if correct would represent one of the most drastic cases of divergent adaptation in the whole Anseriformes.

Altogether, however, the only thing that seems clear is that the musk ducks probably are not part of the stiff-tailed ducks in the strict sense, but rather represent a not-too-distantly related lineage that is highly convergent as regards their hind limb anatomy. These two are probably part of a very ancient radiation of Gondwanan (often Australian) waterfowl, including such forms as the Cape Barren goose (Cereopsis), the coscoroba swan (Coscoroba), the freckled duck (Stictonetta) which once was placed in the Oxyurinae, or the pygmy geese (Nettapus), but the exact relationships between these lineages remains unresolved. For example, the African white-backed duck (Thalassornis) also shows some similarities to Oxyura, but again, this may be yet another case of convergent evolution.

"Anas" luederitzensis from the Early Miocene of Namibia may be an early member of Oxyurini. Two Australian fossil genera of Oxyurini are Pinpanetta from the Oligocene and Tirarinetta from the Pliocene. Three enigmatic genera of waterfowl, Mionetta from the Late Oligocene to Middle Miocene of central Europe and Dunstanetta and Manuherikia from the Bathans Early/Middle Miocene of Otago, New Zealand, show some similarities to oxyurine ducks and judging from biogeography, the latter two may plausibly be related. However, Manuherikia and Mionetta are sometimes held to be Dendrocheninae adapted to diving, so closer to whistling ducks, a very ancient lineage of the Anatidae.
