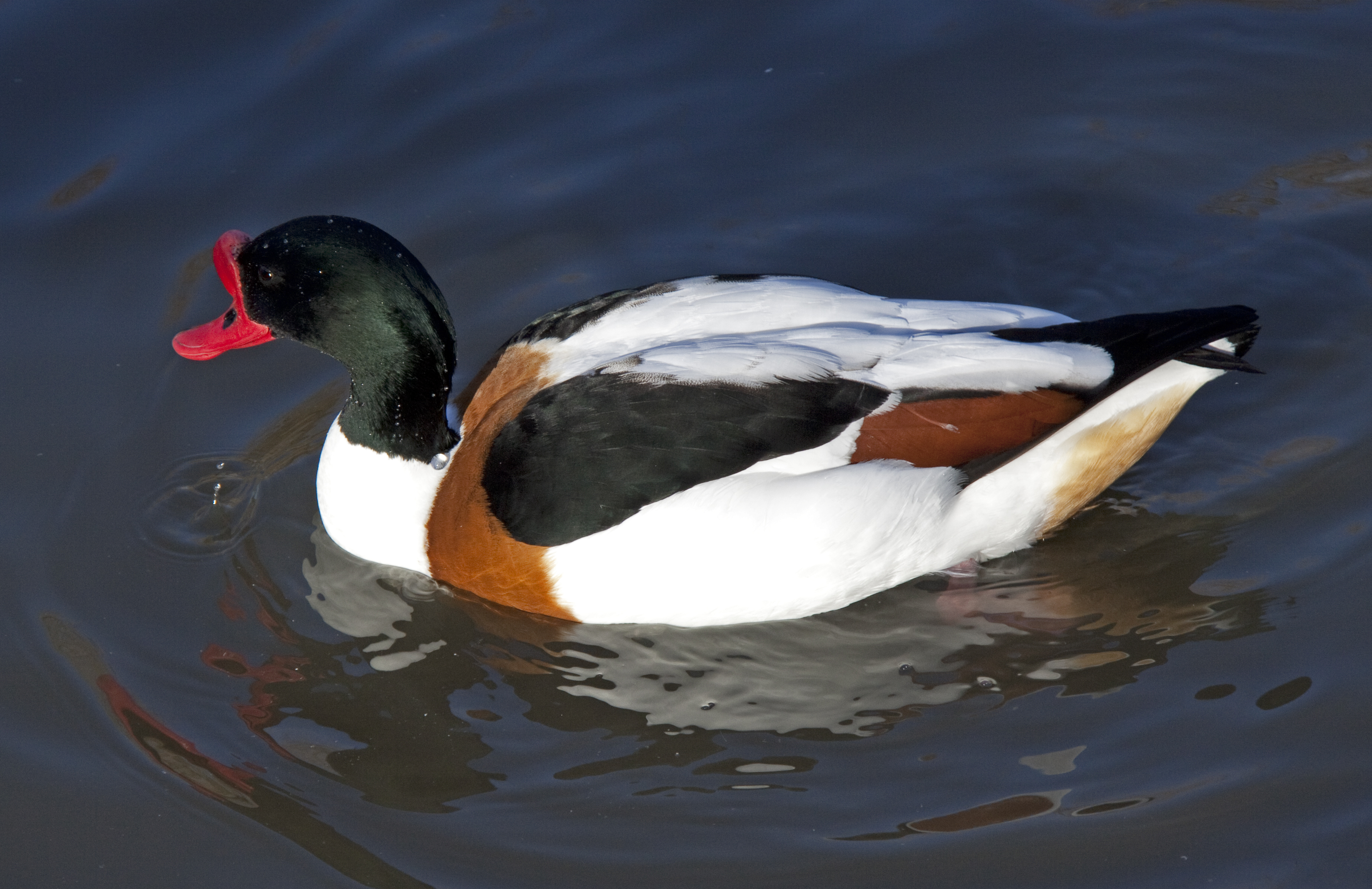
- Common shelduck (Tadorna tadorna)

Scientific classification
- Kingdom: Animalia
- Phylum: Chordata
- Class: Aves
- Order: Anseriformes
- Family: Anatidae
- Subfamily: Anatinae
- Tribe: Tadornini; Reichenbach, 1849

Genera
- See text

= Tadornini =

Subfamily of birds

The Tadornini is a biological tribe that includes the shelducks and sheldgeese, which is placed in subfamily Anatinae of family Anatidae, which includes the ducks and most duck-like waterfowl such as the geese and swans. It has been treated as subfamily in the past.

This group is largely tropical or Southern Hemisphere in distribution, with only two species, the common shelduck and the ruddy shelduck breeding in northern temperate regions, though the crested shelduck (presumed extinct) was also a northern species. The Egyptian goose has been introduced in several northern regions.

Most of these species have a distinctive plumage, but there is no pattern as to whether the sexes are alike, even within a single genus.

== Systematics ==
Following the review of Livezey (1986), several species formerly classified as aberrant dabbling ducks or as "perching ducks" were placed in the Tadornini. mtDNA sequence analyses cast doubt on the allocation of several genera; many supposed dabbling ducks and one peculiar goose may more correctly belong here, while some genera believed to be close to shelducks appear to have different relationships altogether.

The available data indicates that the Tadornini are indeed, as their appearance suggests, somewhat intermediate between geese and dabbling ducks, but the molecular data suggests they are not the only lineage to evolve towards a more duck-like morphology, with the diving ducks and seaducks being more distant.

Tribe Tadornini

- Unequivocally placed in this group:
  - Tadorna: shelducks (Europe, Africa, Australasia; 6 species) – possibly paraphyletic
  - Radjah: Radjah shelduck (Australia, New Guinea)
  - Centrornis: Malagasy sheldgoose (Madagascar, prehistoric)
  - Alopochen: Egyptian goose, and extinct African and Mascarene shelducks (Africa and Madagascar region; 1 living species, 2–3 extinct)
  - Neochen: Orinoco goose (South America)
  - Chloephaga: sheldgeese (South America; 5 species)
  - Hymenolaimus: blue duck (New Zealand) – formerly in "perching ducks"
  - Merganetta: torrent duck (Andes mountains, South America) – formerly in "perching ducks"
- Provisionally placed in this group:
  - Malacorhynchus: pink-eared ducks (Australia; 1 living species, 1 prehistoric) – may be closer to Oxyurinae
  - Cyanochen: blue-winged goose (Ethiopia) – may belong to a distinct subfamily
  - Tachyeres: steamer ducks (South America; 4 species) – may belong to Anatinae
  - Plectropterus: spur-winged goose (sub-Saharan Africa) – may be in monotypic subfamily
- May belong to Tadorninae, currently placed elsewhere:
  - Aix: Mandarin duck and wood duck (East Asia and North America, respectively)
  - Cairina moschata: Muscovy duck (tropical America; genus Cairina may be paraphyletic)
  - Cereopsis: Cape Barren goose (Australia)
  - Callonetta: ringed teal (South America)
  - Chenonetta: maned duck (Australia and formerly New Zealand; 1 living species, 1 extinct)
  - Salvadorina: Salvadori's teal (New Guinea) – formerly in Anatidae and "perching ducks"
