= Australotadorna =

Australotadorna alecwilsoni Temporal range: Late Oligocene, 26–24 Ma

Scientific classification
- Kingdom: Animalia
- Phylum: Chordata
- Class: Aves
- Order: Anseriformes
- Family: Anatidae
- Genus: †Australotadorna; Worthy, 2009
- Species: †A. alecwilsoni

Binomial name
- †Australotadorna alecwilsoni Worthy, 2009

Extinct genus of birds

Australotadorna alecwilsoni is an extinct genus and species of bird, in the shelduck subfamily of the duck family, from the Late Oligocene of central Australia. The genus name comes from the Latin australis ("southern" or, derivatively, "Australian") and Tadorna (a genus of shelducks). The specific epithet honours Alec Wilson, pastoral lease holder of Frome Downs Station, who supported palaeontological access to, and investigation of, fossil sites on his property. The type locality is Lake Pinpa in the Lake Eyre Basin of north-eastern South Australia.
