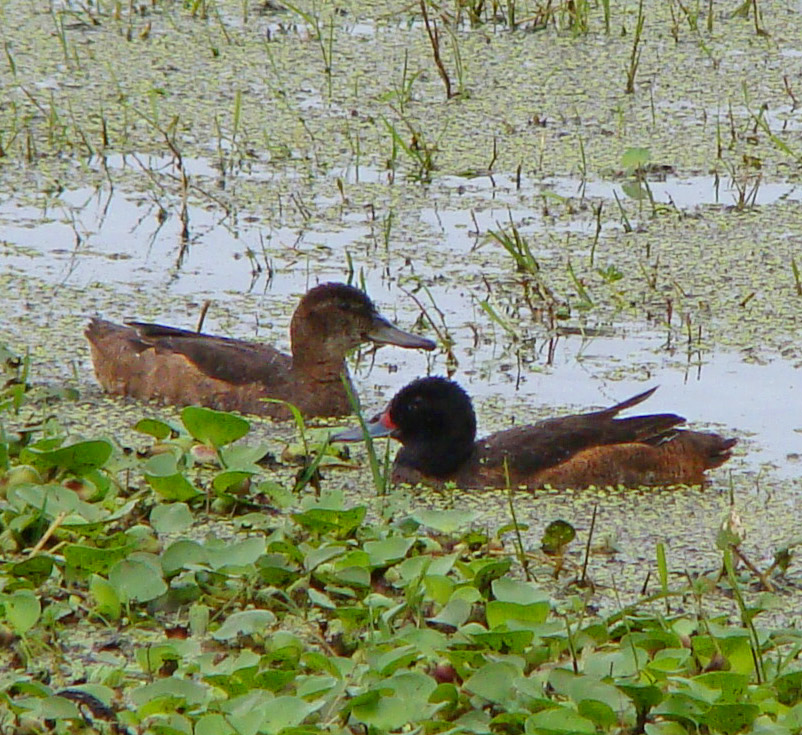
- Pair (male with black head)

Conservation status
- Least Concern (IUCN 3.1)

Scientific classification
- Kingdom: Animalia
- Phylum: Chordata
- Class: Aves
- Order: Anseriformes
- Family: Anatidae
- Genus: Heteronetta; Salvadori, 1866
- Species: H. atricapilla

Binomial name
- Heteronetta atricapilla (Merrem, 1841)
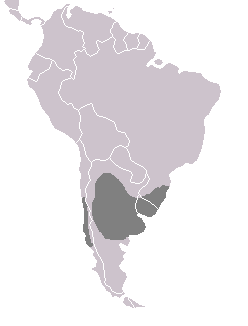
- Range of black-headed duck

= Black-headed duck =

Species of bird

The black-headed duck (Heteronetta atricapilla) is a South American duck in subfamily Oxyurinae of family Anatidae. It is found in Argentina, Bolivia, Brazil, Chile, Paraguay, and Uruguay.

== Taxonomy and systematics ==
The black-headed duck is the only member of genus Heteronetta and has no subspecies. It is closely related to the "stiff-tailed" ducks of genera Nomonyx, Oxyura, and Biziura.

== Description ==
The black-headed duck is the most basal living member of its subfamily, and it lacks the stiff tail and swollen bill of its relatives. Overall much resembling a fairly typical diving duck, its plumage and other peculiarities indicate it may not be a very close relative of the other stiff-tailed ducks, but rather the product of convergent evolution from the ancestors of the stiff-tailed ducks.

The black-headed duck is about 35 cm (14 in) long. Males weigh an average of about 510 g (18 oz) and females 565 g (20 oz). The species has a distinctive shape, with a long body and disproportionately short wings. Its bill has a black maxilla and an orange mandible; the maxilla has a rosy patch at its base during the breeding season. Adult males have a glossy black head and upper neck and a white chin. Their upperparts are deep brownish black with cinnamon or pale rufous speckles and vermiculation. The folded wing shows two white bars. Their underparts are whitish with brown mottling and appear silvery. Adult females have a dark brown head and neck and a whitish throat, and are otherwise like the male. Immature birds are similar to the female but have more rufous upperparts, more yellowish underparts, and a pale eye stripe.

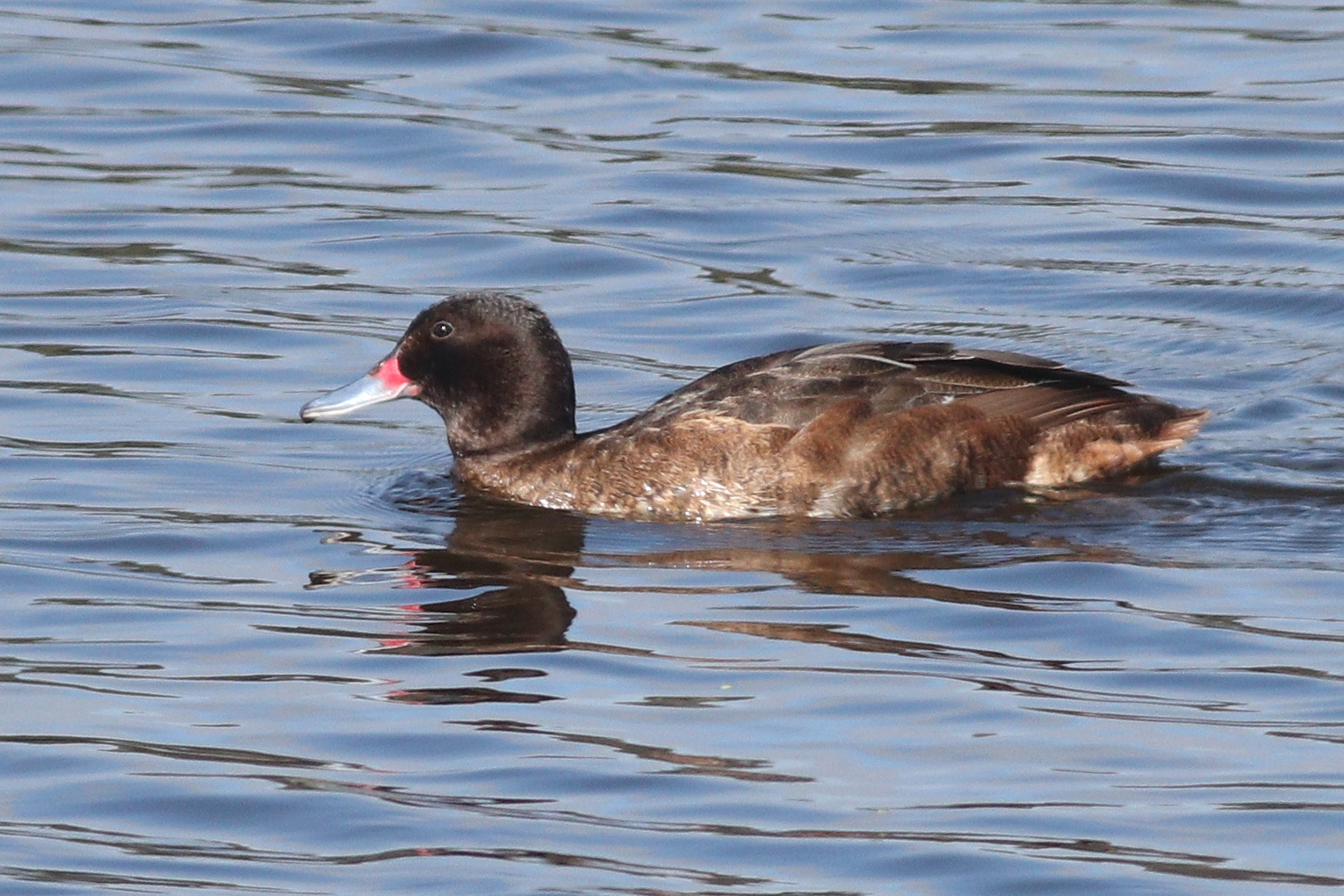
Male

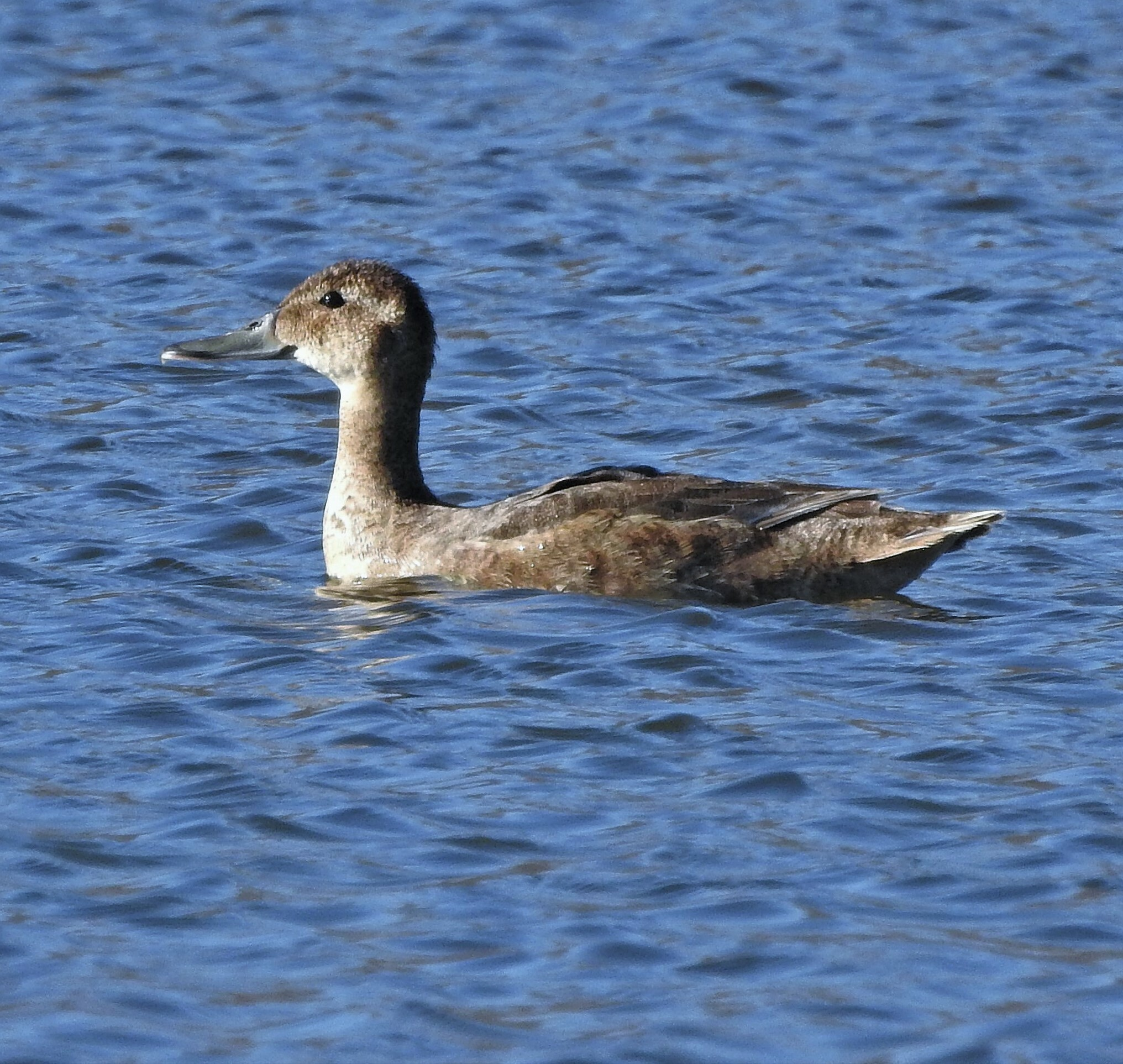
Female

== Distribution and habitat ==
The black-headed duck has two separate ranges. One is the western side of central Chile. The other is from extreme southern Bolivia south through central Paraguay to central Argentina and east through southern Uruguay into southernmost Brazil. Undocumented sight records in the Falkland Islands lead the South American Classification Committee of the American Ornithological Society to treat it as hypothetical there. It mostly inhabits freshwater marshes whose dominant plant is the sedge Scirpus californicus, and outside the breeding season may be found in lakes, water-filled ditches, and sometimes flooded fields.

== Behavior ==
=== Movement ===
The black-headed duck is partially migratory. It is a year-round resident in most of its range but is found in most of Paraguay and its small Bolivian range only in the non-breeding season.

=== Feeding ===
The black-headed duck feeds by diving. Though little information is available about its diet, a major component appears to be seeds of Scirpus californicus, and snails a minor component.

=== Breeding ===
The black-headed duck is unique among waterfowl; it is an obligate brood parasite. The female does not build a nest but lays its eggs in the nests of other birds. Known hosts include the rosy-billed pochard (Netta peposaca), the red-fronted coot (Fulica rufifrons), and the red-gartered coot (F. armillata). At least 18 other species have been reported as hosts, including several other waterfowl and rail/coot species, the brown-hooded gull (Chroicocephalus maculipennis), and a few raptors. Unlike some cuckoos, neither the chicks nor adults destroy the eggs or kill the chicks of the host. In contrast with brood parasitic passerines, whose young are altricial, black-headed duck ducklings are precocial. After an incubation of about 25 days, the ducklings are completely independent a few hours after hatching and leave the nest.

=== Vocalization ===
The black-headed duck is usually silent. It does give a low "quah quah" as part of a courtship display, and also "a two note grunt followed by a whistle: – gr-rump-freet." Females make "clucking notes."

== Status ==
The IUCN has assessed the black-headed duck as being of Least Concern. It has a large range, and though its population size is not known it is believed to be stable. No immediate threats have been identified. It may be "impacted by changes in available habitat."
