= Lavadytis =

Lavadytis Temporal range: Burdigalian–Langhian

Scientific classification
- Kingdom: Animalia
- Phylum: Chordata
- Class: Aves
- Order: Anseriformes
- Family: Anatidae
- Genus: †Lavadytis
- Species: †L. pyrenae

Binomial name
- †Lavadytis pyrenae Stidham and Hilton, 2015

Extinct genus of ducks

Lavadytis is an extinct genus of anatid birds that lived in what is now Nevada during the Middle Miocene Climatic Optimum of the Miocene epoch. It contains the single species Lavadytis pyrenae.

== Palaeobiology ==
=== Palaeoecology ===
Lavadytis pyrenae was osteologically adapted for diving, and it likely behaved in a similar manner and occupied a similar ecological niche to modern diving ducks.
