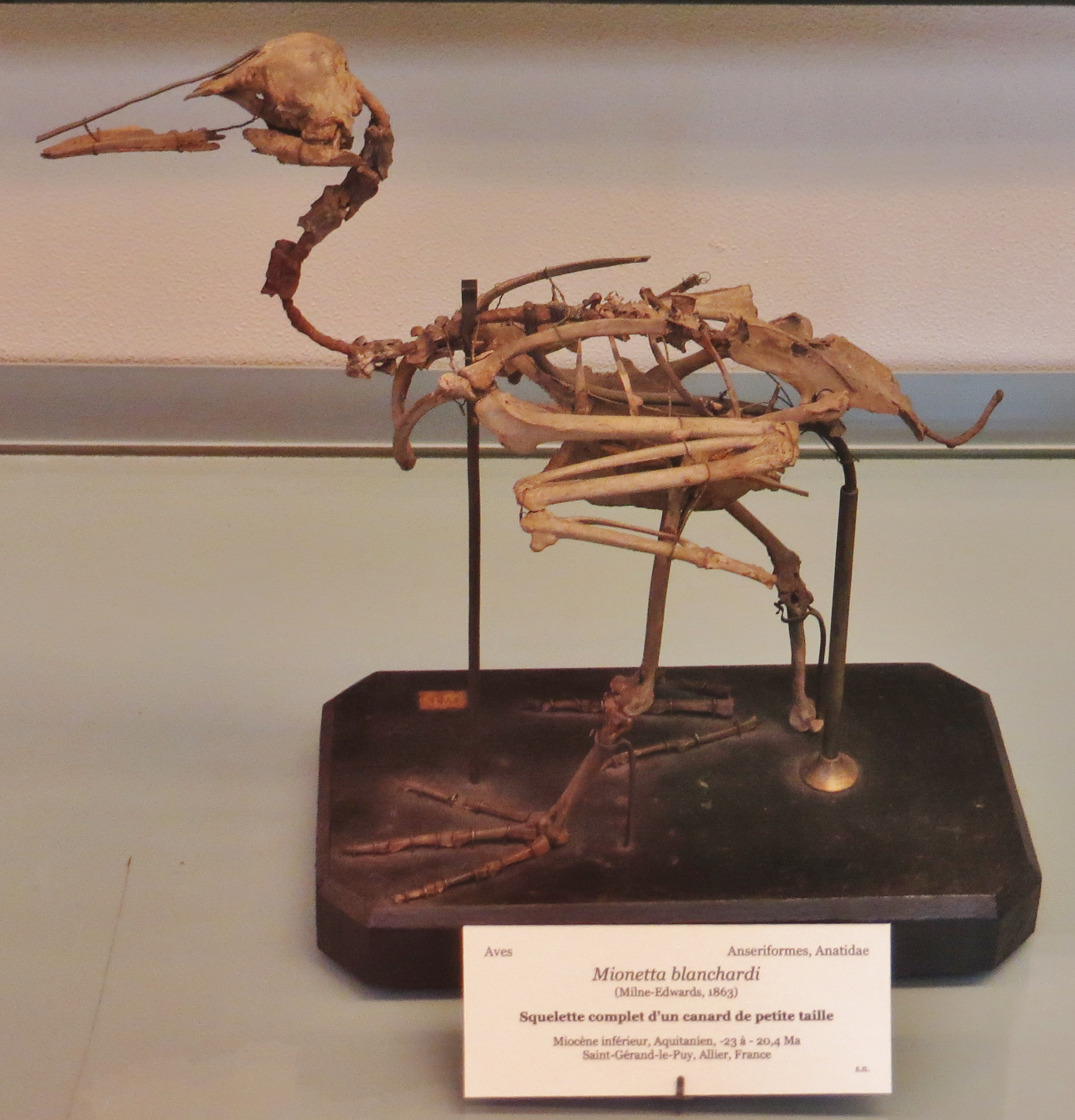
- Mounted skeleton of M. blanchardi, Museum Histoire Naturelle, Paris

Scientific classification
- Kingdom: Animalia
- Phylum: Chordata
- Class: Aves
- Order: Anseriformes
- Superfamily: Anatoidea
- Family: Anatidae
- Genus: †Mionetta; Livezey & Martin, 1988

Species
- M. blanchardi (Milne-Edwards, 1863); ?†M. consobrina (Milne-Edwards, 1868); ?†M. eversa; ?†M. natator (Milne-Edwards, 1867); ?†M. defossor

= Mionetta =

Mionetta Temporal range: Late Oligocene–Middle Miocene

Extinct genus of birds

Mionetta is an extinct genus of duck from the Late Oligocene to Middle Miocene of Western and Central Europe (France, Germany and the Czech Republic), and possibly also Central Asia (Kazakhstan). Many of the species were originally assigned to the genus Anas. It is among the best and earliest known fossil members of the family Anatidae, with the type species M. blanchardi known from thousands of specimens collected from the Early Miocene (Aquitanian) Saint-Gérand-le-Puy locality. Diagnostic characters include features of the humerus bone. In the original 1988 description of the genus it was placed as one of two genera in the extinct subfamily Dendrocheninae alongside Dendrochen. A 2008 study considered it to be a basal member of the subfamily Oxyurinae, while a 2022 study placed in a basal position in Anatidae outside the split between Oxyurinae, Anatinae and Anserinae, though more closely related to these subfamilies than to Dendrocygna.
