= Heteroanser =

Heteroanser Temporal range: Upper Miocene (Messinian), 5.8–5.3 Ma

Scientific classification
- Kingdom: Animalia
- Phylum: Chordata
- Class: Aves
- Order: Anseriformes
- Family: Anatidae
- Genus: †Heteroanser; Zelenkov, 2012
- Species: †H. vicinus

Binomial name
- †Heteroanser vicinus Kurochkin, 1976

Extinct genus of birds

Heteroanser is an extinct genus of geese, which lived during the Late Miocene in what is today Western Mongolia. Its remains were discovered in the upper subformation of the Hyargas Nuur Formation, on the northern shore of the Khyargas Nuur, in Uvs Province. This genus is known from a single and incomplete tarsometatarsus, which differs significantly from all other Neogene genera of anatinae.

== History and etymology ==
The holotype remains of Heteroanser, a fragmental right tarsometatarsus labelled PIN, no. 2614/110, was first described by Evgeny Kurochkin in 1976, as a new species within the genus Heterochen: H. vicinus. In 1986, this new species was transferred to the genus Anser by Mlíkovský and Švec, who considered it related to the modern bean goose. Finally, in 2012, a new genus, Heteroanser, was erected for the species by Nikita Zelenkov, making it Heteroanser vicinus.

The name of this genus comes from the Greek adjective heteros, meaning "other", and the Latin noun anser, meaning "goose".
