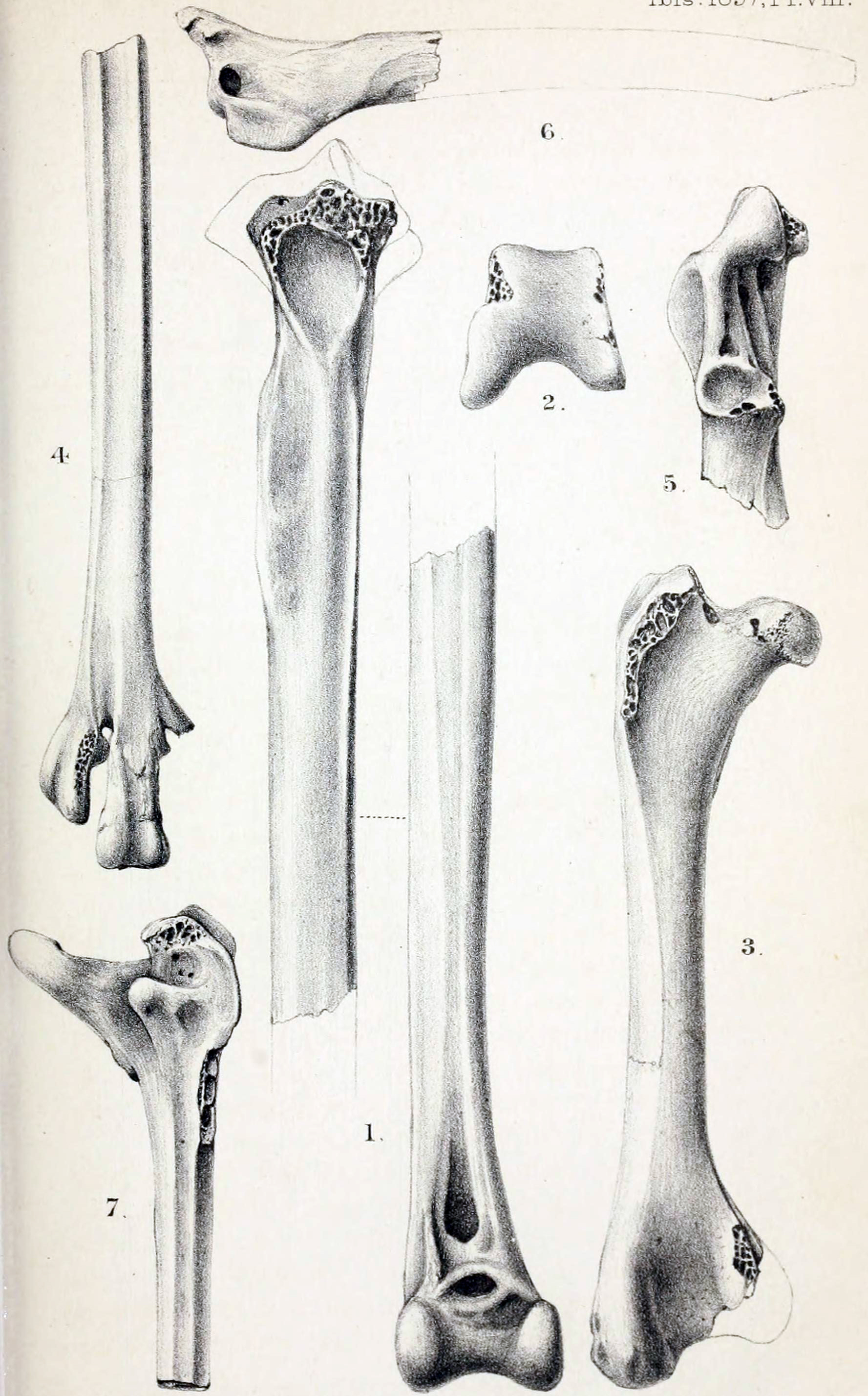
- Limb fossils

Scientific classification
- Domain: Eukaryota
- Kingdom: Animalia
- Phylum: Chordata
- Class: Aves
- Order: Anseriformes
- Family: Anatidae
- Genus: †Centrornis; Andrews, 1897
- Species: †C. majori

Binomial name
- †Centrornis majori Andrews, 1897

= Malagasy sheldgoose =

Malagasy sheldgoose Temporal range: Late Pleistocene

Extinct species of bird

The Malagasy sheldgoose (Centrornis majori) is an extinct monotypic species of large goose in the shelduck subfamily. It was described from subfossil remains radiocarbon dated to about 17,000 years ago, found in central Madagascar.
