= Saintandrea =

Saintandrea Temporal range: Late Oligocene

Scientific classification
- Kingdom: Animalia
- Phylum: Chordata
- Class: Aves
- Order: Anseriformes
- Family: Anatidae
- Genus: †Saintandrea; Mayr & De Pietri, 2013
- Species: †S. chenoides

Binomial name
- †Saintandrea chenoides Mayr & De Pietri, 2013

Extinct genus of birds

Saintandrea is an extinct genus of romainvilliine anseriform that lived during the Chattian stage of the Oligocene epoch.

== Distribution ==
Saintandrea chenoides inhabited France, its fossils having been found at the site of Saint-André.
