= Matanas =

Matanas enrighti Temporal range: Early Miocene 19–16 Ma

Scientific classification
- Kingdom: Animalia
- Phylum: Chordata
- Class: Aves
- Order: Anseriformes
- Family: Anatidae
- Genus: †Matanas; Worthy et al., 2007
- Species: †M. enrighti

Binomial name
- †Matanas enrighti Worthy et al., 2007

Extinct genus of birds

Matanas enrighti is an extinct duck from the Miocene of New Zealand. It was described from fossil material (a left humerus) collected from a Saint Bathans Fauna site near Mata Creek, in the lower Bannockburn Formation of the Manuherikia Group, in the Manuherikia River valley in the Central Otago region of the South Island.

== Name ==
The genus name is a combination of the name of Mata Creek with anas (“duck”). The specific epithet honours Jack Enright, owner of the station on which the type material was collected.
