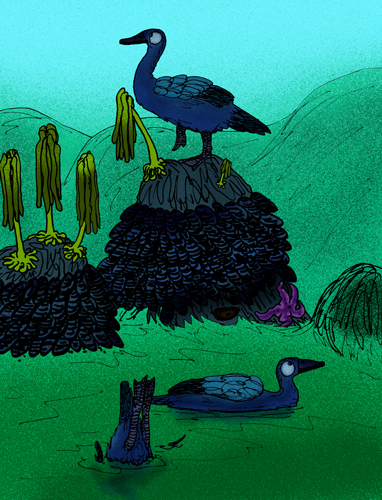
- Chendytes lawi

Scientific classification
- Kingdom: Animalia
- Phylum: Chordata
- Class: Aves
- Order: Anseriformes
- Family: Anatidae
- Genus: †Chendytes; Miller, 1925

Type species
- †Chendytes lawi Miller, 1925

Other species
- †Chendytes milleri Howard, 1955

= Chendytes =

Chendytes Temporal range: Early Pleistocene–Holocene

Extinct species of bird

Chendytes is a genus of extinct, goose-sized flightless marine duck, once common on the California coast, the California Channel Islands, and possibly southern Oregon. It lived in the Pleistocene and survived into the Holocene. It appears to have gone extinct at about 450–250 BCE. The youngest direct radiocarbon date from a Chendytes bone fragment dates to 770–400 BCE and was found in an archeological site in Ventura County. Its remains have been found in fossil deposits and in early coastal archeological sites. Archeological data from coastal California show a record of human exploitation of Chendytes lawi for at least 8,000 years. It was probably driven to extinction by hunting, animal predation, and loss of habitat. Chendytes bones have been identified in archaeological assemblages from 14 coastal sites, including two on San Miguel Island and 12 in mainland localities. Hundreds of Chendytes bones and egg shells found in Pleistocene deposits on San Miguel Island have been interpreted as evidence that some of these island fossil localities were nesting colonies, one of which Guthrie dated to about 12,000 14C years (about 13,500–13,000 calibrated years B.P.). There is nothing in the North American archaeological record indicating a span of exploitation for any megafaunal genus remotely as long as that of Chendytes.

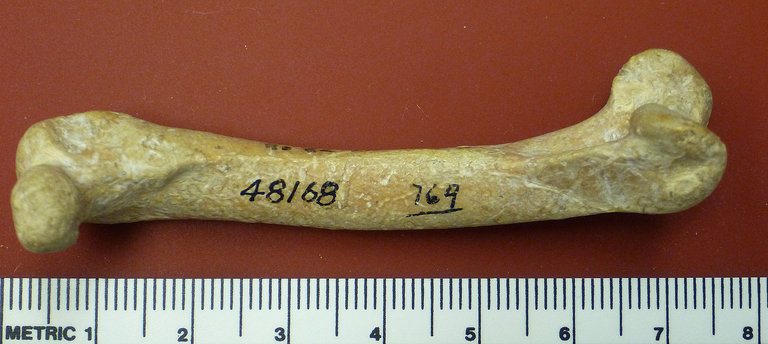
Fossil

Although originally thought to be a seaduck in the tribe Mergini, analysis of ancient DNA sequences suggests that it is a basal member and a sister to the clade of extant dabbling ducks in the tribe Anatini, revealing an additional example of convergent evolution of characters related to feeding behavior among ducks. It may also have borne a convergent resemblance to the steamer ducks of the genus Tachyeres.

Head and beak morphology suggest C. lawi ate invertebrates. Based on the large, robust morphology of the cervical vertebrae, skull, and bill, C. lawi specialized on sessile invertebrates and the species likely possessed "a remarkable ability to wrench off invertebrate animals attached to hard substrate".

Chendytes milleri is an extinct species of Chendytes from the Early Pleistocene. Its remains have been found on San Nicolas Island in the Channel Islands. C. milleri was named in honor of paleontologist Loye H. Miller, who first described the genus Chendytes. C. milleri is smaller than C. lawi and the wings of C. milleri had not degenerated as much as those of C. lawi.
