= Olor =

Device used to prevent goats from mating

An olor is a piece of cowhide or plastic tied onto a male goat like a skirt. It is used by Kenyan goatherders to prevent bucks from impregnating the female goats during times of drought.
