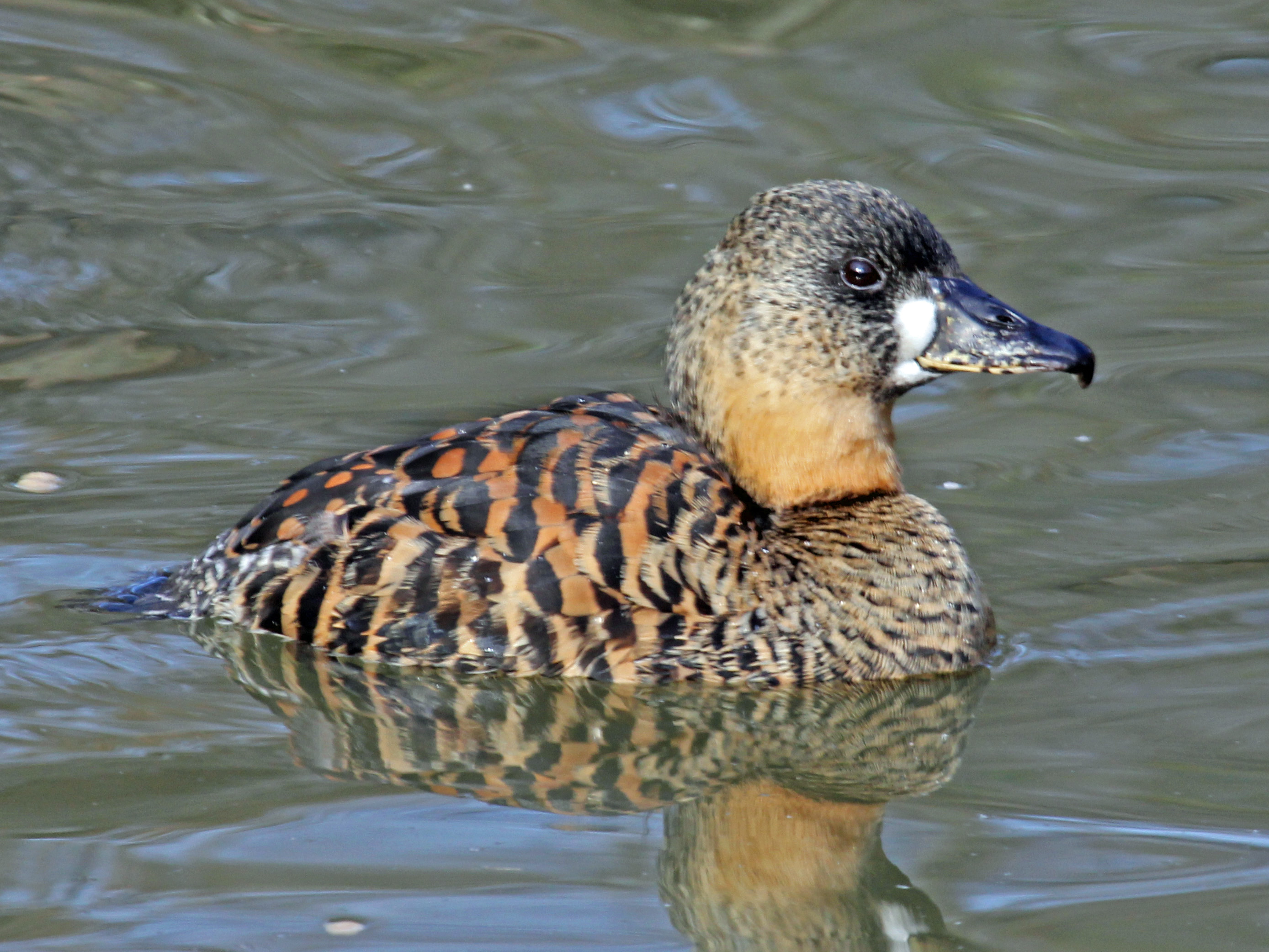

Conservation status
- Least Concern (IUCN 3.1)

Scientific classification
- Kingdom: Animalia
- Phylum: Chordata
- Class: Aves
- Order: Anseriformes
- Family: Anatidae
- Subfamily: Dendrocygninae; Livezey, 1986
- Genus: Thalassornis; Eyton, 1838
- Species: T. leuconotus

Binomial name
- Thalassornis leuconotus Eyton, 1838

Subspecies
- T. l. leuconotus (African white-backed duck) Eyton, 1838; T. l. insularis (Madagascar white-backed duck) Richmond, 1897

= White-backed duck =

Species of bird

The white-backed duck (Thalassornis leuconotus) is a waterbird of the family Anatidae. It is distinct from all other ducks, but most closely related to the whistling ducks in the subfamily Dendrocygninae, though also showing some similarities to the stiff-tailed ducks in the subfamily Oxyurinae. It is the only member of the genus Thalassornis.

== Description ==
These birds are well adapted for diving. On occasions they have been observed to stay under water for up to half a minute. They search especially for the bulbs of waterlilies, but also seeds and leaves of waterlilies and other water plants and the young feed on lake flies larvae as well. From danger, they also escape preferentially by diving; hence, the namesake white back is hardly visible in life.

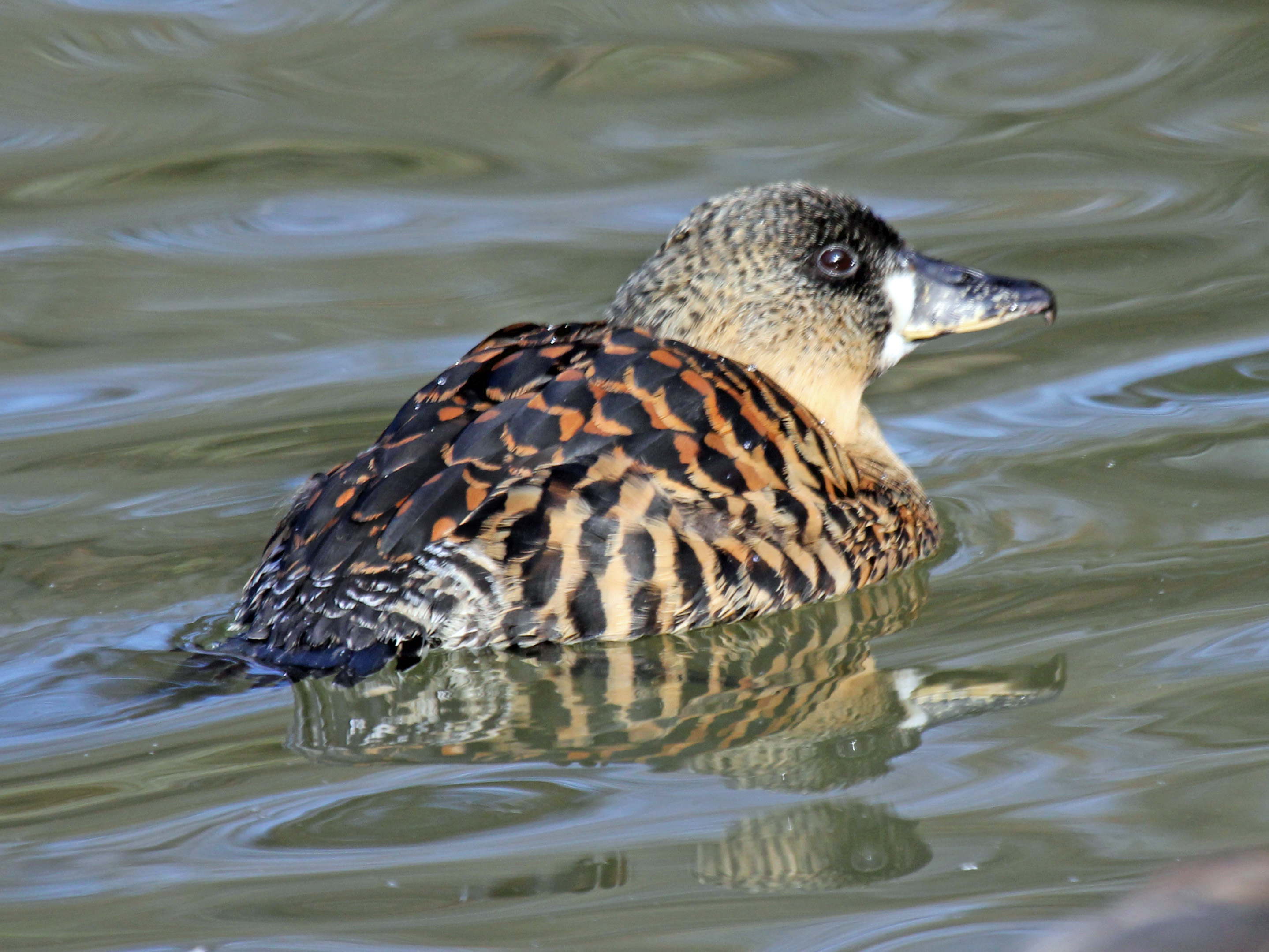

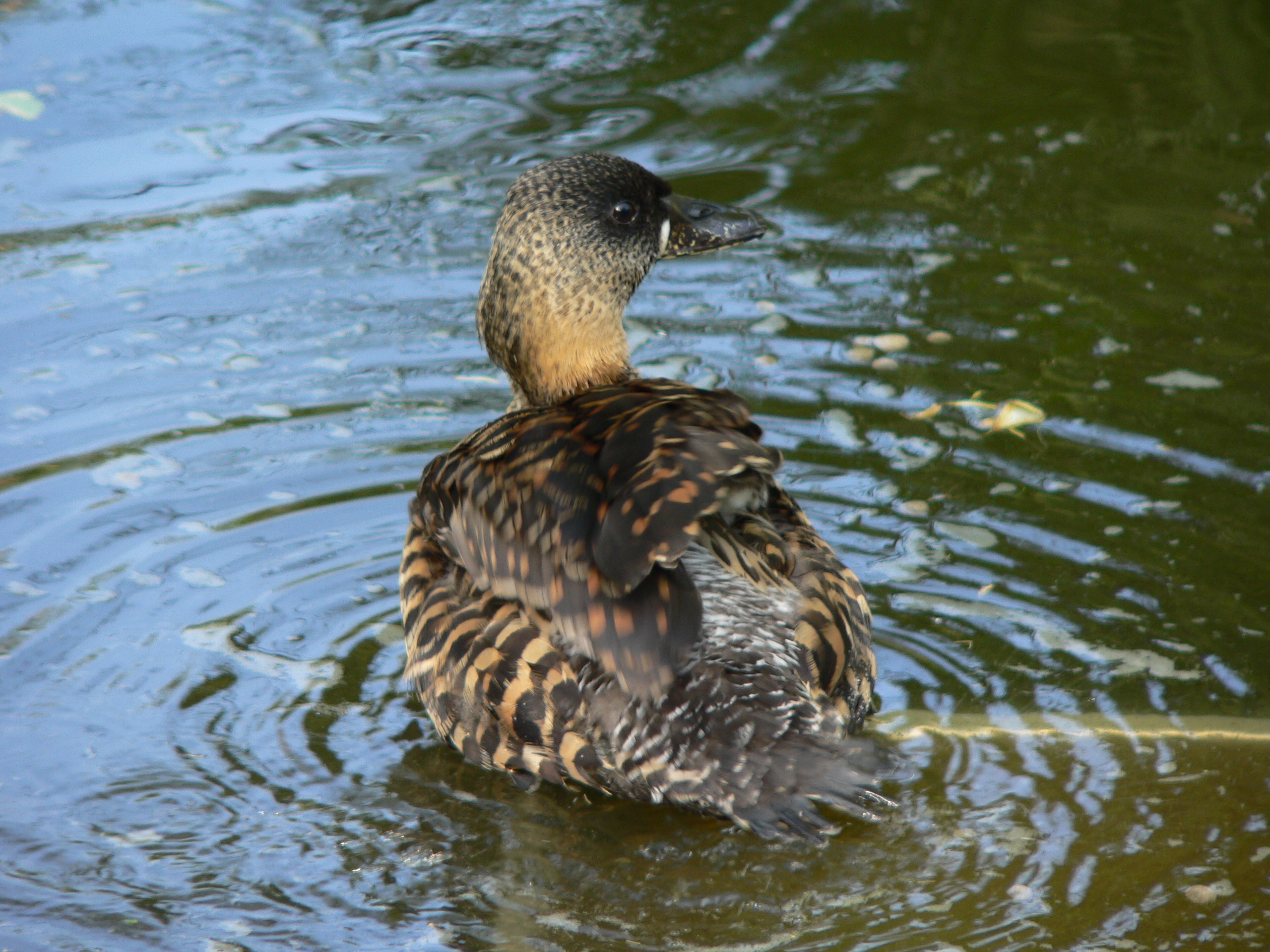

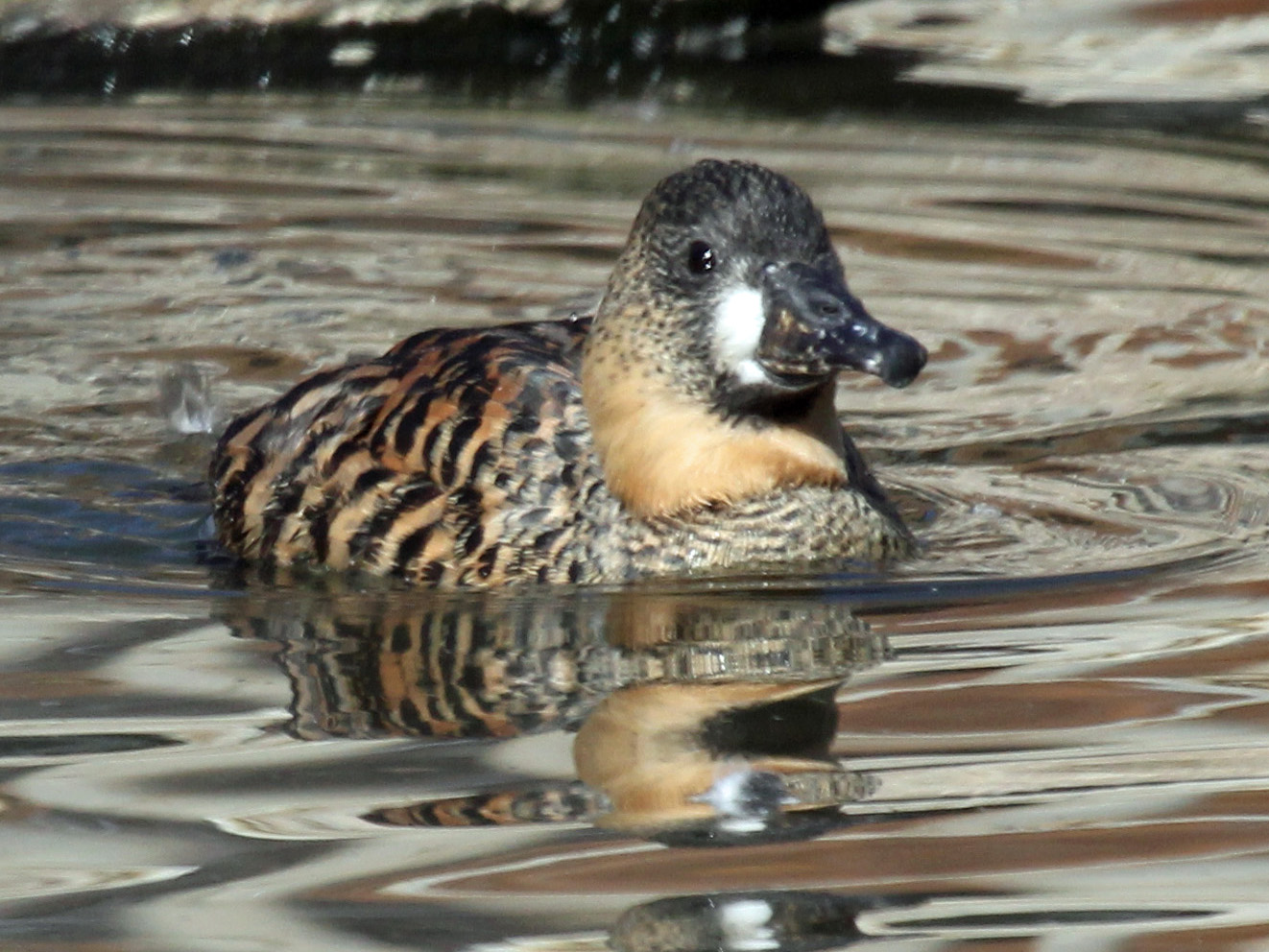

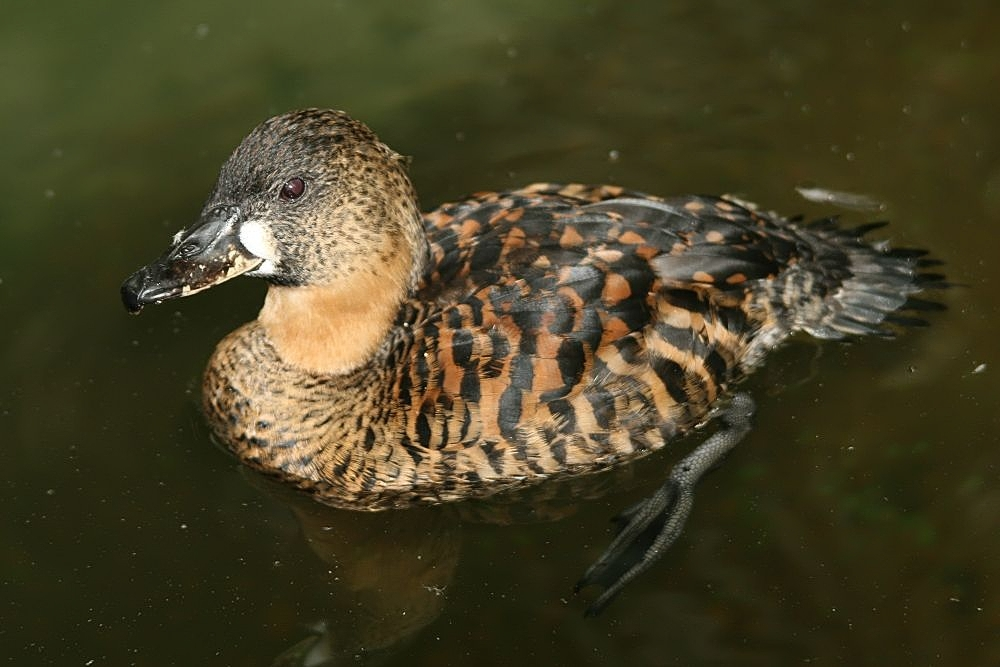

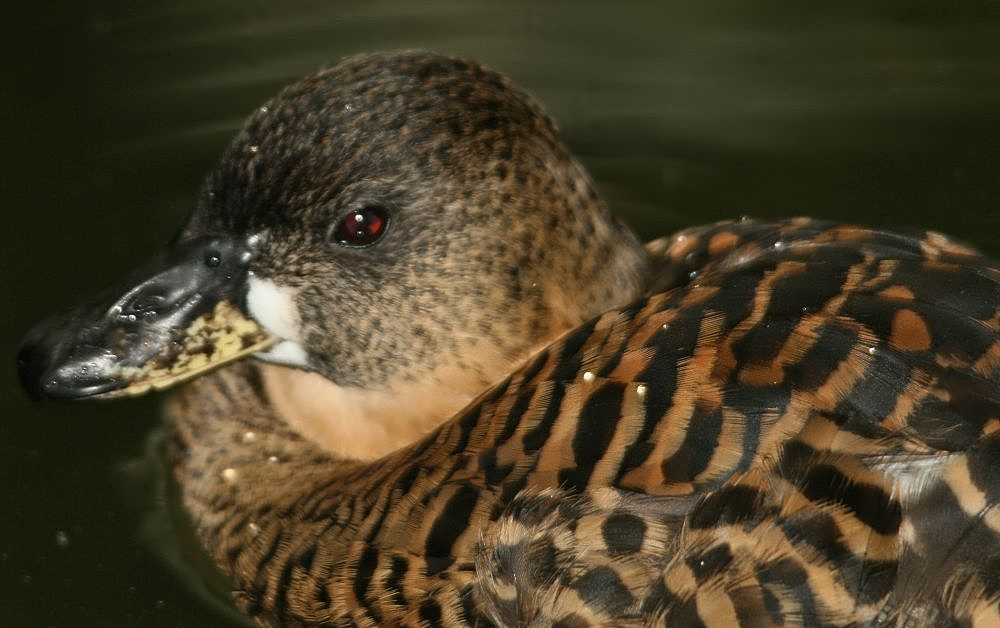

== Distribution and habitat ==
White-backed ducks live in Africa, especially between Senegal and Chad in the west, Ethiopia in the east, and South Africa in the south. Their habitat consists of lakes, ponds, swamps and marshes where they are well camouflaged against predators.

== Subspecies ==
There are two subspecies, Thalassornis leuconotus leuconotus and Thalassornis leuconotus insularis. The latter lives entirely on Madagascar and is considered endangered as a result of hunting, habitat loss and the introduction of competing exotic species.

== Conservation ==
The white-backed duck is one of the species to which the Agreement on the Conservation of African-Eurasian Migratory Waterbirds (AEWA) applies.

Woolaver and Nichols conducted a nesting survey of the Madagascar race in 2001 at Lake Antsamaka in western Madagascar. They found a total of 37, indicating the significance of this single site for the conservation of this insular subspecies. Young, et al. (2006) suggested that an earlier population estimate of 2,500–5,000 total birds in Madagascar by Delany and Scott may be too optimistic. Its African population may be in the range of 10,000 to 25,000 birds.
