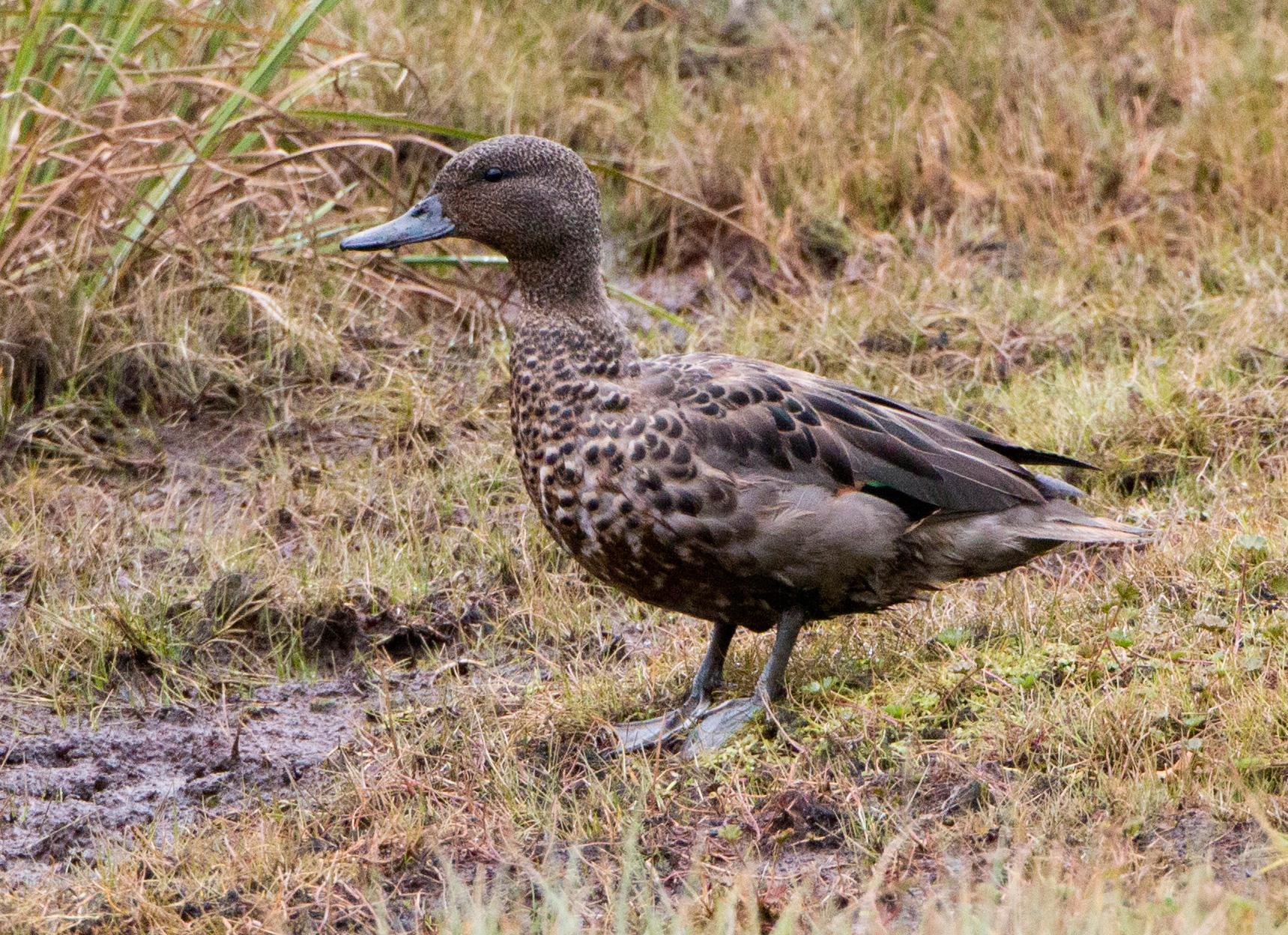
- Andean teal on the shores of Laguna la Magdalena, Sangay NP, Ecuador

Conservation status
- Least Concern (IUCN 3.1)

Scientific classification
- Kingdom: Animalia
- Phylum: Chordata
- Class: Aves
- Order: Anseriformes
- Family: Anatidae
- Genus: Anas
- Species: A. andium

Binomial name
- Anas andium (Sclater, PL & Salvin, 1873)

Subspecies
- 2, see text

Synonyms
- Anas flavirostris andium

= Andean teal =

Species of bird

The Andean teal (Anas andium) is a South American species of duck. Like other teals, it belongs to the diverse genus Anas; more precisely it is one of the "true" teals of subgenus Nettion. It is restricted to the Andean highlands of Colombia, Venezuela, and Ecuador. It inhabits freshwater wetlands, preferring palustrine habitat to rivers. It is not considered threatened by the IUCN.

== Taxonomy ==
Mitochondrial DNA sequence data is most similar to that of the very different-looking green-winged teal. Apart from the mystifying relationship with the red-and-green-headed teals, it altogether most resembles the Indian Ocean radiation of teals.

Traditionally, there are 2 subspecies:

- Mérida teal, Anas andium altipetens (Conover, 1941) – highlands of north-west Venezuela and adjacent parts of Colombia.
- nominate, Anas andium andium (Sclater & Salvin, 1873) - highlands of Colombia and Ecuador.

This species and the yellow-billed teal are sometimes considered conspecific under the name speckled teal (A. flavirostris), but increasingly taxonomists treat the two as distinct species. When split, the scientific name A. flavirostris is restricted to the yellow-billed teal.

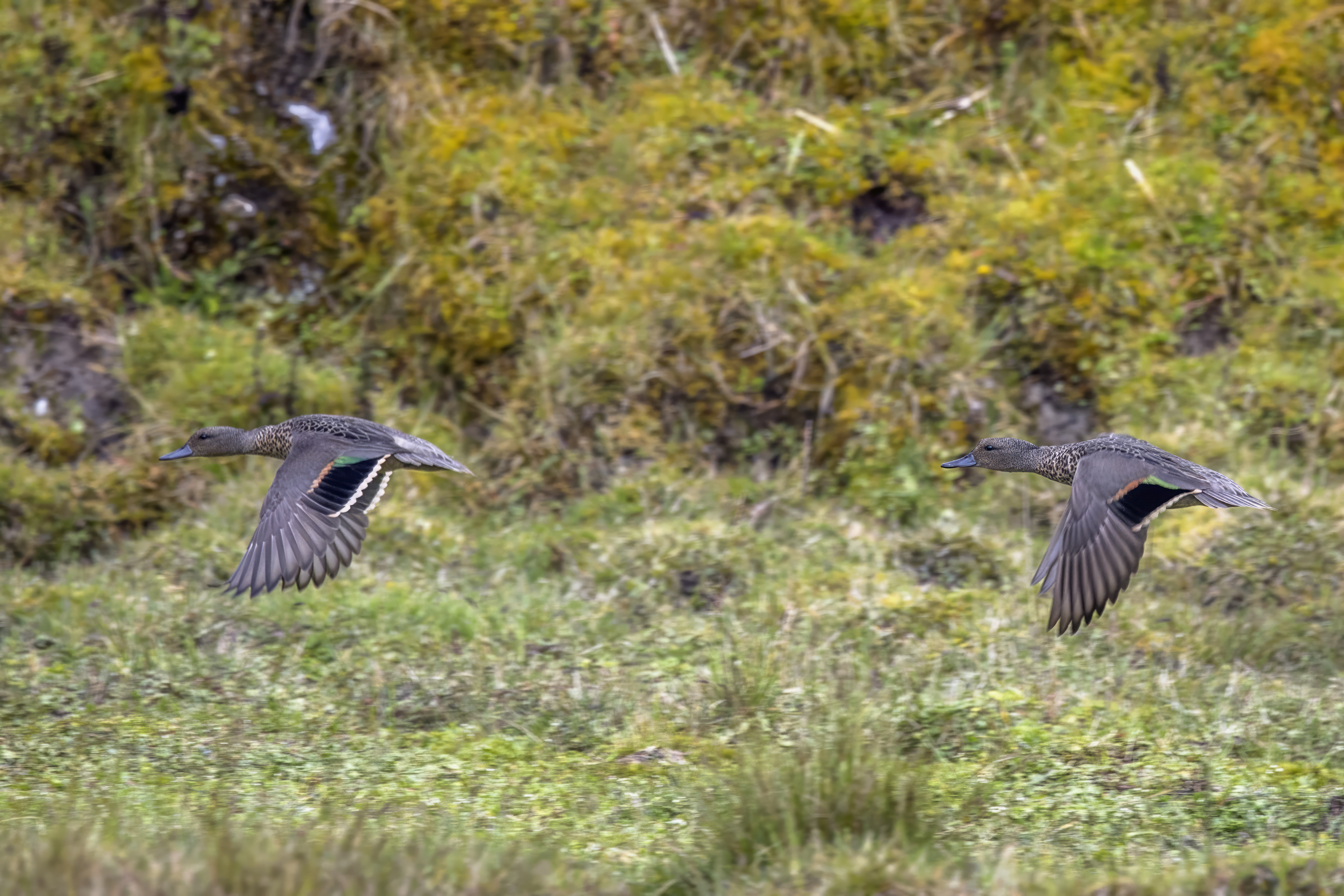
A. a. andium males, Mina de Palacio,

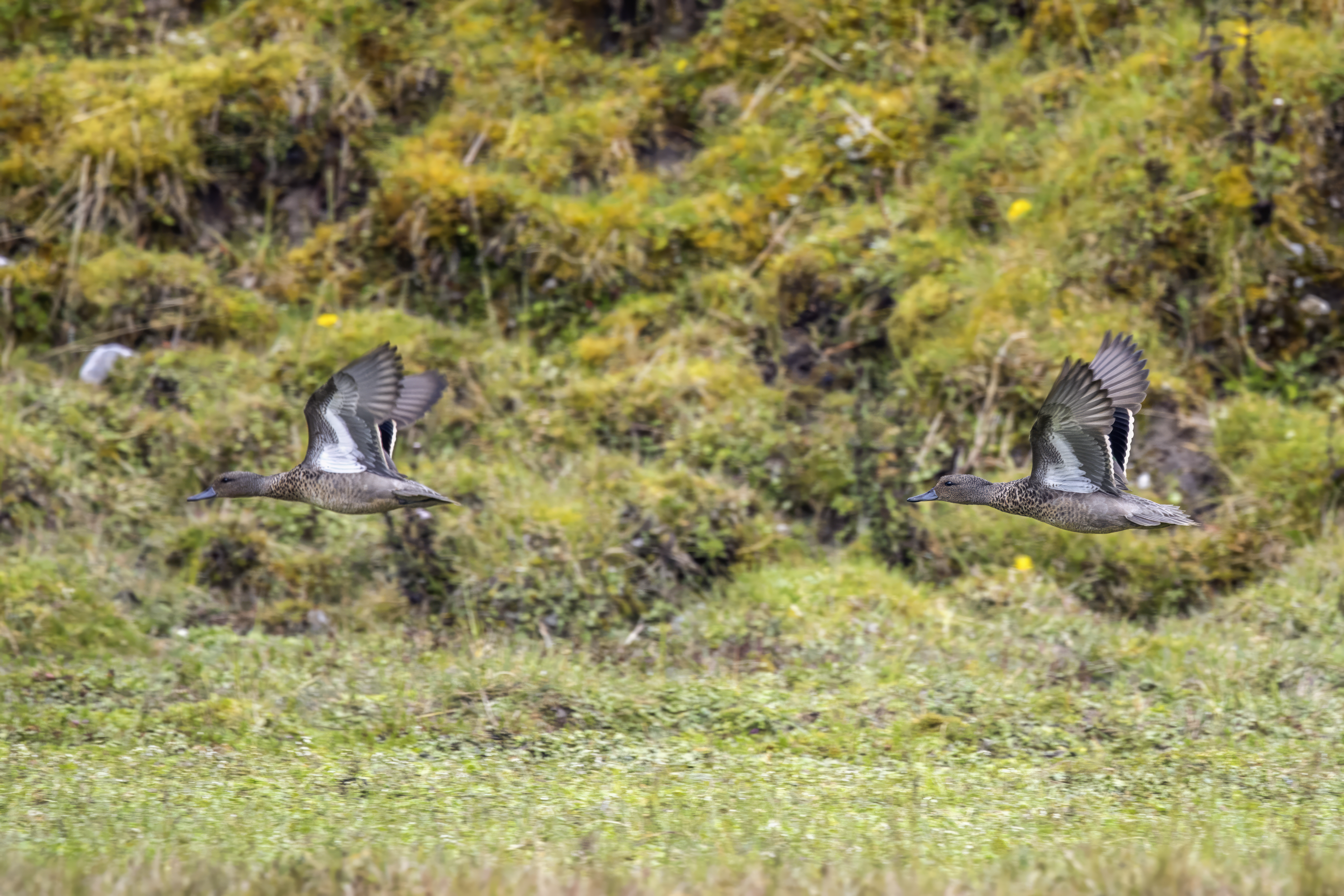
Chingaza National Natural Park, Colombia
