= Tirarinetta =

Tirarinetta Temporal range: Pliocene

Scientific classification
- Kingdom: Animalia
- Phylum: Chordata
- Class: Aves
- Order: Anseriformes
- Family: Anatidae
- Genus: †Tirarinetta
- Species: †T. kanunka

Binomial name
- †Tirarinetta kanunka Worthy, 2008

Extinct genus of birds

Tirarinetta is an extinct genus of anatid that lived during the Pliocene in Australia.

== Distribution ==
Fossils of T. kanunka are known from the Tirari Formation of the Lake Eyre Basin.
