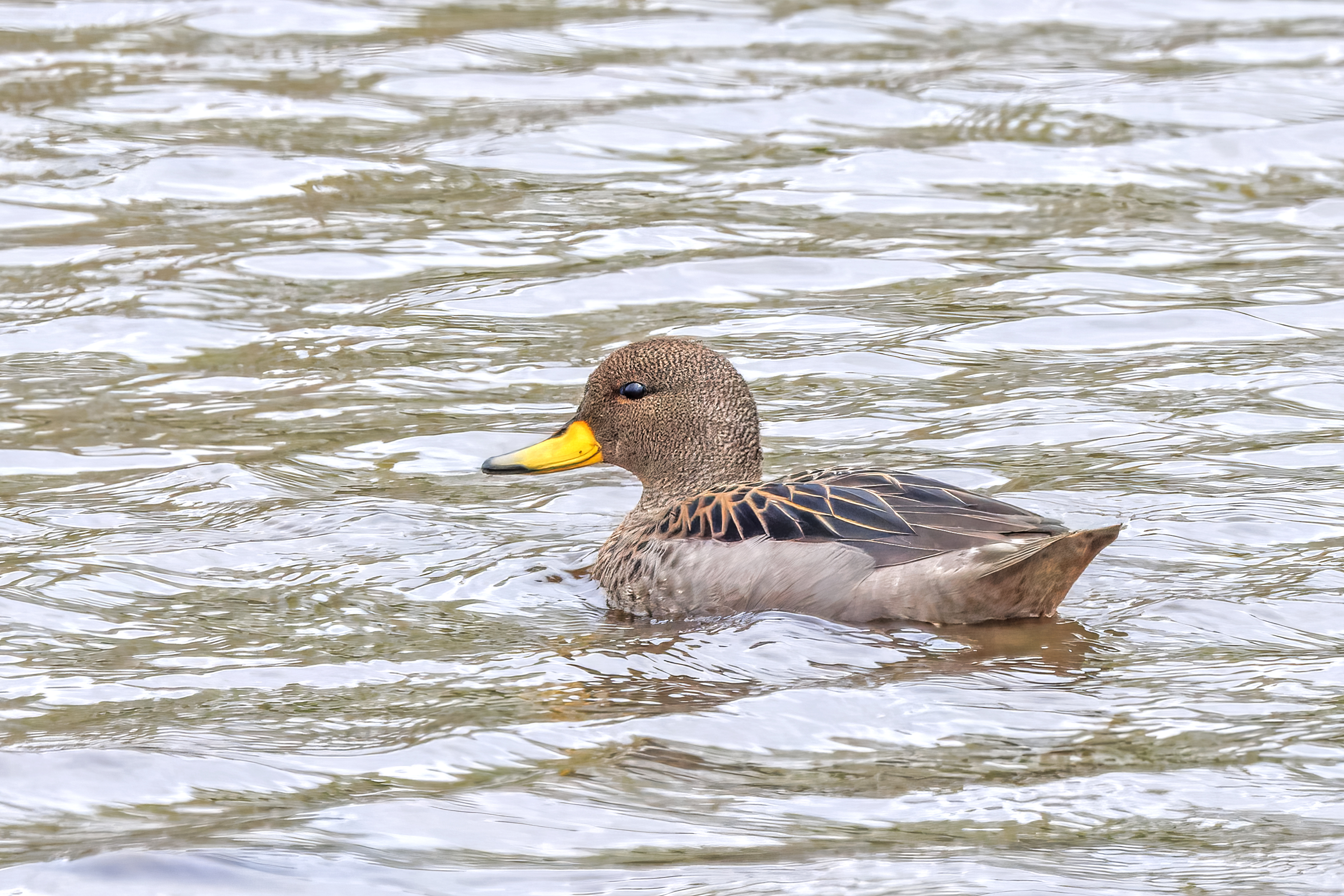
- in Chile

Conservation status
- Least Concern (IUCN 3.1)

Scientific classification
- Kingdom: Animalia
- Phylum: Chordata
- Class: Aves
- Order: Anseriformes
- Family: Anatidae
- Genus: Anas
- Species: A. flavirostris

Binomial name
- Anas flavirostris Vieillot, 1816

Subspecies
- Anas flavirostris oxyptera; Anas flavirostris flavirostris

= Yellow-billed teal =

Species of bird

The yellow-billed teal (Anas flavirostris) is a South American species of duck. Like other teals, it belongs to the diverse genus Anas; more precisely it is one of the "true" teals of subgenus Nettion. It occurs in Argentina, the Falkland Islands, Chile, Peru, Bolivia, Uruguay, and Brazil. It has also established itself in South Georgia, where it was first recorded breeding in 1971, and has been recorded as far east as Tristan da Cunha. It inhabits freshwater wetlands, preferring palustrine habitat to rivers. Considering its wide range and local abundance, it is not considered threatened by the IUCN.

== Description ==
The namesake bill is bright yellow with a black tip and a black band along the ridge of the culmen. The species is somewhat similar to the larger yellow-billed pintail, but has a darker head, shorter neck and plain grayish sides.

== Taxonomy ==
Mitochondrial DNA sequence data is most similar to that of the very different-looking green-winged teal. (Note: Johnson & Sorenson (1999); see there for a discussion of the crecca-carolinensis-flavirostris group's phylogeny.) Apart from the mystifying relationship with the red-and-green-headed teals, it altogether most resembles the Indian Ocean radiation of teals. However, the yellow-billed teal's unicolored underside and namesake bill are unique, as is to be expected from a species that evolved half a world apart from Bernier's or the grey teal.

This species is also unique among its relatives in some aspects of its post-copulation behavior: After dismounting, the drakes stretch themselves up high and swim around and alongside the females.

Traditionally, there are 2 subspecies:

- Sharp-winged teal, Anas flavirostris oxyptera (Meyen, 1834) – highlands of central Peru to northern Chile and Argentina.
- Chilean teal, Anas flavirostris flavirostris (Vieillot, 1816) – southern South America as far north as southern Brazil and northern Argentina. Also in the Falkland Islands.

Previously, this species and the Andean teal formed the superspecies speckled teal, but increasingly taxonomists consider the two species distinct.

== Gallery ==
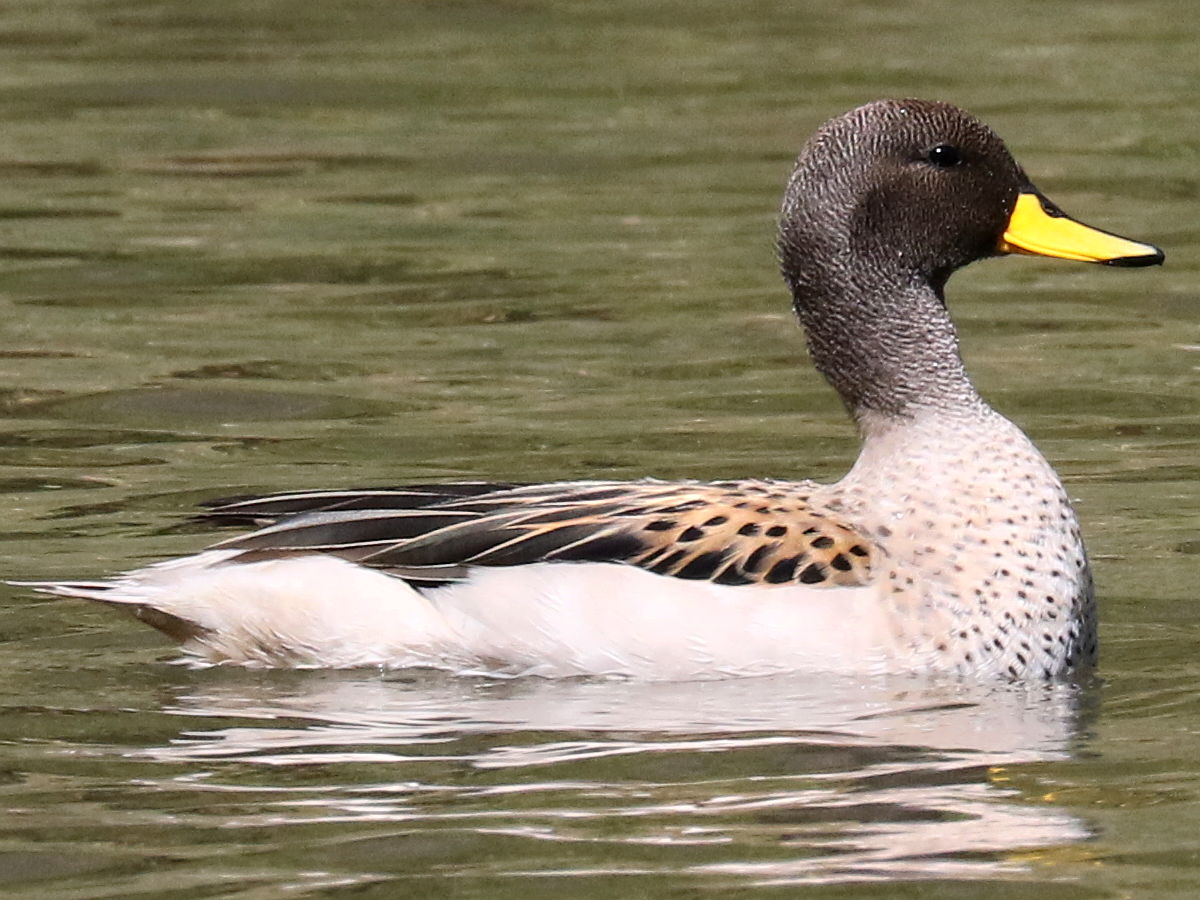
A. f. oxyptera in Peru

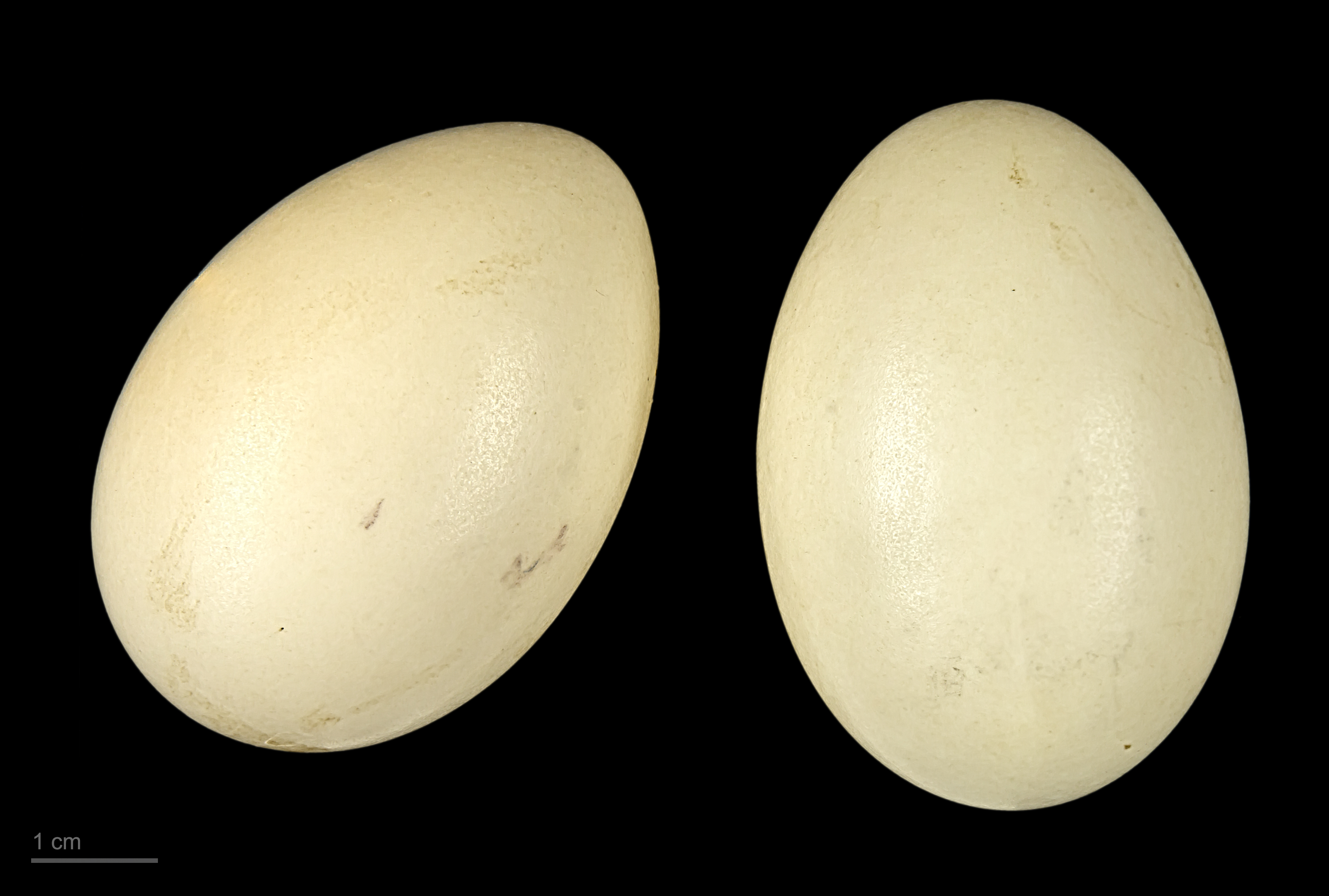
Anas flavirostris oxyptera — MHNT
