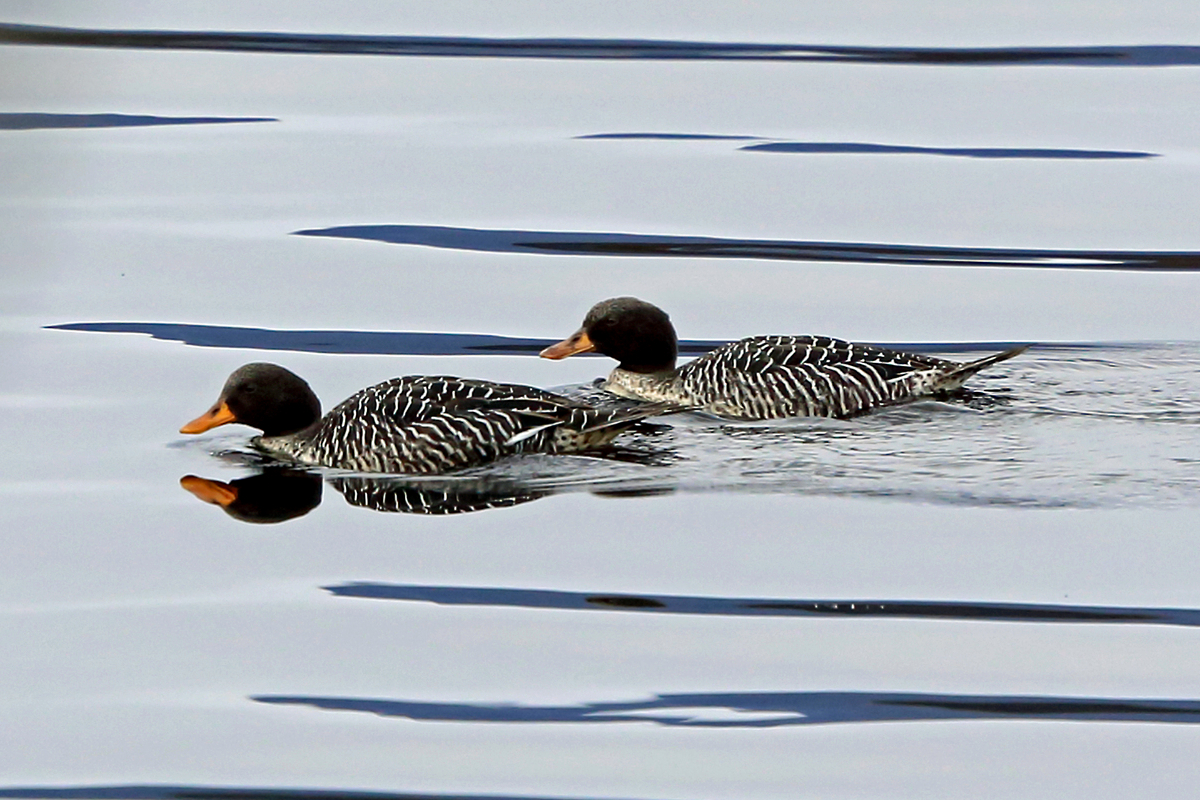

Conservation status
- Least Concern (IUCN 3.1)

Scientific classification
- Kingdom: Animalia
- Phylum: Chordata
- Class: Aves
- Order: Anseriformes
- Family: Anatidae
- Genus: Salvadorina; Rothschild & Hartert, 1894
- Species: S. waigiuensis

Binomial name
- Salvadorina waigiuensis Rothschild & Hartert, 1894

= Salvadori's teal =

Species of bird

Salvadori's teal (Salvadorina waigiuensis) or Salvadori's duck, is a species of bird endemic to New Guinea. It is placed in the monotypic genus Salvadorina.

It has a dark brown head and neck, and its body is barred and spotted dark brown and off white, with orange legs and a yellow bill.

It is a secretive inhabitant of fast-flowing highland streams and lakes. It is an omnivore. It locates its nest near water, and lays two to four eggs in the dry season. The IUCN has listed the bird as least concern, and the total population may be slowly declining.

== Taxonomy ==
When Walter Rothschild and Ernst Hartert first described Salvadori's teal in 1894, they placed it in the concurrently created monotypic genus Salvadorina. It has no subspecies. Initially, it was generally placed with South America's torrent duck and New Zealand's blue duck, two species of similar ecological niches in a tribe called Merganettini. In the 1940s, Ernst Mayr moved the species to the dabbling duck genus Anas, based on several anatomical features.

The duck's common and genus names both commemorate 18th-century Italian ornithologist Tommaso Salvadori. The species name waigiuensis refers to Waigeo (also known as Waigiu), an island near New Guinea.

== Description ==
Measuring 38–43 cm (15–17 in) in length, with a wingspan of 56–71 cm (22–28 in), and weighing 400–525 g (14.1–18.5 oz), Salvadori's teal is a small duck, about half the weight of a Mallard. The sexes are similar in plumage, with males averaging slightly larger than females.

== Range and habitat ==
Salvadori's teal is endemic to New Guinea; although the type specimen was reportedly collected on the Indonesian island of Waigeo, there is doubt over the veracity of that claim, as the species is not now found there; it was more likely collected in the Vogelkop mountains of westernmost New Guinea. Resident at elevations ranging from 500 to 4,000 m (1,600 to 13,100 ft), Salvadori's teal prefers swiftly flowing rivers and streams, though it is also occasionally found in stagnant lakes.

== Behaviour ==
=== Food and feeding ===
Salvadori's teal is an omnivore, and feeds by both dabbling and diving. It eats plants and insects, and possibly small fish.

=== Breeding ===
It locates its nest near water, and lays two to four eggs in the dry season.

== Conservation and threats ==
The International Union for Conservation of Nature (IUCN) has listed Salvadori's teal as least concern. The total world population, currently estimated to be between 2,500 and 9,999 mature individuals, is thought to be declining at a moderate rate. Hunting, habitat degradation and predation by dogs are among the threats this species faces, and competition with introduced sport fish may also cause problems.
