= Dunstanetta =

Dunstanetta johnstoneorum Temporal range: Early Miocene 19–16 Ma

Scientific classification
- Kingdom: Animalia
- Phylum: Chordata
- Class: Aves
- Order: Anseriformes
- Family: Anatidae
- Genus: †Dunstanetta; Worthy et al., 2007
- Species: †D. johnstoneorum

Binomial name
- †Dunstanetta johnstoneorum Worthy et al., 2007

Extinct genus of birds

Dunstanetta johnstoneorum is a genus and species of extinct duck from the Miocene of New Zealand. It was described from fossil material (a distal left humerus) collected from a Saint Bathans Fauna site on Home Hills Station, in the lower Bannockburn Formation of the Manuherikia Group, in the Manuherikia River valley in the Central Otago region of the South Island. The genus name refers to the Dunstan Range, the mountains of which overlook the fossil site. The specific epithet honours Ann and Euan Johnstone of Home Hills Station.
