= Pinpanetta =

Pinpanetta Temporal range: Late Oligocene, 26–24 Ma

Scientific classification
- Kingdom: Animalia
- Phylum: Chordata
- Class: Aves
- Order: Anseriformes
- Family: Anatidae
- Subfamily: Anatinae
- Genus: †Pinpanetta; Worthy, 2009

Species
- See text

Extinct genus of birds

Pinpanetta is an extinct genus of birds, in the duck family, from the Late Oligocene of central Australia. The genus name comes from Lake Pinpa, in the Lake Eyre Basin of north-eastern South Australia, with reference to the Pinpa Local Fauna from which much of the descriptive fossil material derives, and from the Greek netta (“duck”). It comprises three species:

- P. tedfordi Worthy, 2009 (type species)
- P. vickersrichae Worthy, 2009
- P. fromensis Worthy, 2009
