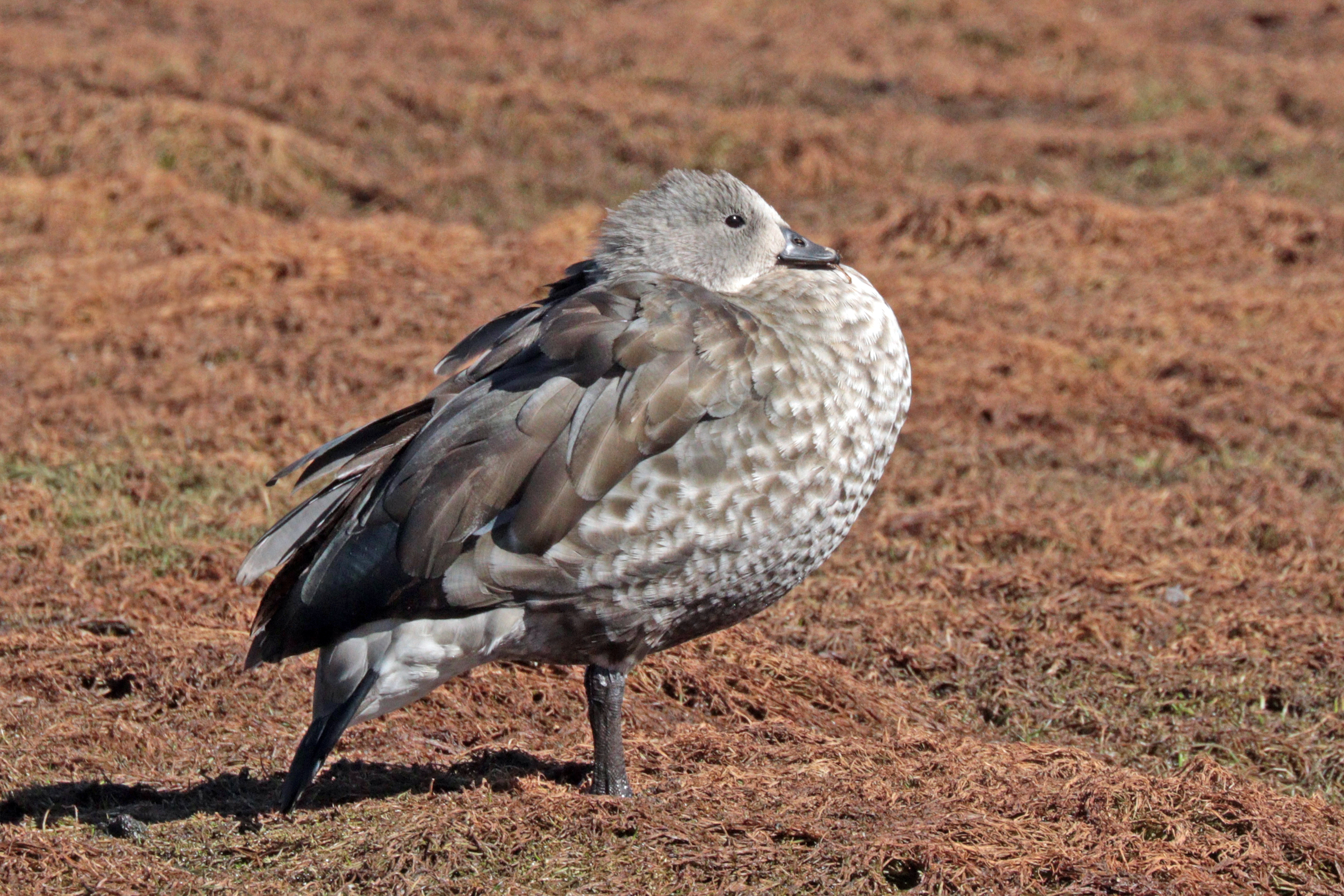
- In the Bale Mountains, Ethiopia

Conservation status
- Near Threatened (IUCN 3.1)

Scientific classification
- Kingdom: Animalia
- Phylum: Chordata
- Class: Aves
- Order: Anseriformes
- Family: Anatidae
- Genus: Cyanochen; Bonaparte, 1856
- Species: C. cyanoptera

Binomial name
- Cyanochen cyanoptera (Rüppell, 1845)

Synonyms
- Cyanochen cyanopterus (Rüppell, 1845)

= Blue-winged goose =

Species of bird

The blue-winged goose (Cyanochen cyanoptera) is a waterfowl species which is endemic to Ethiopia. It is the only member of the genus Cyanochen.

== Relations ==
The relations of this species among the waterfowl was long unresolved. It is morphologically close to shelducks, and particularly the South American sheldgeese, which have similar courtship displays. However, mitochondrial DNA sequence analyses of the cytochrome b and NADH dehydrogenase subunit 2 genes indicates that it might belong to a very distinct and ancient "duck" clade, together with Hartlaub's duck, another African species of uncertain affinities. The wing pattern, a good morphological indicator of evolutionary relationships in waterfowl, is similar in these two species, and different to most other waterfowl (though shared by species in the genus Spatula). More recent genetic evidence has confirmed this clade, and further points to their belonging to a larger group of diving ducks, with their closest relatives being a clade containing marbled duck (Marmaronetta angustirostris), white-winged duck (Asarcornis scutulata), and the widespread genera Netta and Aythya; with these, they are next closest to Australian wood duck (Chenonetta jubata) in Australia, blue duck (Hymenolaimus malacorhynchos) in New Zealand, and the pantropical comb ducks (Sarkidiornis).

== Description ==
It is a stocky grey-brown goose-like bird about 60–75 centimetres (24–30 in) long with a slightly paler head and upper neck. It has a small black bill and black legs. Standing birds look fairly dull, grey and dirty white, sometimes showing the blue along the edge of the wing. The sexes are similar, but immature birds are duller. The plumage is thick and loose, an adaptation to the cold of the Ethiopian highlands. In flight, the pale blue upper forewing is conspicuous; the primary feathers are black, and the secondary feathers black glossed green. The underwing has black primaries and secondaris, and a white inner forewing.

=== Voice ===
The blue-winged goose is a quiet species, but both sexes may give a high-pitched whistle; it does not honk or cackle like the true geese, but may make a barking alarm call when flushed.

== Habitat ==
Its preferred habitat is grasslands close to rivers, freshwater lakes, swamps, freshwater marshes, water storage areas, in high altitude subtropical or tropical shrubland or grassland at 2,500–4,000 m altitude.

== Behaviour ==
It feeds by grazing, and is apparently largely nocturnal, loafing during the day. It can swim and fly well, but this terrestrial bird is reluctant to do either, and is quite approachable. It forms flocks of up to 100 outside the breeding season.

It breeds by mountain lakes and streams. The nests of wild birds have not been described; in captivity, it builds a lined nest amongst grass tussocks, and lays 6–7 eggs.

== Status ==
It is threatened by habitat loss, trapping for food and possibly drought. It is classified as a Near Threatened species on the IUCN Red List.

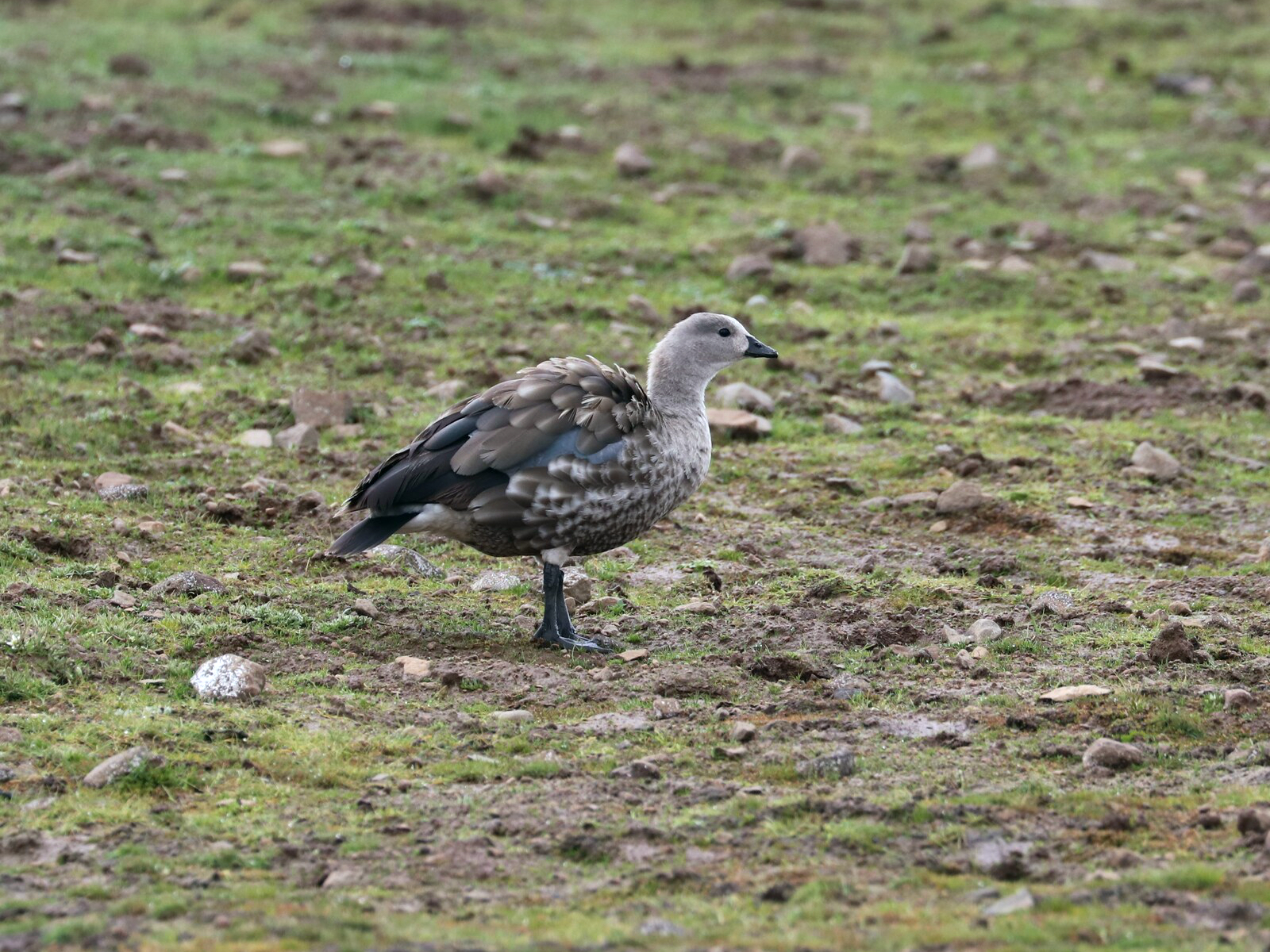
Bale Mountains, Ethiopia

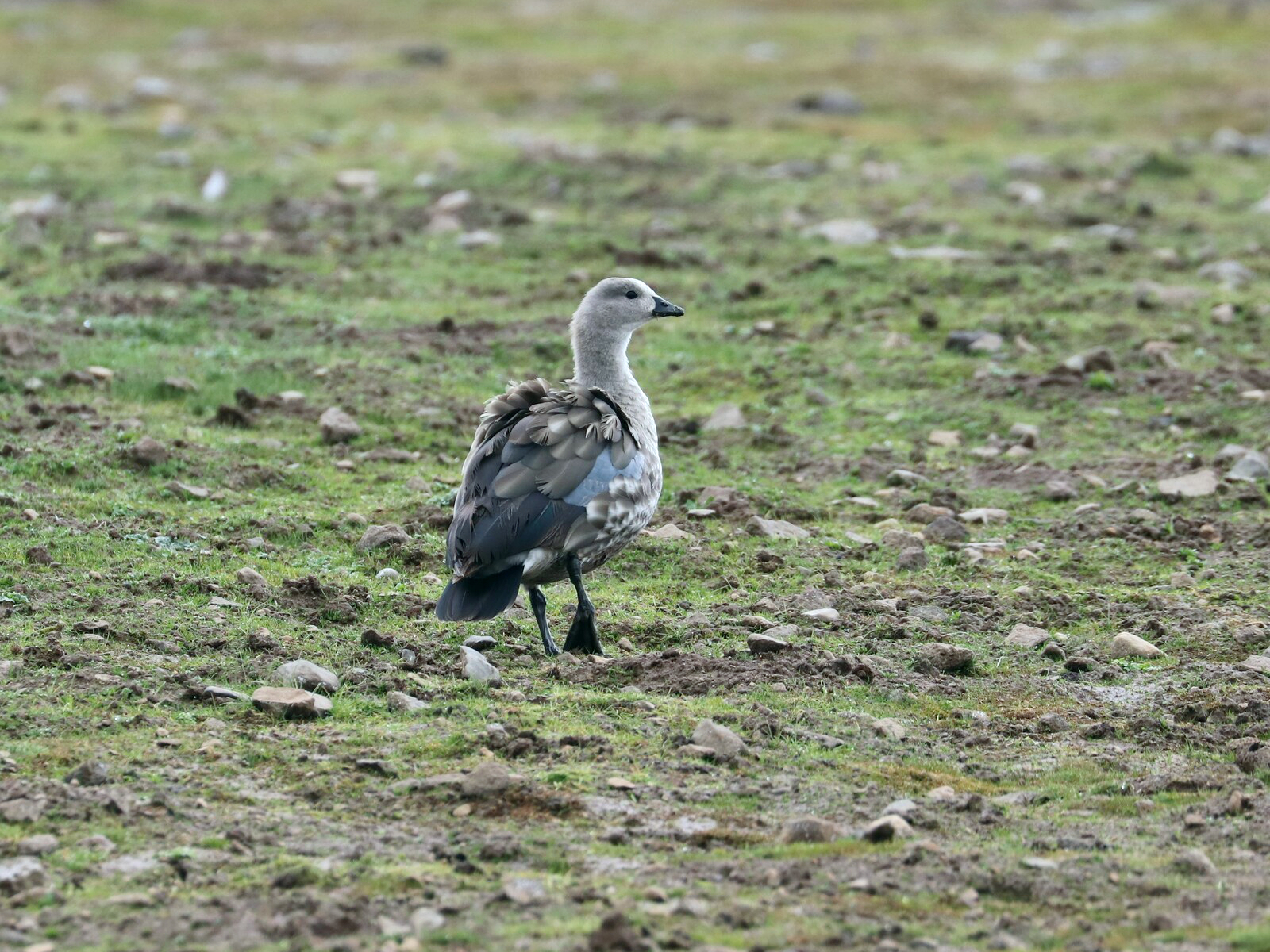
Bale Mountains, Ethiopia

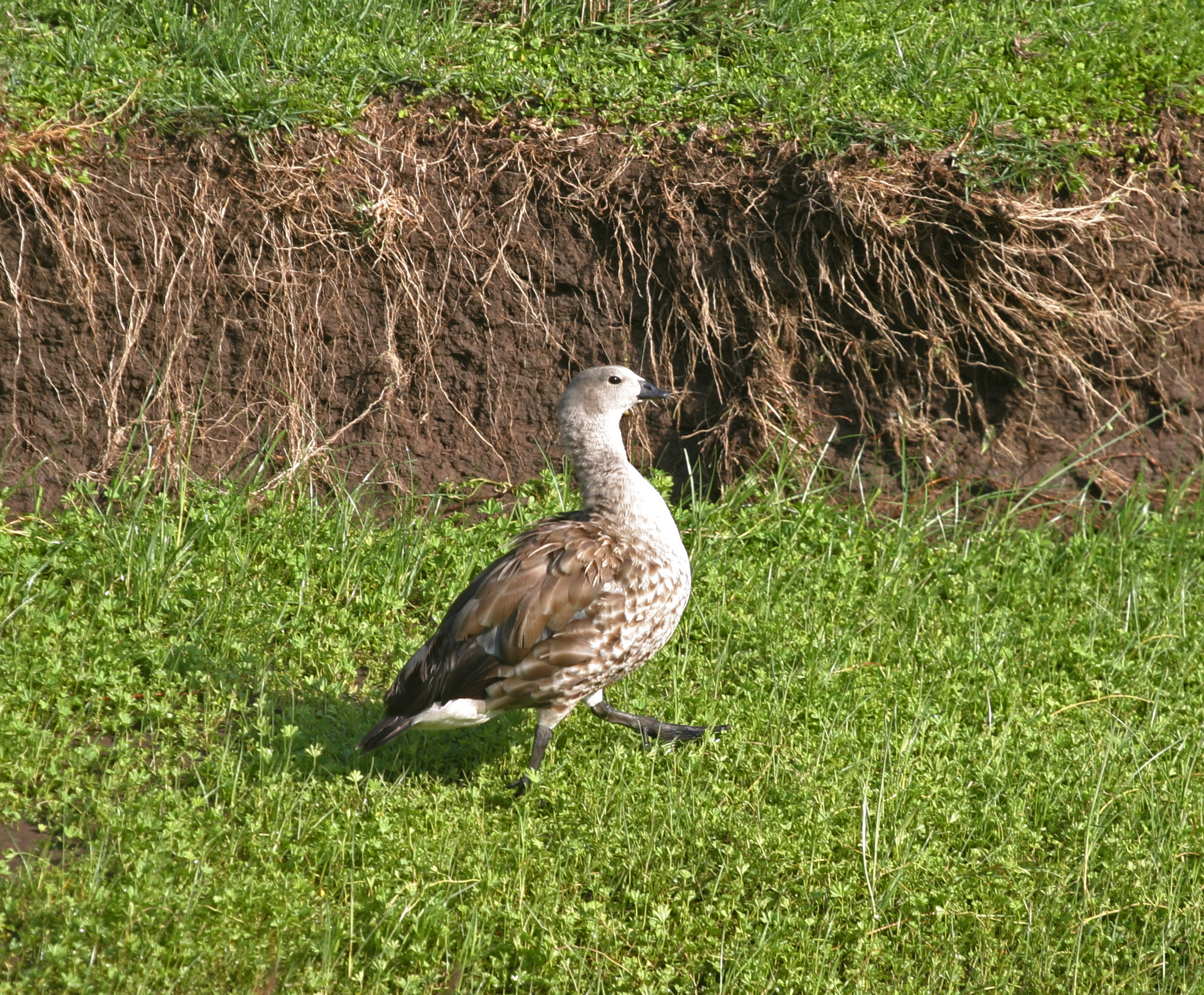
Debre Libanos, Ethiopia
