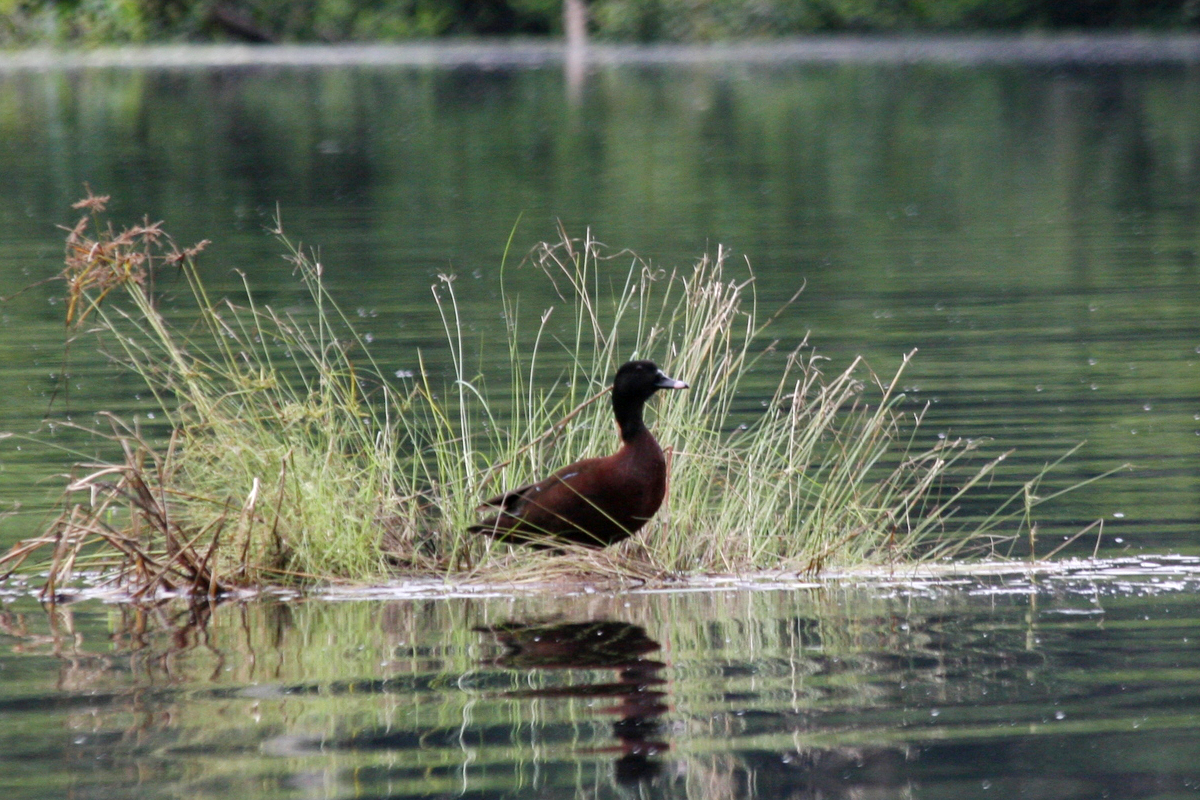
- At Lac Mafoumi in Gabon

Conservation status
- Least Concern (IUCN 3.1)

Scientific classification
- Kingdom: Animalia
- Phylum: Chordata
- Class: Aves
- Order: Anseriformes
- Family: Anatidae
- Genus: Pteronetta; Salvadori, 1895
- Species: P. hartlaubii

Binomial name
- Pteronetta hartlaubii (Cassin, 1860)

= Hartlaub's duck =

Species of bird

Hartlaub's duck (Pteronetta hartlaubii) is a dark chestnut-coloured duck of African forests. Formerly included in the paraphyletic "perching duck" assemblage, it was later moved to the dabbling duck assemblage. However, it is distinct from the "typical" dabbling ducks, and is placed in the monotypic genus Pteronetta. It is named after the German naturalist Gustav Hartlaub.

== Taxonomy ==
Analysis of mtDNA sequences of the cytochrome b and NADH dehydrogenase subunit 2 genes suggests that it belongs into a distinct clade together with the blue-winged goose (Cyanochen cyanoptera), another African species of waterfowl. More recent genetic evidence has confirmed this clade, and further points to their belonging to a larger group of diving ducks, with their closest relatives being a clade containing marbled duck (Marmaronetta angustirostris), white-winged duck (Asarcornis scutulata), and the widespread genera Netta and Aythya; with these, they are next closest to Australian wood duck (Chenonetta jubata) in Australia, blue duck (Hymenolaimus malacorhynchos) in New Zealand, and the pantropical comb ducks (Sarkidiornis).

== Description ==
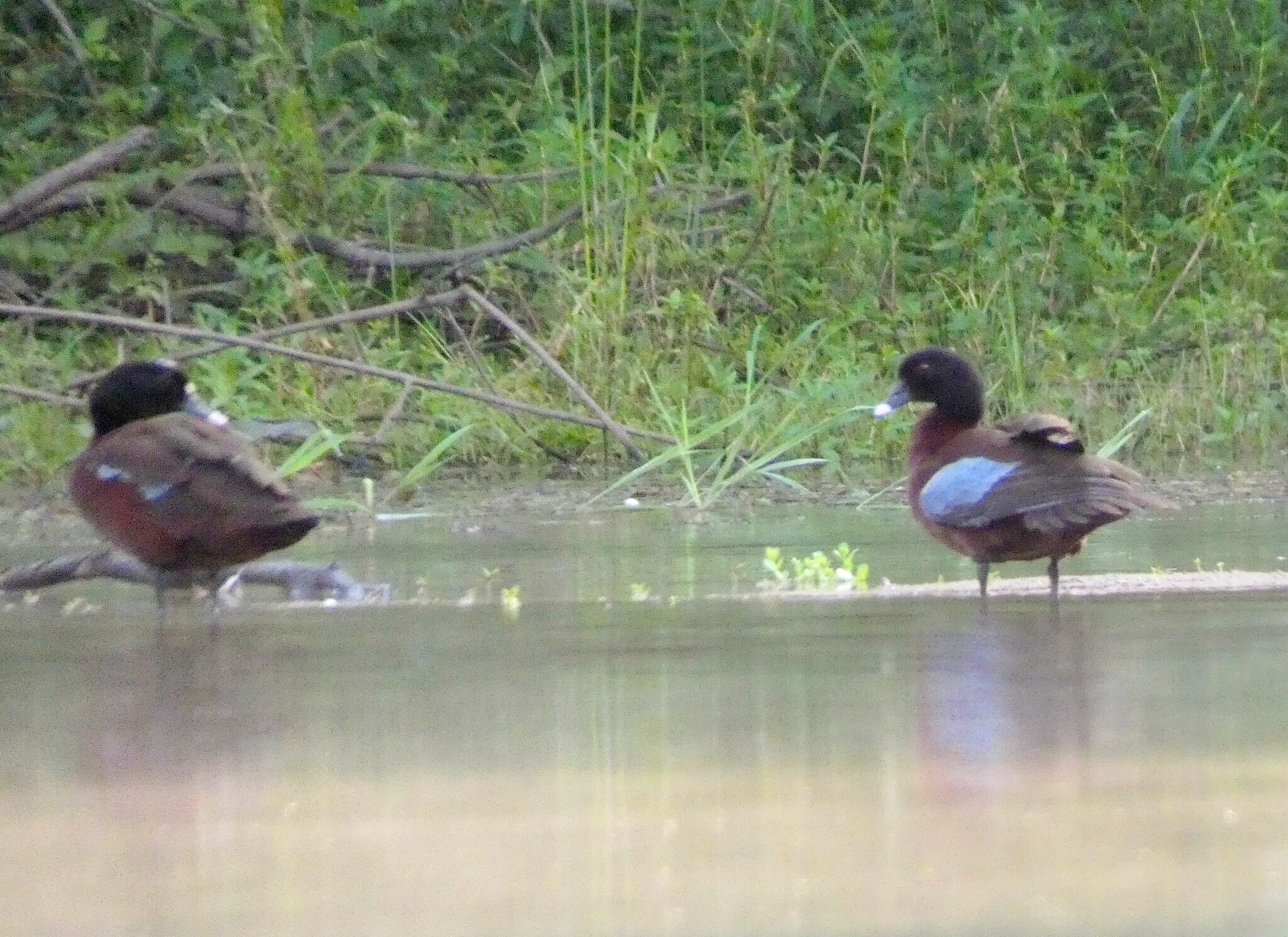
Pair of Hartlaub's ducks in Cameroon

On average, Hartlaub's ducks range from 56–58 centimetres (22–23 in) long. It is monotypic, with no subspecies accepted. Juveniles have feathers with pale tips on their breast and abdomen. The adult plumage is red-brown overall with a black head with or without white marks on the crown; adult plumage is fully developed after six months. The amount of white on each duck's head varies. Adult males weigh between 925–1,140 grams (32.6–40.2 oz), and have reddish-brown eyes; they are more likely to have extensive white on the crown. The females weigh between 770 and 805 grams (27.2 and 28.4 oz), and rarely have any white on their heads; they have dark red eyes. Both sexes have a blue patch on their wing that distinguishes them from most other waterfowl. During mating season, the base of the male's bill will enlarge.

== Distribution ==
Hartlaub's duck is resident in equatorial West and Central Africa, from Guinea and Sierra Leone east through Nigeria to South Sudan, and south to Gabon, Congo and Zaire.

Hartlaub's ducks reside in swampy marshes, tropical forests, savanna areas, rivers, and streams. In Liberia, they live in mangroves. However, they will only gather in flocks in Liberia from January to May. Year-round, they will live in parts of central western Africa, including the Democratic Republic of Congo and Cameroon.

== Behaviour ==
In flight, Hartlaub's ducks will quack "ko-ko-ko-ko" or "kakakakarr". Their conversational sounds are "whit-whit-whit". When threatened, the males will quack a fast "wheezy whistle". When juveniles are in distress, they will give three calls in evenly spaced quick descending notes.

Their diet consists of aquatic invertebrates, such as insects and crustaceans. The Republic of Congo's Nouabalé-Ndoki National Park reports that the ducks regularly feed on the insects found in elephant dung. They also eat seeds and insect larvae. To remove ectoparasites, these ducks have been observed jumping onto the backs of bongo and forest buffalo. They are most active in the early morning and evening.

== Breeding ==
The nests have not yet been described in the wild, but they mate during rainy seasons in the months of June to September. The females lay cream-coloured eggs, and the chicks have sooty-black heads, yellowish bodies, and an additional orange tinge to the chin, neck, and face. These chicks weigh approximately 35-46 grams upon hatching.

== Population ==
This species has an extensive range, preventing it from meeting vulnerable criteria based on range size, habitat quality, and population limits. Despite a declining population trend, it does not demonstrate the rapidity required to warrant worrying over the possibility of distinction or at-risk status. The population size, varying from moderately small to large, also falls short of vulnerable thresholds. Consequently, this species is designated as "Least Concern" because of its extensive range and population count.

== Conservation ==
In 2006, there were reported to be between 26,000 and 110,000 Hartlaub's ducks in the world. Hartlaub's ducks were formerly considered threatened. However, as of 2020, they are no longer considered to be such. The largest threats to the Hartlaub's duck are forest destruction, hunting, and water pollution from mining and poison-fishing. This species is hunted and traded for medicinal purposes in Nigeria.

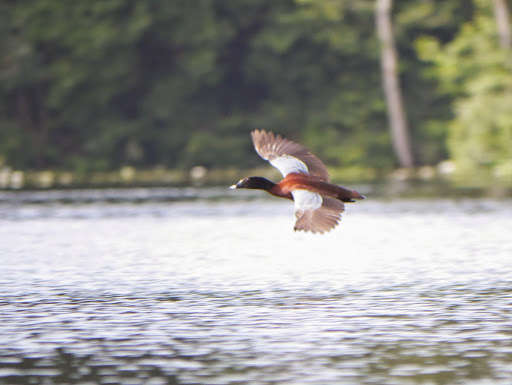
In flight, showing the blue forewing; Conkouati-Douli National Park, Republic of the Congo

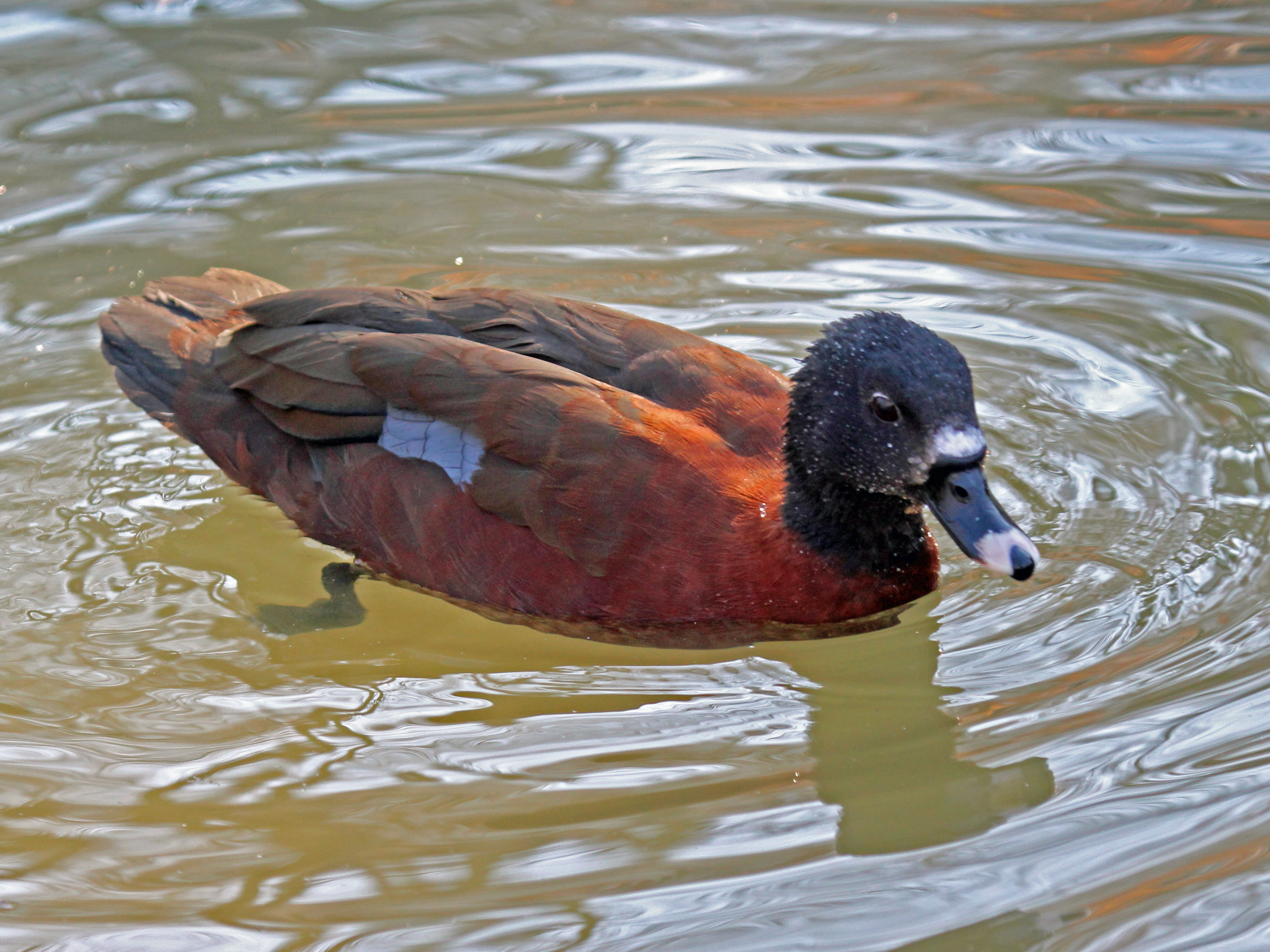
Captive

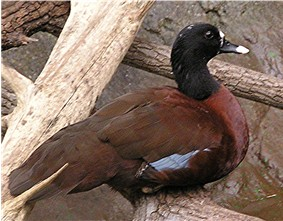
Captive
