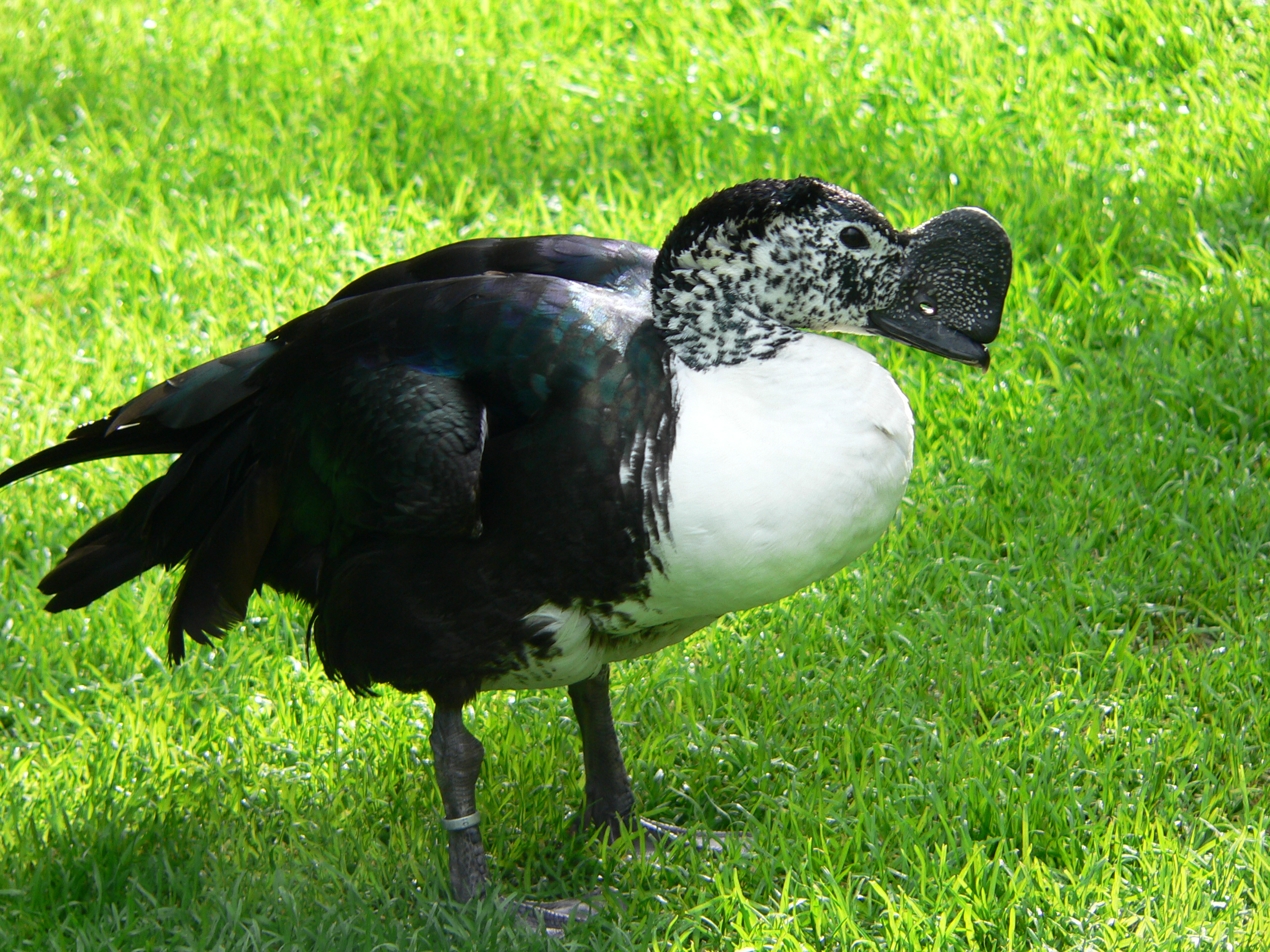
- male
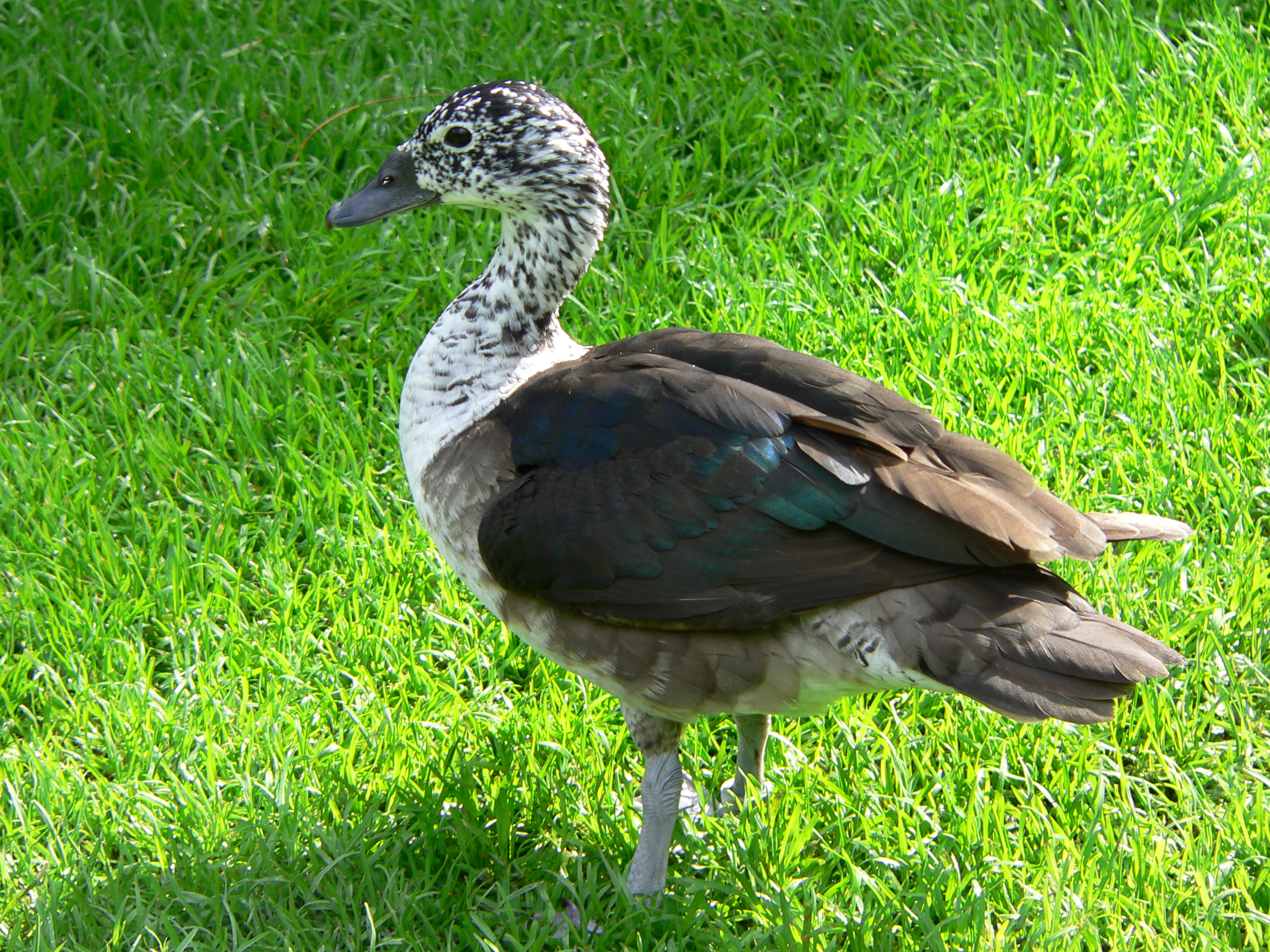
- female

Conservation status
- Least Concern (IUCN 3.1)

Scientific classification
- Kingdom: Animalia
- Phylum: Chordata
- Class: Aves
- Order: Anseriformes
- Family: Anatidae
- Genus: Sarkidiornis
- Species: S. sylvicola

Binomial name
- Sarkidiornis sylvicola Ihering, HFA & Ihering, R, 1907

Synonyms
- Sarkidiornis melanotos sylvicola

= Comb duck =

Species of bird

The comb duck or American comb duck (Sarkidiornis sylvicola), is an unusual duck found in tropical wetlands in continental South America south to the Paraguay River region in eastern Paraguay, southeastern Brazil and extreme northeastern Argentina, and as a vagrant on Trinidad.

Most taxonomic authorities split this species and the knob-billed duck from each other. The comb duck is generally smaller in size when compared to the knob-billed duck, and flanks are darker (black in males, medium grey in females).

== Taxonomy ==
Uncertainty surrounds the correct systematic placement of this species. Initially, it was placed in the dabbling duck subfamily Anatinae. Later, it was assigned to the "perching ducks", a paraphyletic assemblage of waterfowl most of which are intermediate between dabbling ducks and shelducks. As the "perching ducks" were split up, the comb duck was moved to the Tadorninae or shelduck subfamily.

Analysis of mtDNA sequences of the cytochrome b and NADH dehydrogenase subunit 2 genes, however, suggests that it is a quite basal member of the Anatidae, vindicating the earliest placement, but its closest living relatives cannot be resolved to satisfaction without further study.

== Description ==
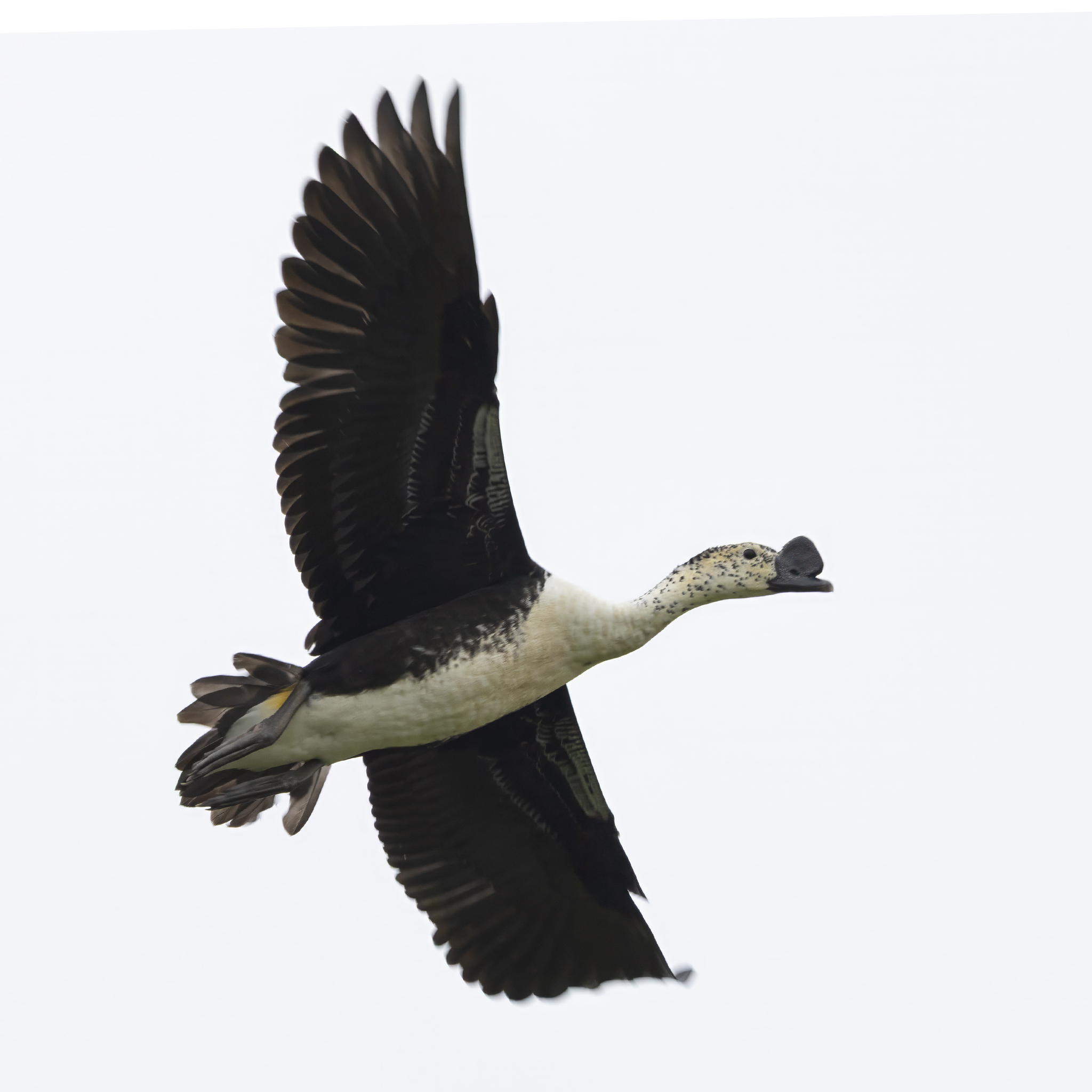
Male in flight, in Ecuador

It is one of the largest species of duck. Length can range from 56 to 76 cm (22 to 30 in), wingspan ranges from 116 to 145 cm (46 to 57 in) and weight from 1.03 to 2.9 kg (2.3 to 6.4 lb). Adults have a white head freckled with dark spots, and a pure white neck and underparts. The upperparts are glossy blue-black upperparts, with bluish and greenish iridescence especially prominent on the secondaries (lower arm feathers). The male is much larger than the female, and has a large black knob on the bill.

If seen at a distance, immature comb ducks can also be mistaken for a fulvous whistling duck (Dendrocygna bicolor). However, knob-billed ducks in immature plumage are rarely seen without adults nearby and thus they are usually easily identified, too.

== Ecology ==
It breeds in still freshwater swamps and lakes in the tropics. It is largely resident, apart from dispersion in the wet season.

This duck feeds on vegetation by grazing or dabbling and to a lesser extent on small fish, invertebrates, and seeds. It can become a problem to rice farmers. Knob-billed ducks often perch in trees. They are typically seen in flocks, small in the wet season, up to 100 in the dry season. Sometimes they separate according to sex.

=== Reproduction ===
Comb ducks nest mainly in tree holes, also in tall grass. They line their nests with reeds, grass, or feathers, but not down.

Males may have two mates at once or up to five in succession. They defend the females and young, but not the nest sites. Unmated males perch in trees and wait for opportunities to mate.

Females lay seven to 15 yellowish-white eggs. Several females may lay in a single "dump nest" containing up to 50 eggs.
