= Sinanas =

Sinanas Temporal range: Miocene
- Fossil specimen of S. diatomas, Shanghai Natural History Museum

Scientific classification
- Kingdom: Animalia
- Phylum: Chordata
- Class: Aves
- Order: Anseriformes
- Family: Anatidae
- Genus: †Sinanas
- Species: †S. diatomas

Binomial name
- †Sinanas diatomas Yeh, 1980

Extinct genus of birds

Sinanas is a genus of prehistoric duck that lived during the middle Miocene. The single known species is Sinanas diatomas. Fossils of the species have been recovered from the Shandong Province of China. Taxonomists are uncertain as to its affinities to modern waterfowl.
