= Anabernicula =

Anabernicula Temporal range: Pliocene - Pleistocene

Scientific classification
- Kingdom: Animalia
- Phylum: Chordata
- Class: Aves
- Order: Anseriformes
- Family: Anatidae
- Subfamily: Anatinae
- Genus: †Anabernicula; Ross, 1935

Extinct genus of birds

Anabernicula is an extinct genus of waterfowl related to shelducks that existed from the Pliocene to the Pleistocene in North America. Four species have been described: A. minuscula, A. gracilenta, A. oregonensis, and A. robusta. The genus got described for the first time by Ross in 1935.
