= Anatidae =

Anatidae Temporal range: Early Oligocene – recent
- Clockwise from top left: mallard, mute swan, Brazilian teal, paradise shelduck, bufflehead, and domestic goose

Scientific classification
- Kingdom: Animalia
- Phylum: Chordata
- Class: Aves
- Order: Anseriformes
- Suborder: Anseres
- Superfamily: Anatoidea
- Family: Anatidae; Leach, 1819

Type genus
- Anas Linnaeus, 1758

Genera
- Dendrocygninae; Dendrocygna; Thalassornis; Stictonettinae; Stictonetta; Anatinae; Oxyurini; Biziura; Heteronetta; Nomonyx; Oxyura; Possible members of Oxyurini; Malacorhynchus (perhaps Tadorninae); Mergini; Bucephala; Clangula; Histrionicus; Lophodytes; Melanitta; Mergellus; Mergus; Polysticta; Somateria; Anatini; Amazonetta; Anas; †Chelychelynechen; †Chendytes (stem group); Lophonetta; Mareca; †Ptaiochen; Sibirionetta; Spatula; Speculanas; †Thambetochen; Possible members of Anatini; Callonetta; Chenonetta (perhaps Tadorninae); Hymenolaimus (perhaps Aythyinae); Nettapus; Pteronetta; Tadorninae; Alopochen; Chloephaga; Merganetta; Neochen; Radjah; Salvadorina; Tadorna; Possible members of Tadorninae; Aix; Cairina; Cyanochen (perhaps Anserinae); Sarkidiornis (perhaps Anatinae); Tachyeres; Plectropterinae; Plectropterus; Aythyinae; Aythya; Marmaronetta; Netta; Possible members of Aythyinae; Asarcornis (perhaps Tadorninae); Rhodonessa (perhaps Tadorninae); Anserinae; Anser; Branta; Cereopsis; Coscoroba; Cygnus

Biological family of water birds

The Anatidae are the biological family of water birds that includes ducks, geese, and swans. The family has a cosmopolitan distribution, occurring on all the world's continents except Antarctica. These birds are adapted for swimming, floating on the water surface, and, in some cases, diving in at least shallow water. The family contains around 174 species in 43 genera.

They are generally herbivorous and are monogamous breeders. A number of species undertake annual migrations. A few species have been domesticated for agriculture, and many others are hunted for food and recreation. Five species have become extinct since 1600, and many more are threatened with extinction.

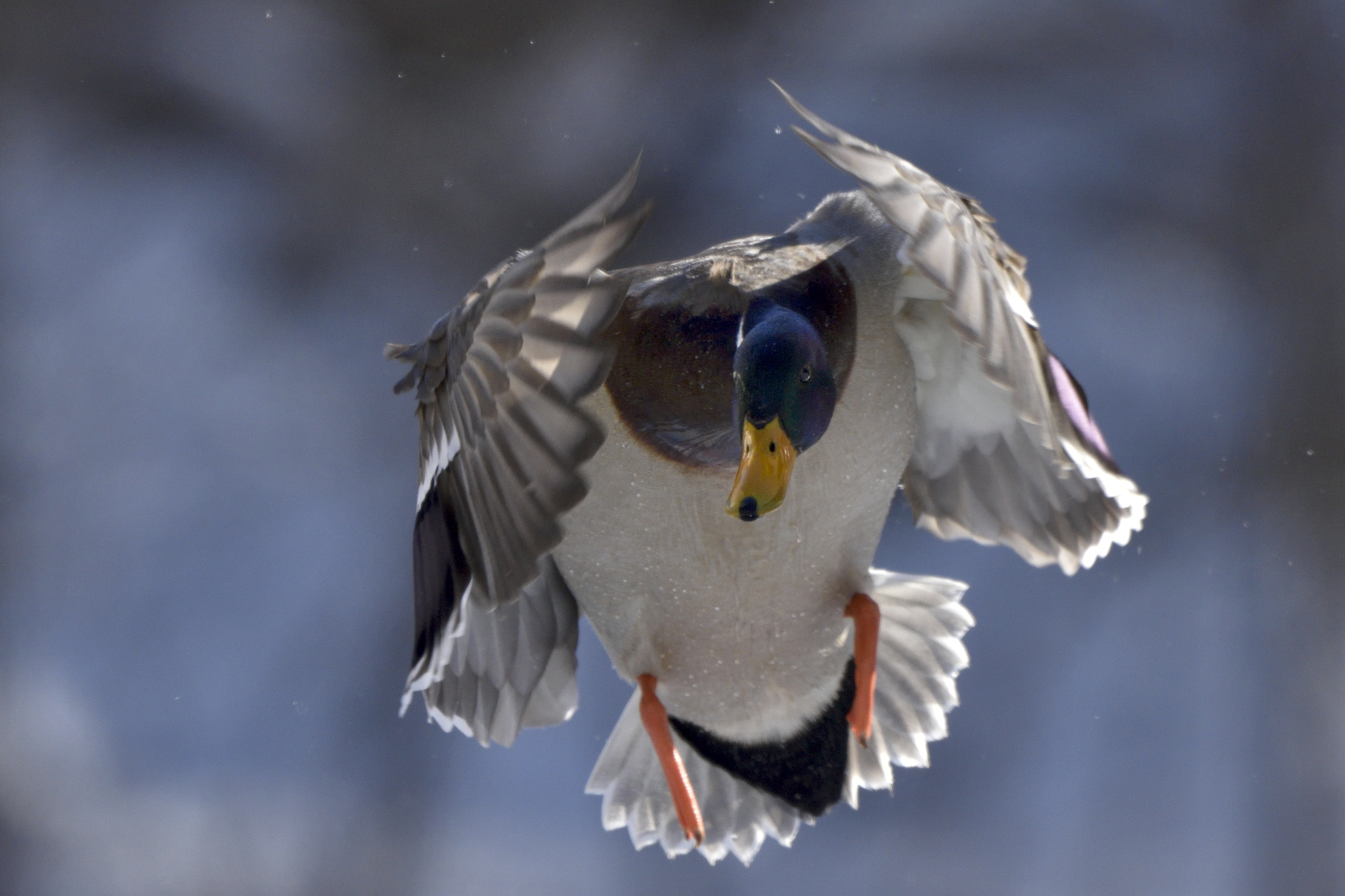
Landing mallard drake

== Description and ecology ==
The ducks, geese, and swans are small- to large-sized birds with a broad and elongated general body plan. Diving species vary from this in being rounder. Extant species range in size from the cotton pygmy goose, at as little as 26.5 cm (10.5 in) and 164 g (5.8 oz), to the trumpeter swan, at as much as 183 cm (6 ft) and 17.2 kg (38 lb). The largest anatid ever known is the extinct flightless Garganornis ballmanni at 22 kg (49 lb). The wings are short and pointed, and supported by strong wing muscles that generate rapid beats in flight. They typically have long necks, although this varies in degree between species. The legs are short, strong, and set far to the back of the body (more so in the more aquatic species), and have a leathery feel with a scaly texture. Combined with their body shape, this can make some species awkward on land, but they are stronger walkers than other marine and water birds such as grebes or petrels. They typically have webbed feet, though a few species such as the Nene have secondarily lost their webbing. The bills are made of soft keratin with a thin and sensitive layer of skin on top (which has a leathery feel when touched). For most species, the shape of the bill tends to be more flattened to a greater or lesser extent. These contain serrated lamellae which are particularly well defined in the filter-feeding species.

Their feathers are excellent at shedding water due to special oils. Many of the ducks display sexual dimorphism, with the males being more brightly coloured than the females (although the situation is reversed in species such as the paradise shelduck). The swans, geese, and whistling-ducks lack sexually dimorphic plumage. Anatids are vocal birds, producing a range of quacks, honks, squeaks, and trumpeting sounds, depending on species; the female often has a deeper voice than the male.

Anatids are generally herbivorous as adults, feeding on various water-plants, although some species also eat fish, molluscs, or aquatic arthropods. One group, the mergansers, are primarily piscivorous, and have serrated bills to help them catch fish. In a number of species, the young include a high proportion of invertebrates in their diets, but become purely herbivorous as adults.

== Breeding ==
The anatids are generally seasonal and monogamous breeders. The level of monogamy varies within the family; many of the smaller ducks only maintain the bond for a single season and find a new partner the following year, whereas the larger swans, geese and some of the more territorial ducks maintain pair bonds over a number of years, and even for life in some species. However, forced extrapair copulation among anatids is common, occurring in 55 species in 17 genera.

Anatidae is a large proportion of the 3% of bird species to possess a penis, though they vary significantly in size, shape, and surface elaboration. Most species are adapted for copulation on the water only. They construct simple nests from whatever material is close at hand, often lining them with a layer of down plucked from the mother's breast. In most species, only the female incubates the eggs. The young are precocial, and are able to feed themselves from birth. One aberrant species, the black-headed duck, is an obligate brood parasite, laying its eggs in the nests of gulls and coots. While this species never raises its own young, a number of other ducks occasionally lay eggs in the nests of conspecifics (members of the same species) in addition to raising their own broods.

== Relationship with humans ==
Duck, eider, and goose feathers and down have long been popular for bedspreads, pillows, sleeping bags, and coats. The members of this family also have long been used for food.

Humans have had a long relationship with ducks, geese, and swans; they are important economically and culturally to humans, and several duck species have benefited from an association with people. However, some anatids are agricultural pests, and have acted as vectors for zoonoses such as avian influenza.

Since 1600, five species of ducks have become extinct due to the activities of humans, and subfossil remains have shown that humans caused numerous extinctions in prehistory. Today, many more are considered threatened. Most of the historic and prehistoric extinctions were insular species, vulnerable due to small populations (often endemic to a single island), and island tameness. Evolving on islands that lacked predators, these species lost antipredator behaviours, as well as the ability to fly, and were vulnerable to human hunting pressure and introduced species. Other extinctions and declines are attributable to overhunting, habitat loss and modification, and hybridisation with introduced ducks (for example the introduced ruddy duck swamping the white-headed duck in Europe). Numerous governments and conservation and hunting organisations have made considerable progress in protecting ducks and duck populations through habitat protection and creation, laws and protection, and captive-breeding programmes.

== Systematics ==
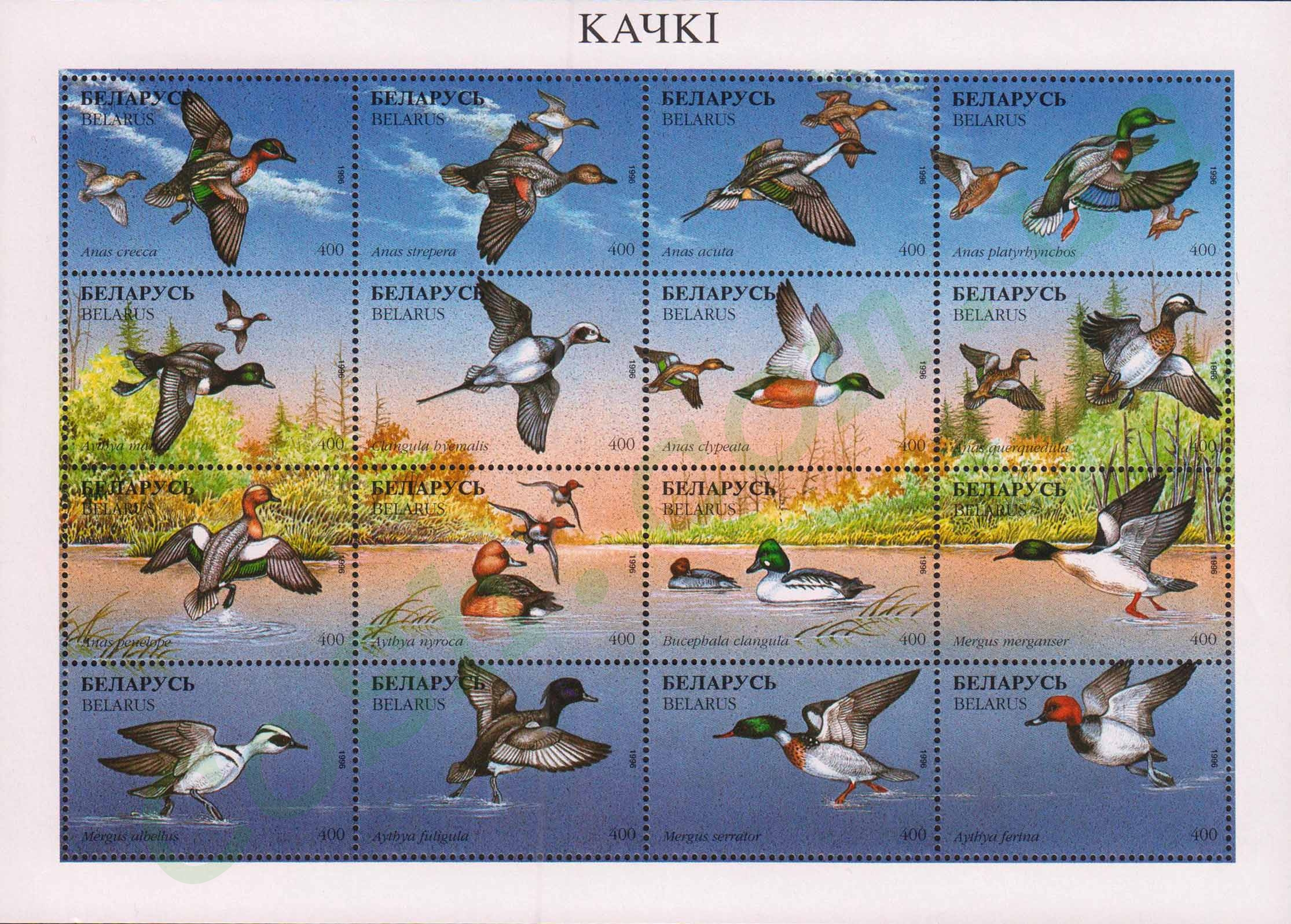
Anatidae: Eurasian teal (Anas crecca), gadwall (Anas strepera), northern pintail (Anas acuta), mallard (Anas platyrhynchos), greater scaup (Aythya marila), long-tailed duck (Clangula hyemalis), northern shoveler (Anas clypeata), garganey (Anas querquedula), Eurasian wigeon (Anas penelope), ferruginous duck (Aythya nyroca), common goldeneye (Bucephala clangula), common merganser (Mergus merganser), smew (Mergellus albellus), tufted duck (Aythya fuligula), red-breasted merganser (Mergus serrator), common pochard (Aythya ferina). Post of Belarus, 1996.

=== History of classification ===
The name Anatidae for the family was introduced by the English zoologist William Elford Leach in a guide to the contents of the British Museum published in 1819. While the status of the Anatidae as a family is straightforward, and which species properly belong to it is little debated, the relationships of the different tribes and subfamilies within it are poorly understood.

The systematics of the Anatidae are in a state of flux. Previously divided into six subfamilies, a study of anatomical characters by Livezey suggests the Anatidae are better treated in nine subfamilies. This classification was popular in the late 1980s to 1990s. But mtDNA sequence analyses indicate, for example, the dabbling and diving ducks do not belong in the same subfamily.

While a comprehensive review of the Anatidae which unites all evidence into a robust phylogeny is still lacking, the reasons for the confusing data are at least clear: As demonstrated by the Late Cretaceous fossil Vegavis iaai—an early modern waterbird which belonged to an extinct lineage—the Anatidae are an ancient group among the modern birds. Their earliest direct ancestors, though not documented by fossils yet, likewise can be assumed to have been contemporaries with the non-avian dinosaurs. The long period of evolution and shifts from one kind of waterbird lifestyle to another have obscured many plesiomorphies, while apparent apomorphies are quite often the result of parallel evolution, for example the "non-diving duck" type displayed by such unrelated genera as Dendrocygna, Amazonetta, and Cairina.

Alternatively, the Anatidae may be considered to consist of three subfamilies (ducks, geese, and swans, essentially) which contain the groups as presented here as tribes, with the swans separated as subfamily Cygninae, the goose subfamily Anserinae also containing the whistling ducks, and the Anatinae containing all other clades.

== Genera ==
For the living and recently extinct members of each genus, see the article List of Anatidae species.

- Subfamily: Dendrocygninae (one pantropical genus, of distinctive long-legged goose-like birds)
  - Dendrocygna, whistling ducks (8 living species)
  - Thalassornis, white-backed duck
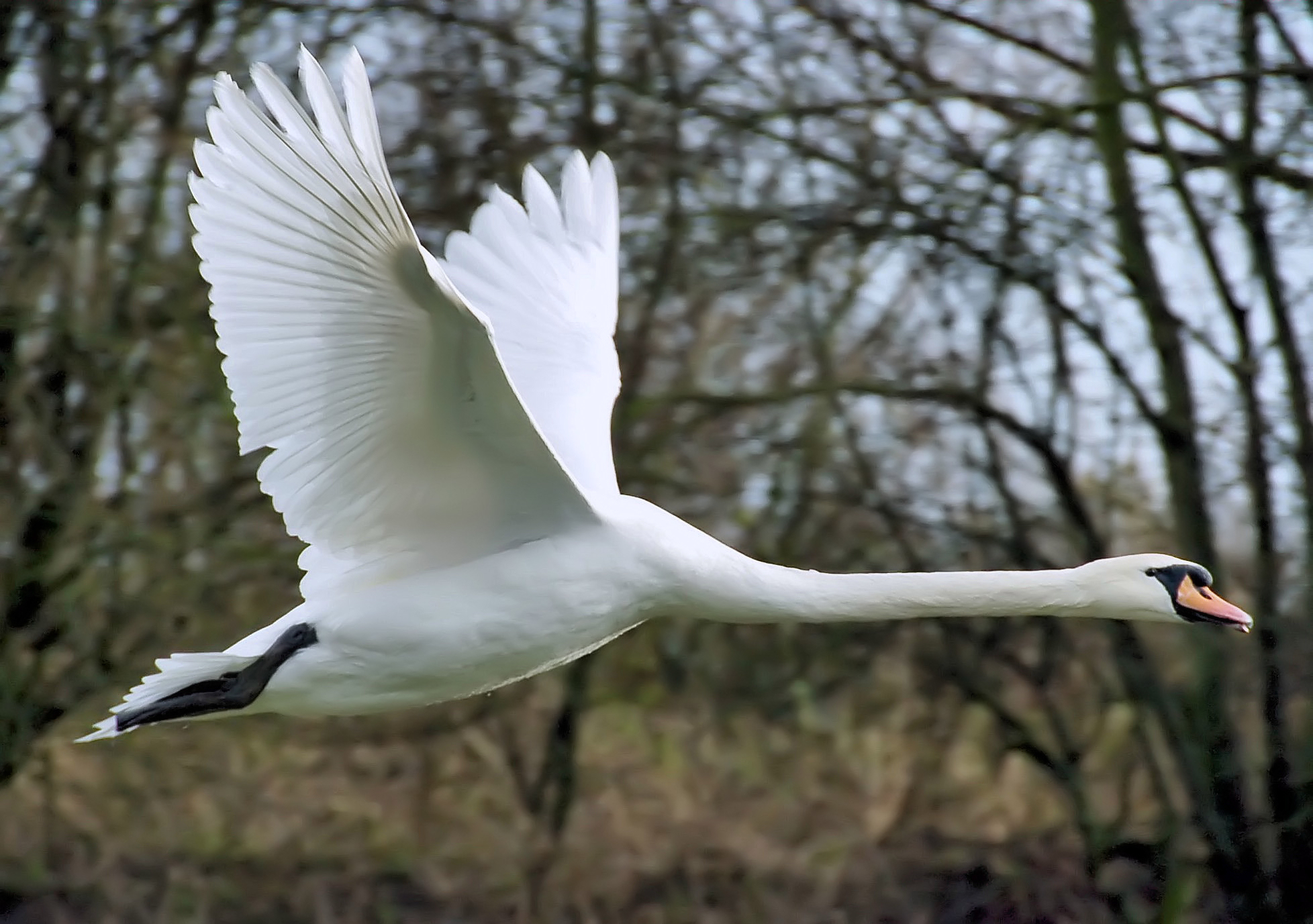
    Mute swan
- Subfamily: Anserinae, swans and geese (3–7 extant genera with 25–30 living species, mainly cool temperate Northern Hemisphere, but also some Southern Hemisphere species, with the swans in one genus [two genera in some treatments], and the geese in three genera [two genera in some treatments]. Some other species are sometimes placed herein, but seem somewhat more distinct [see below])
  - Cygnus, true swans (6 species, 4 sometimes separated in Olor)
  - Anser, grey geese and white geese (11 species)
  - Branta, black geese (6 living species)
- Subfamily: Stictonettinae (one genus in Australia, formerly included in the Oxyurinae, but with anatomy suggesting a distinct ancient lineage perhaps closest to the Anserinae, especially the Cape Barren goose)
  - Stictonetta, freckled duck
- Subfamily: Plectropterinae (one genus in Africa, formerly included in the "perching ducks", but closer to the Tadorninae)
  - Plectropterus, spur-winged goose
- Subfamily: Tadorninae – shelducks and sheldgeese
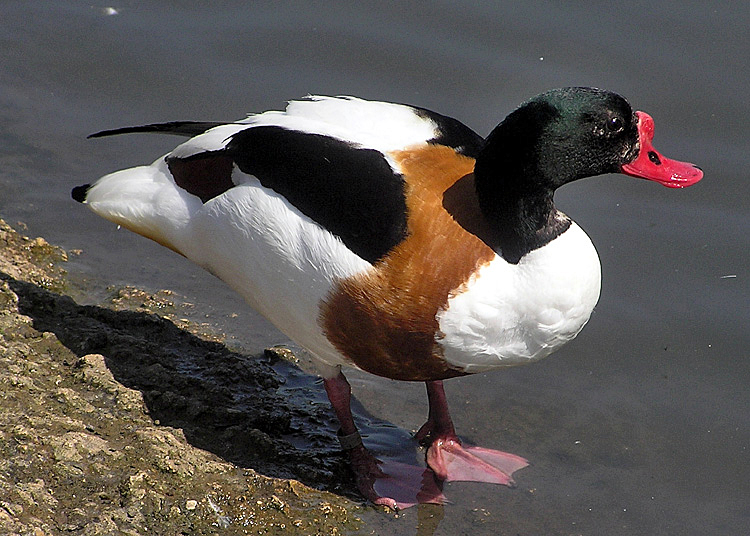
  Male common shelduck
  (This group of larger, often semiterrestrial waterfowl can be seen as intermediate between Anserinae and Anatinae. The 1986 revision has resulted in the inclusion of 10 extant genera with about two-dozen living species [one probably extinct] in this subfamily, mostly from the Southern Hemisphere but a few in the Northern Hemisphere; the affiliations of several presumed tadornine genera has later been questioned and the group in the traditional lineup is likely to be paraphyletic.)
  - Tadorna, shelducks (6 species, 1 probably extinct) – possibly paraphyletic
  - Radjah, Radjah shelduck
  - Salvadorina, Salvadori's teal
  - Centrornis, Madagascar sheldgoose (prehistoric, tentatively placed here)
  - Alopochen, Egyptian goose and Mascarene shelducks (1 living species, 2 extinct)
  - Neochen, (2 species)
  - Chloephaga, sheldgeese (4 species)
  - Hymenolaimus, blue duck
  - Merganetta, torrent duck

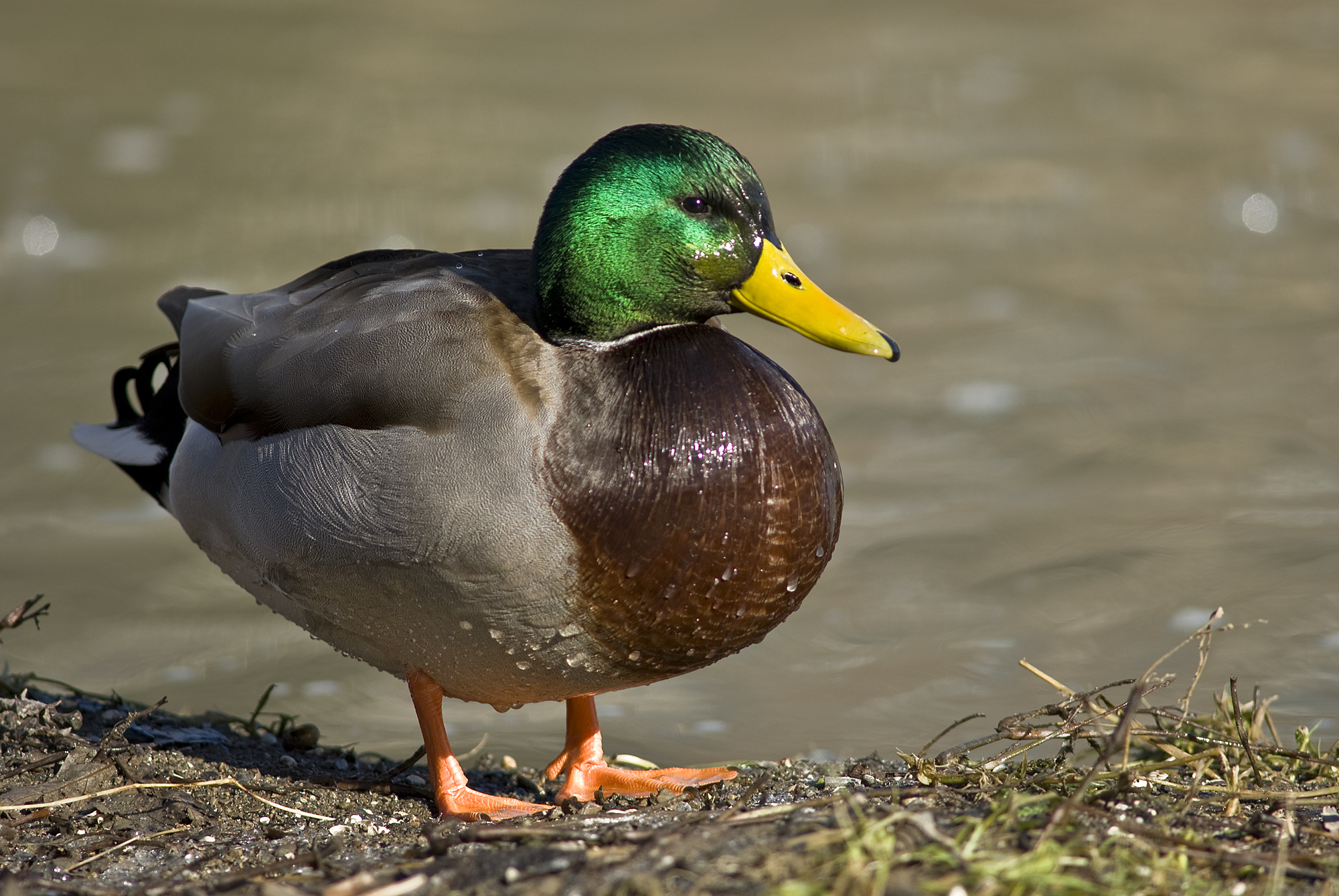
A male mallard duck

- Subfamily: Aythyinae, diving ducks (Some 15 species of diving ducks, of worldwide distribution, in two to four genera; The 1986 morphological analysis suggested the probably extinct pink-headed duck of India, previously treated separately in Rhodonessa, should be placed in Netta, but this has been questioned. Furthermore, while morphologically close to dabbling ducks, the mtDNA data indicate a treatment as distinct subfamily is indeed correct, with the Tadorninae being actually closer to dabbling ducks than the diving ducks)
  - Netta, red-crested pochard and allies (4 species, 1 probably extinct)
  - Aythya, pochards, scaups, etc. (12 species)
- Subfamily: Anatinae, dabbling ducks and moa-nalos (The dabbling duck group, of worldwide distribution, were previously restricted to just one or two genera, but had been extended to include eight extant genera and about 55 living species, including several genera formerly known as the "perching ducks"; mtDNA on the other hand confirms that the genus Anas is over-lumped and casts doubt on the diving duck affiliations of several genera [see below]. The moa-nalos, of which four species in three genera are known to date, are a peculiar group of flightless, extinct anatids from the Hawaiian Islands. Gigantic in size and with massive bills, they were believed to be geese, but have been shown to be actually very closely related to mallards. They evolved filling the ecological niche of turtles, ungulates, and other megaherbivores.
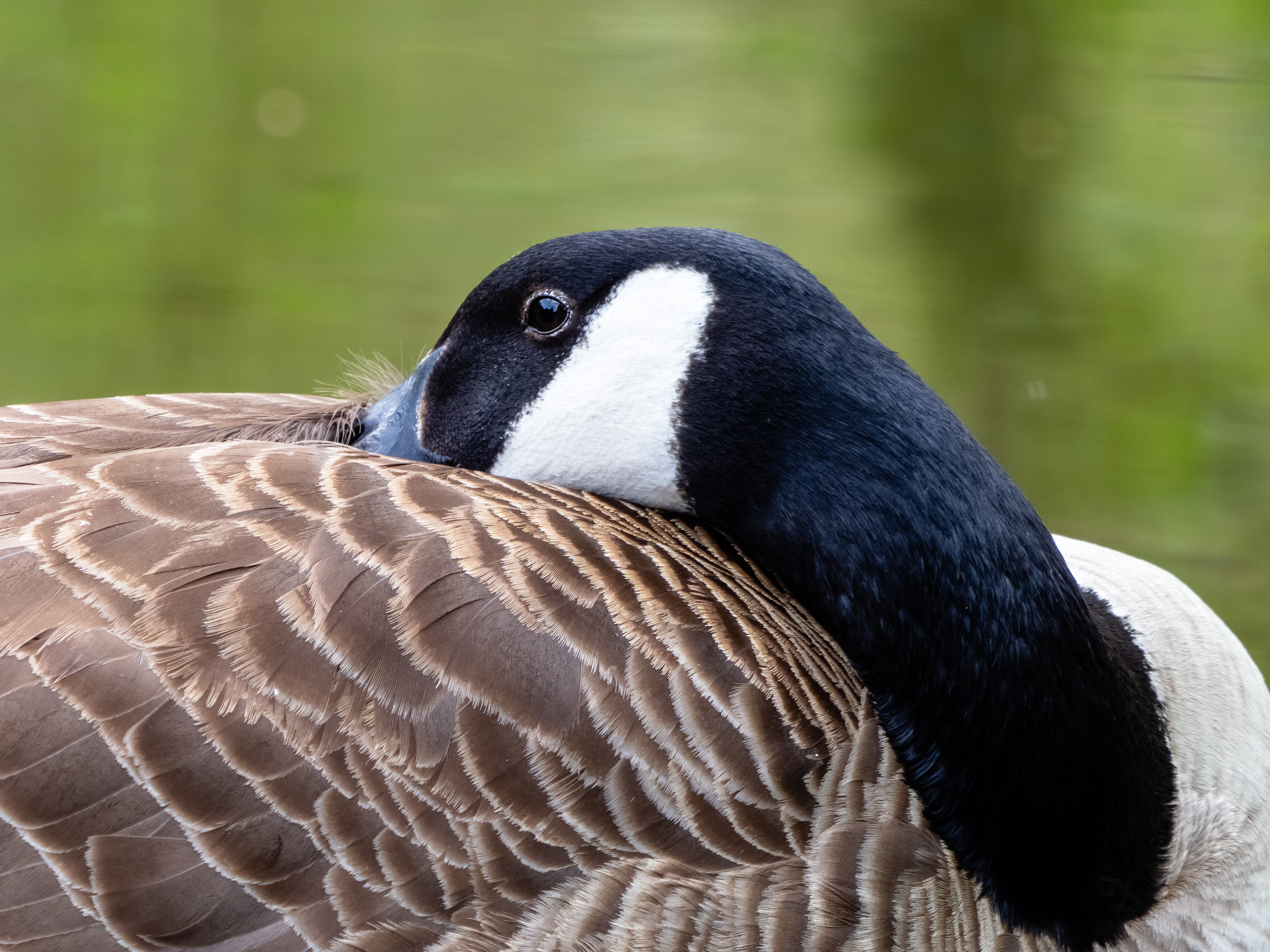
  A Canada goose tucking its bill under its wing
  - Anas: pintails, mallards, etc. (40–50 living species, 3 extinct)
  - Chendytes, diving-geese (extinct c. 450–250 BCE, A basal member of the dabbling duck clade)
  - Spatula, shovelers
  - Mareca, wigeons and gadwalls
  - Lophonetta, crested duck
  - Speculanas, bronze-winged duck
  - Amazonetta, Brazilian teal
  - Sibirionetta, Baikal teal
  - Chelychelynechen, turtle-jawed moa-nalo (prehistoric)
  - Thambetochen, large-billed moa-nalos (2 species, prehistoric)
  - Ptaiochen, small-billed moa-nalo (prehistoric)
- Tribe: Mergini, eiders, scoters, sawbills and other sea-ducks
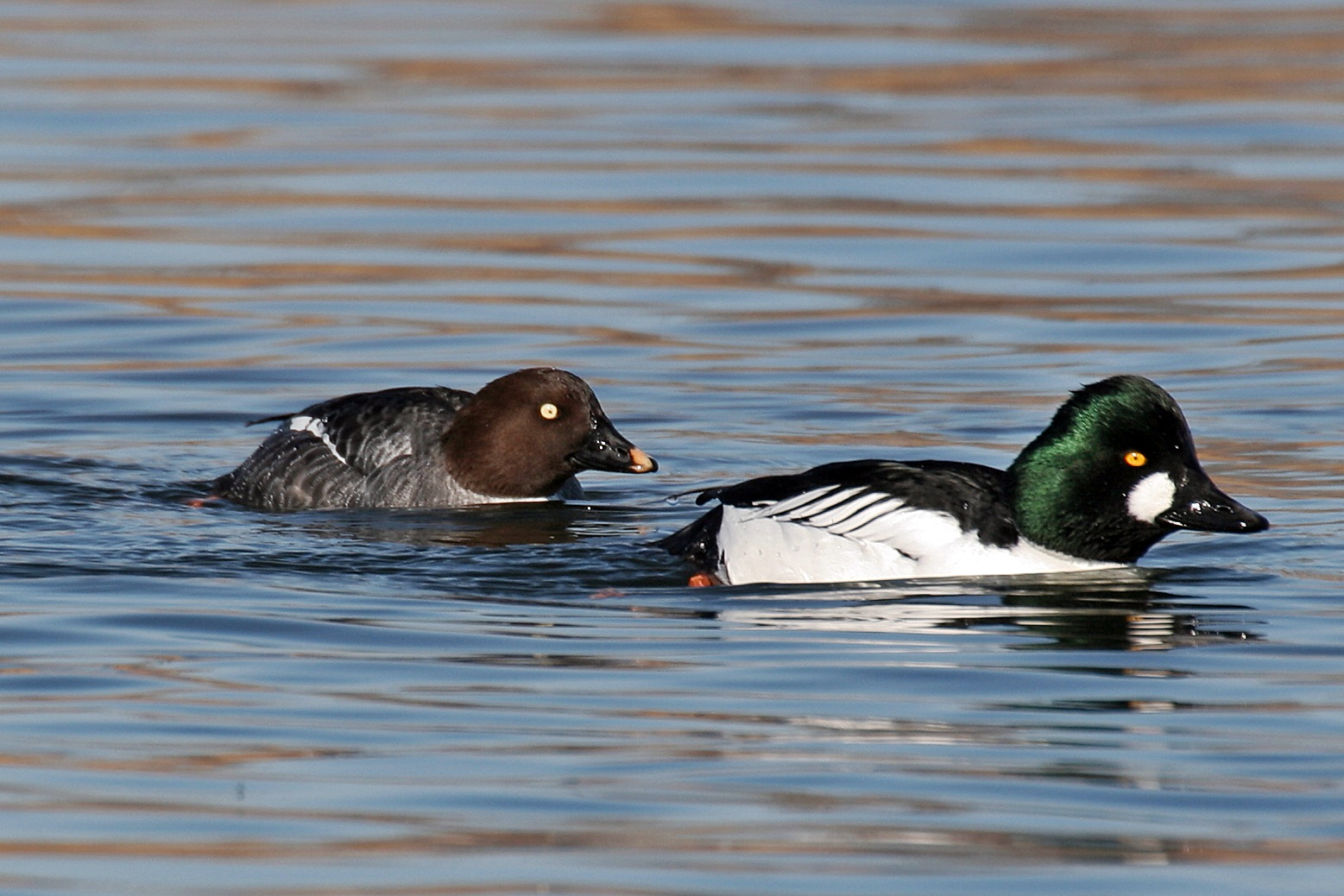
  Common goldeneye couple, male on the right
  (There are 9 extant genera and some 20 living species; most of this group occur in the Northern Hemisphere, but a few [mostly extinct] mergansers in the Southern Hemisphere)
  - Shiriyanetta (prehistoric)
  - Polysticta, Steller's eider
  - Somateria, eiders (3 species)
  - Histrionicus, harlequin duck (includes Ocyplonessa)
  - Camptorhynchus, Labrador duck (extinct)
  - Melanitta, scoters (6 species)
  - Clangula, long-tailed duck (1 species)
  - Bucephala, goldeneyes (3 species)
  - Mergellus, smew
  - Lophodytes, hooded merganser
  - Mergus, mergansers (4 living species, 1 extinct).
- Tribe: Oxyurini, stiff-tail ducks (a small group of 3–4 genera, 2–3 of them monotypic, with 7–8 living species)
  - Oxyura, stiff-tailed ducks (5 living species)
  - Nomonyx, masked duck
  - Heteronetta, black-headed duck
- Unresolved: The largest degree of uncertainty concerns whether a number of genera are closer to the shelducks or to the dabbling ducks.
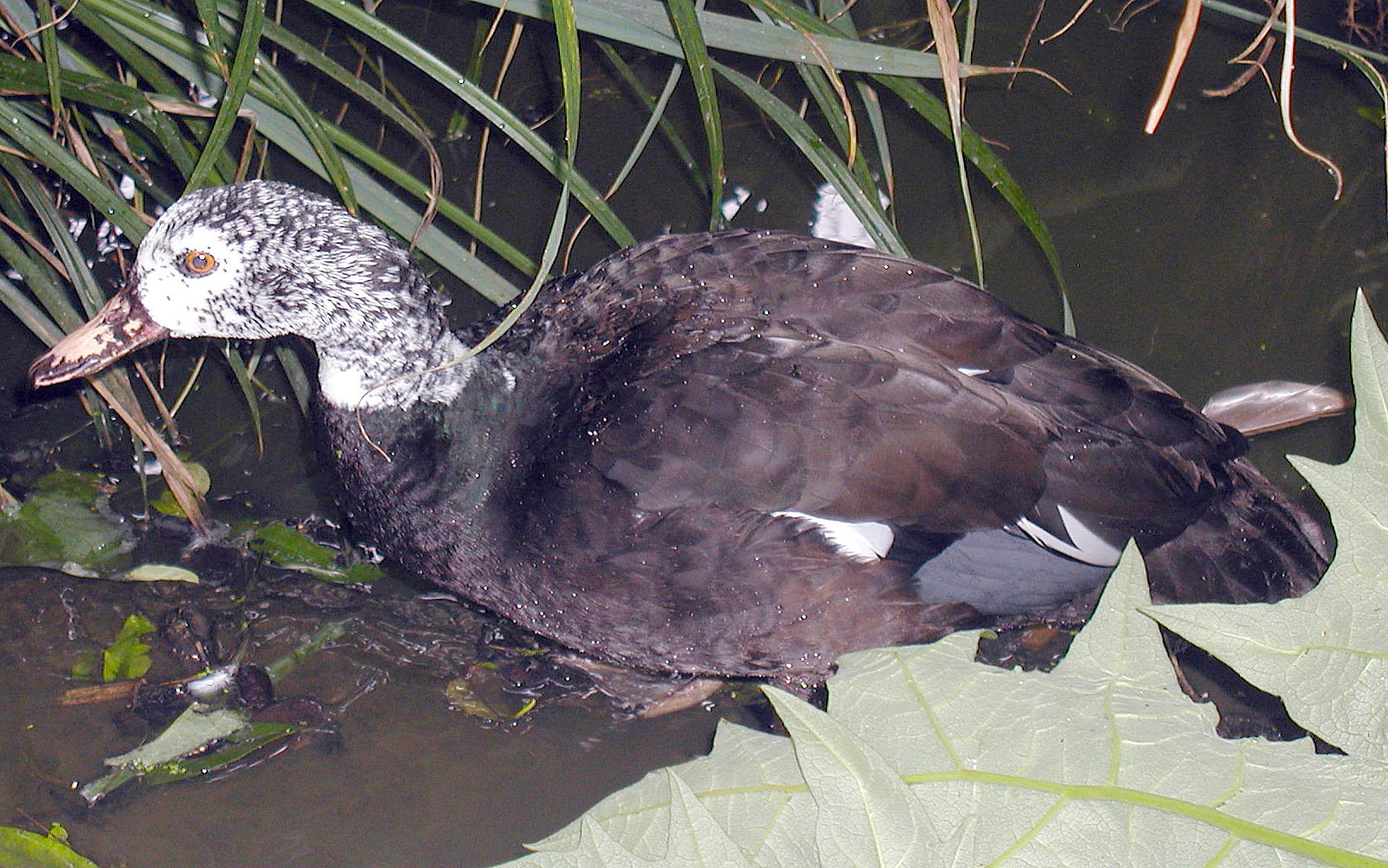
  The rare white-winged duck, a species of unclear affiliation
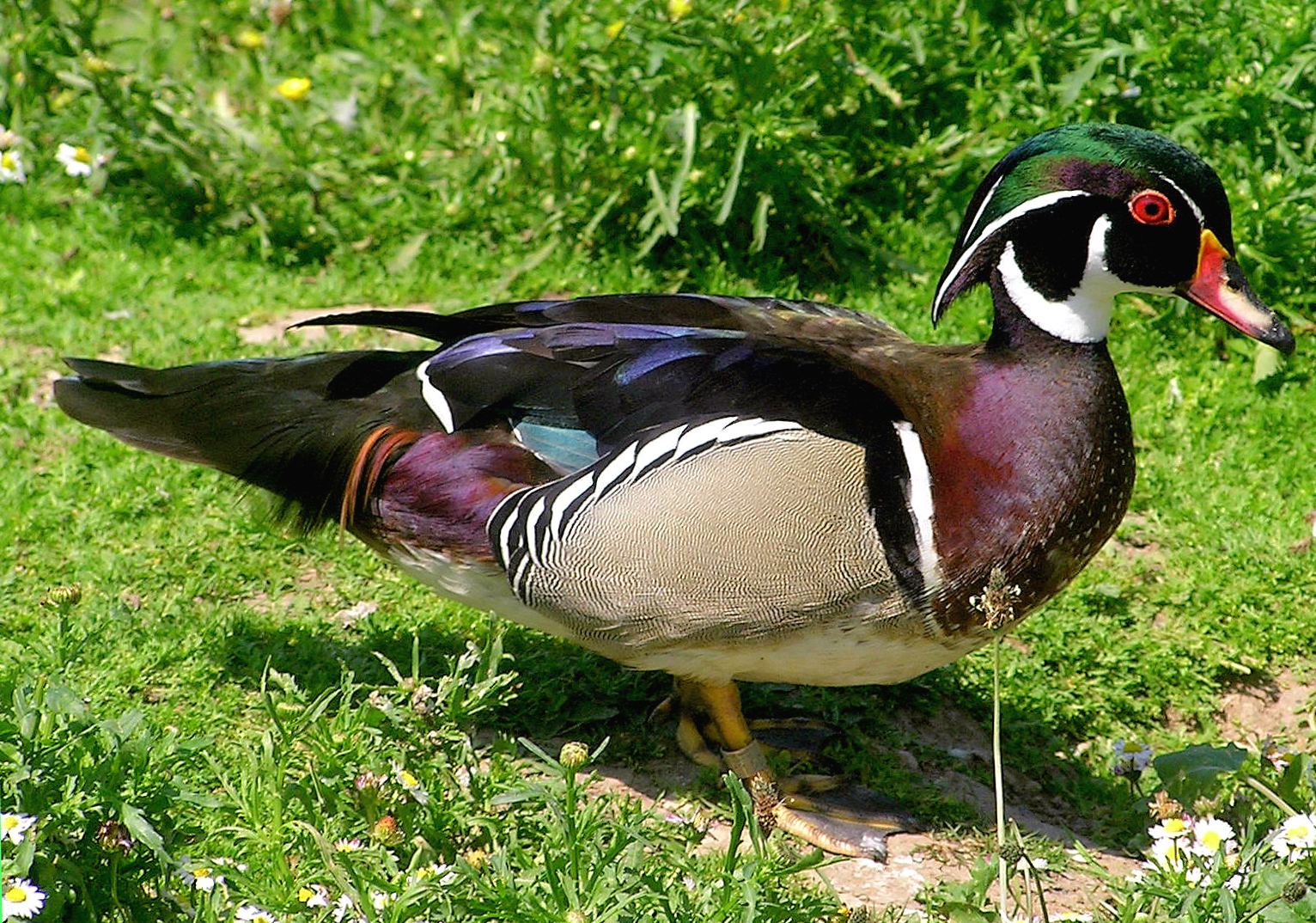
  Wood duck Aix sponsa
  See also the monotypic subfamilies above, and the "perching ducks"
  - Coscoroba, coscoroba swan – Anserinae or same subfamily as Cereopsis?
  - Cereopsis, Cape Barren goose – Anserinae, Tadorninae, or own subfamily?
  - Biziura, musk ducks (1 living species) - Oxyurini?
  - Cnemiornis, New Zealand geese (prehistoric) – as Cereopsis
  - Malacorhynchus, pink-eared ducks (1 living species) – Tadorninae, Oxyurinae or Dendrocheninae?
  - Sarkidiornis, comb duck – Tadorninae or closer to dabbling ducks?
  - Tachyeres, steamer ducks (4 species) – Tadorninae or closer to dabbling ducks?
  - Cyanochen, blue-winged goose – Tadorninae or more distant clade?
  - Nettapus, pygmy geese (3 species) – Anatinae or part of Southern Hemisphere radiation?
  - Pteronetta, Hartlaub's duck – traditionally dabbling ducks, but may be closer to Cyanochen
  - Cairina and Asarcornis, Muscovy duck and white-winged duck, respectively (2 species) – traditionally dabbling ducks, but may be paraphyletic, with one species in Tadorninae and the other closer to diving ducks
  - Aix, Mandarin duck and wood duck (2 species) – dabbling ducks or Tadorninae?
  - Callonetta, ringed teal – dabbling ducks or Tadorninae?
  - Chenonetta, maned duck (1 living species) – dabbling ducks or Tadorninae? Includes Euryanas.
  - Marmaronetta, marbled duck – formerly dabbling ducks; actually a diving duck or a distinct subfamily

=== Prehistoric species ===
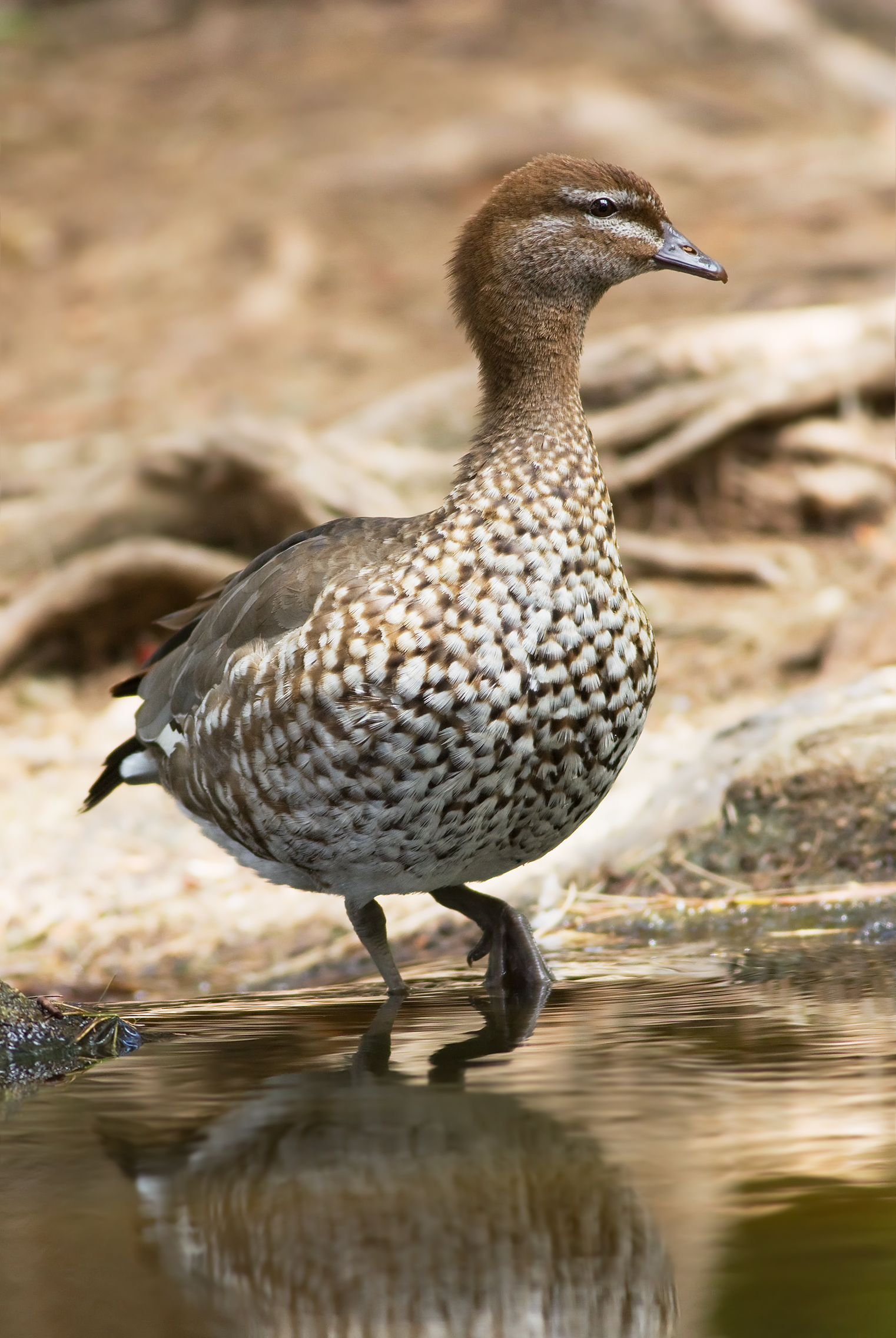
Maned duck is the only living member of the genus Chenonetta.

From subfossil bones found on Kauaʻi (Hawaiian Islands), two enigmatic waterfowl are known. The living and assignable prehistoric avifauna of the archipelago contains as Anseriformes Branta geese and their descendants, and the moa-nalos as mentioned above. The following taxa, although certainly new species, cannot be assigned even to subfamily; that Kauaʻi is the oldest of the large Hawaiian Islands, meaning the species may have been evolving in isolation for nearly 10 mya (since the Late Miocene), does not help in determining their affinities:

- Long-legged "shelduck", Anatidae sp. et gen. indet.
- Kaua'i mole duck, Talpanas lippa

Similarly, Branta rhuax from the Big Island of Hawaiʻi, and a gigantic goose-like anatid from Oʻahu are known only from very incomplete, and in the former case much damaged, bone fragments. The former has been alleged to be a shelduck, but this was generally dismissed because of the damage to the material and biogeographic considerations. The long-legged Kauaʻi bird, however, hints at the possibility of a former tadornine presence on the archipelago.

=== Fossil Anatidae ===
The fossil record of anatids is extensive, but many prehistoric genera cannot be unequivocally assigned to present-day subfamilies for the reasons given above. For prehistoric species of extant genera, see the respective genus accounts.

Dendrocheninae – a more advanced relative of the whistling-ducks or an ancestral relative of stifftail ducks paralleling whistling-ducks; if not extinct possibly belong in Oxyurinae (including Malacorhynchus)

- Mionetta (Late Oligocene – Middle Miocene of Central Europe and Kazakhstan) – includes "Anas" blanchardi, "A." consobrina, "A." natator, "Aythya" arvernensis
- Manuherikia (Bathans Early/Middle Miocene of Otago, New Zealand)
- Dendrochen (Early – Late? Miocene) – includes "Anas" integra, "A." oligocaena
- Dendrocheninae gen. et sp. indet. (Late Miocene of Argentina)

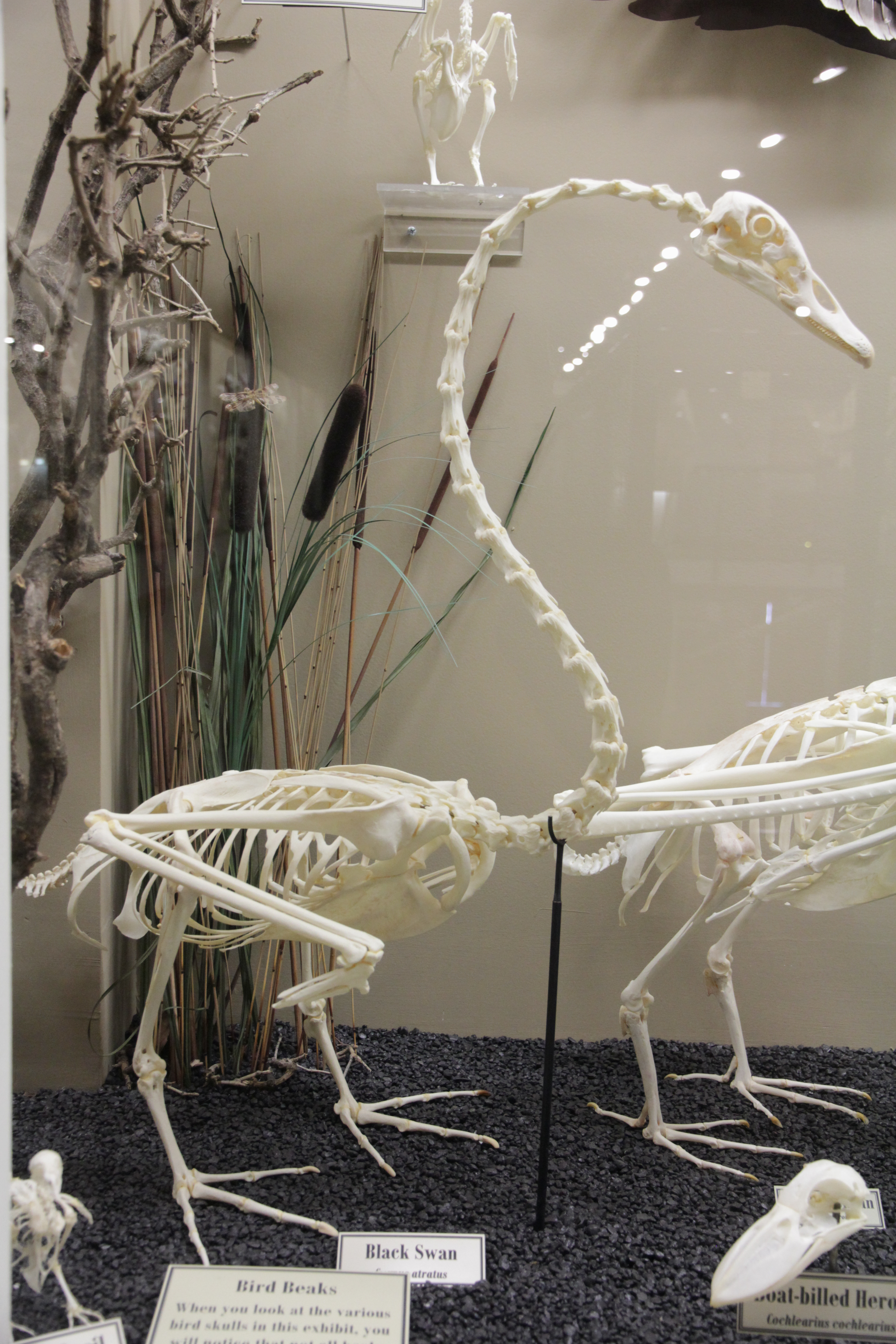
Black swan (Cygnus atratus) skeleton on display at the Museum of Osteology

Anserinae

- Cygnavus (Early Miocene of Germany)
- Cygnopterus (Middle Oligocene of Belgium – Early Miocene of France) – sometimes included in Cygnavus
- Megalodytes (Middle Miocene of California, US)
- "cf. Megalodytes" (Haraichi Middle Miocene of Annaka, Japan)
- Anserobranta (Late Miocene of C Europe) – includes "Anas" robusta, validity doubtful
- Presbychen (Temblor Late Miocene of Sharktooth Hill, US)
- Afrocygnus (Late Miocene – Early Pliocene of EC Africa)
- Paracygnus (Kimball Late Pliocene of Nebraska, US)
- Eremochen (Pliocene)

Tadorninae

- Australotadorna (Late Oligocene – Early Miocene of Australia)
- Miotadorna (Bathans Early/Middle Miocene of Otago, New Zealand)
- Tadorninae gen. et sp. indet. (Calvert Middle Miocene of Maryland, US)
- Balcanas (Early Pliocene of Dorkovo, Bulgaria) – may be synonym of Tadorna or even common shelduck
- Anabernicula (Late Pliocene ? – Late Pleistocene of SW and W North America)
- Brantadorna (Middle Pleistocene of Vallecito Creek, US)
- Nannonetta (Late Pleistocene of Peru)
- Zqueheanas (Miocene of Argentina)

Anatinae

- Sinanas (Middle Miocene of Shandong Province, China)
- Wasonaka (Middle Pliocene of Mexico)

Oxyurinae

- Dunstanetta (Bathans Early/Middle Miocene of Otago, New Zealand) – tentatively placed here
- Lavadytis (Miocene of Nevada, USA)
- Pinpanetta (Late Oligocene – Early Miocene of Australia)
- Tirarinetta (Pliocene of Australia)

Incertae sedis

- Aldabranas (Late Pleistocene of Aldabra, Indian Ocean) – anatine or tadornine* "Anas" albae (Late Miocene of Polgárdi, Hungary) – mergine? Formerly in Mergus
- Allgoviachen (Late Miocene of Bavaria, Germany)
- "Anas" eppelsheimensis (Early Pliocene of Eppelsheim, Germany) – anatine?
- "Anas" isarensis (Late Miocene of Aumeister, Germany) – anatine?
- "Anas" luederitzensis (Kalahari Early Miocene of Lüderitzbucht, Namibia) – anatine?
- "Anas" meyerii (Middle Miocene of Öhningen, Germany) Described from a single badly crushed tarsometatarsus and phalanges. This species was named in 1867 by Milne-Edwards and then recombined in 1964 by Brodkorb to the genus Aythya. This species is currently regarded as Aves incertae sedis.
- Ankonetta larriestrai (Miocene of Argentina)
- "Anser" scaldii (Late Miocene of Antwerp, Belgium) – anserine or tadornine* Anatidae gen. et sp. indet. (Waite Late Miocene of Alcoota, Australia) – anatine, oxyurine?
- "Anas" velox (Middle–Late? Miocene of C Europe) – anatine? May include "A." meyerii
- Anatidae gen. et sp. indet. (Waite Late Miocene of Alcoota, Australia) – tadornine?
- Anatidae gen. et sp. indet. MNZ S42797 (Bathans Early/Middle Miocene of Otago, New Zealand)
- Anatidae gen. et sp. indet. (Middle Miocene of Nördlinger Ries, Germany) – tadornine?
- Anatidae gen. et sp. indet. (Sajóvölgyi Middle Miocene of Mátraszõlõs, Hungary)
- "Aythya" chauvirae (Middle Miocene of Sansan, France and Credinţa, Romania) – 2 species
- Caerulonettion (Early Miocene of France and the Czech Republic, Middle Miocene of Germany)
- Cayaoa (Early Miocene of Argentina)
- "Chenopis" nanus (Pleistocene of Australia) – at least 2 taxa, may be living species
- Garganornis (Late Miocene of Gargano, Italy)
- Gracanicanetta (Middle Miocene of Bosnia and Herzegovina)
- Lavanttalornis (Middle Miocene of Austria)
- Matanas (Bathans Early/Middle Miocene of Otago, New Zealand)
- Mioquerquedula (Middle Miocene of Mongolia)
- "Oxyura" doksana (Early Miocene of Dolnice, Czech Republic)
- Protomelanitta (Middle Miocene of Mongolia and Nevada, USA)
- Uyrekura (Early Oligocene of Kazakhstan)

Putative or disputed prehistoric anatids are:

- Romainvillia (Late Eocene/Early Oligocene) – anseranatid or anatid (own subfamily)
- Loxornis (Deseado Early Oligocene of Argentina)
- Paracygnopterus (Early Oligocene of Belgium and England)
- Teleornis (Deseado Early Oligocene of Argentina)
- Guguschia (Late Oligocene of Pirəkəşkül, Azerbaijan) – anserine or Pelagornithidae (same as Caspiodontornis?)
- Chenornis (Early Miocene) – anserine or Phalacrocoracidae
- Paranyroca (Rosebud Early Miocene of Bennett County, US) – anatid (own subfamily) or distinct family?
- Eoneornis (Miocene of Argentina) – anatine? A nomen dubium
- Eutelornis (Miocene of Argentina) – anatine?

The Middle Oligocene Limicorallus (from Chelkar-Teniz (Kazakhstan) was sometimes considered an anserine. It is now recognized as a primitive cormorant. The middle Eocene Eonessa was formerly thought to belong to Anatidae, however reexamination of the holotype in 1978 resulted in the genus being placed as Aves incertae sedis.

== See also ==
- List of Anseriformes by population
