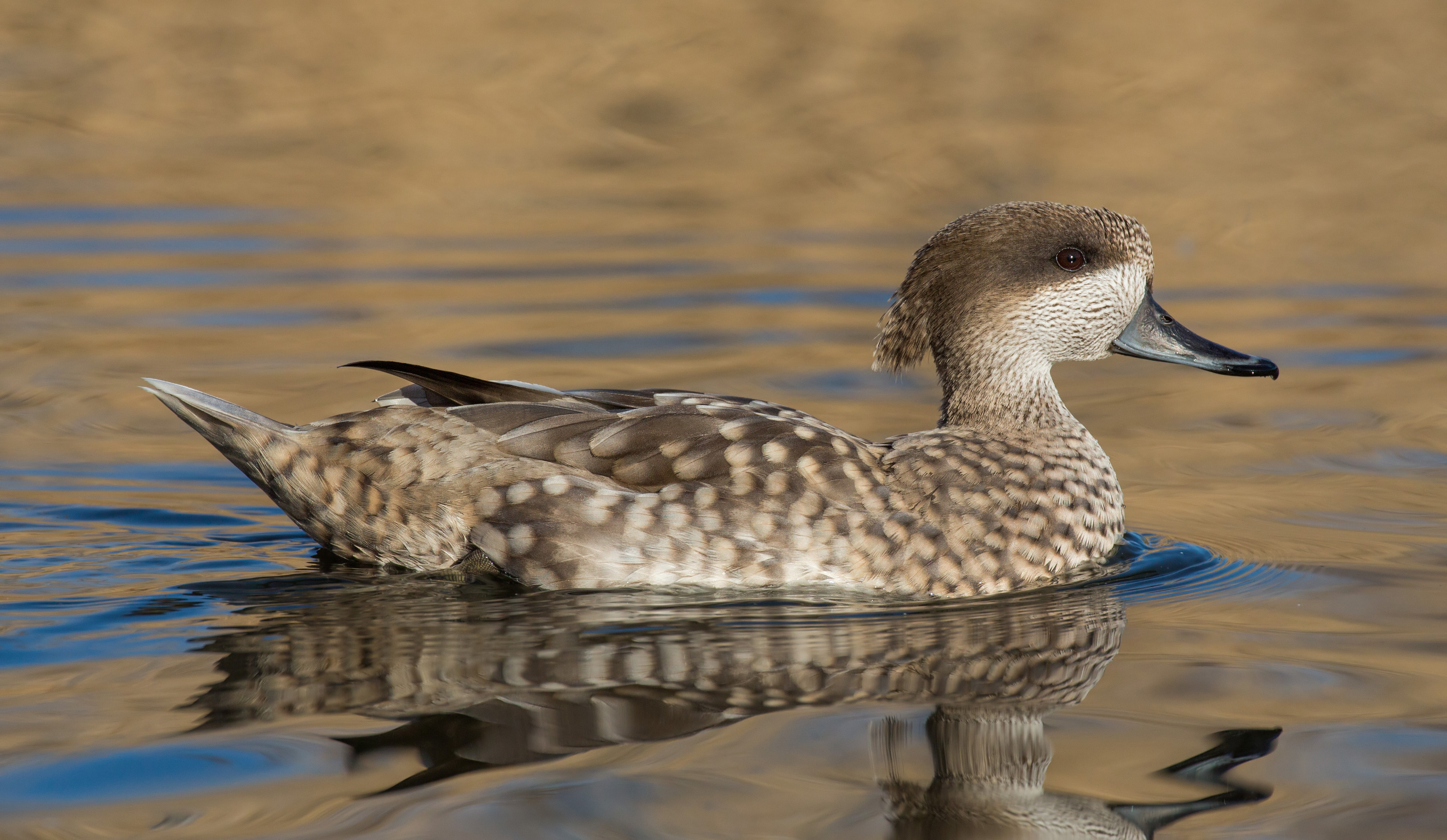

Conservation status
- Near Threatened (IUCN 3.1)

Scientific classification
- Kingdom: Animalia
- Phylum: Chordata
- Class: Aves
- Order: Anseriformes
- Family: Anatidae
- Genus: Marmaronetta; Reichenbach, 1853
- Species: M. angustirostris

Binomial name
- Marmaronetta angustirostris (Ménétriés, 1832)

= Marbled duck =

Species of bird

The marbled duck or marbled teal (Marmaronetta angustirostris) is a medium-sized species of duck from southern Europe, northern Africa, and western and central Asia. The scientific name, Marmaronetta angustirostris, comes from the Greek marmaros, marbled and netta, a duck, and Latin angustus, narrow or small and -rostris billed.

== Distribution, habitat and breeding ==
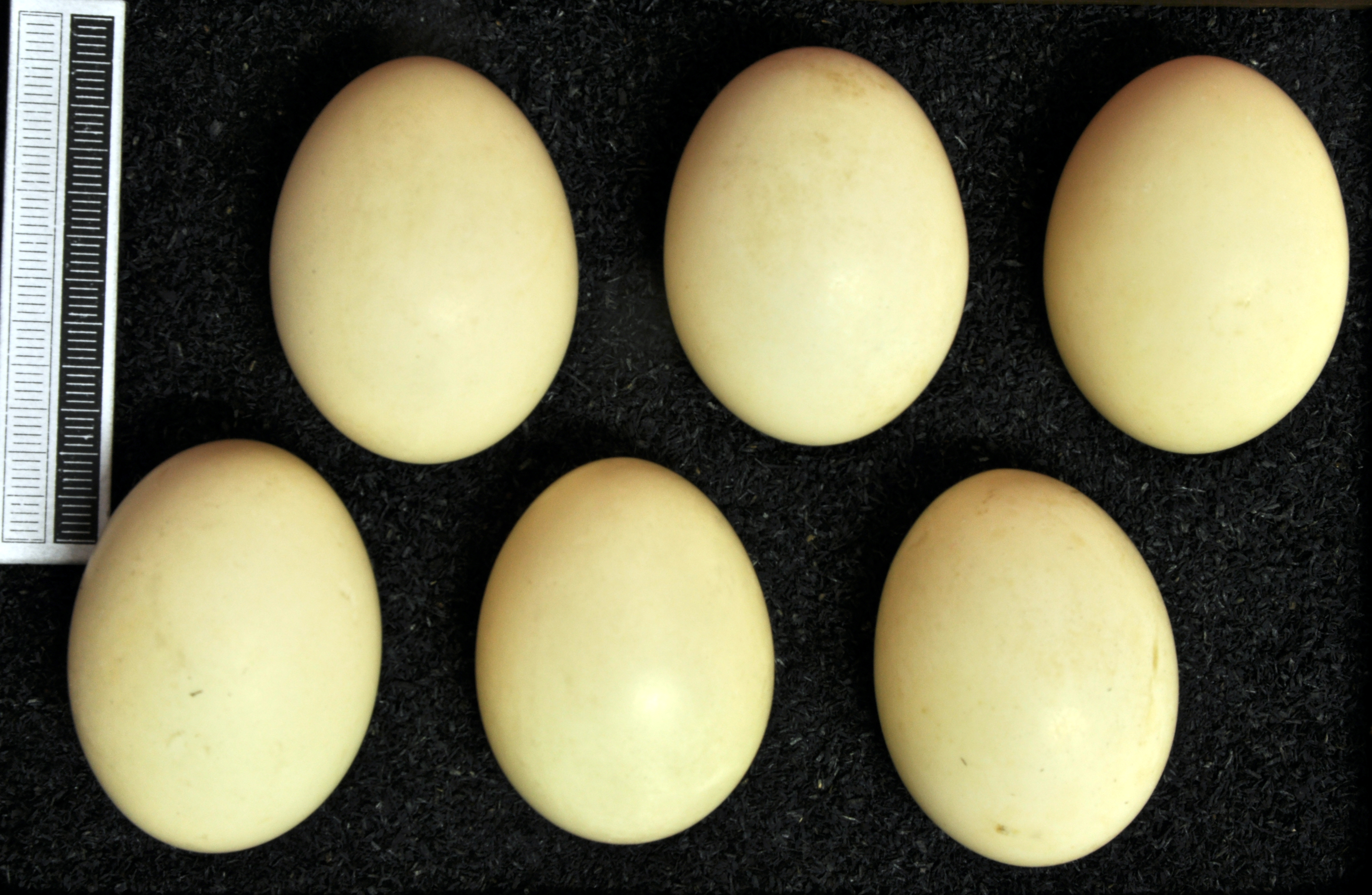
Eggs, Collection Museum Wiesbaden

This duck formerly bred in large numbers in the Mediterranean region, but is now restricted to a few sites in southern Spain, southern Italy, northwest Africa and the broader Levant. Further east it survives in the Mesopotamian marshland in southern Iraq and in Iran (Shadegan Marshes - the world's most important site), as well as isolated pockets in Armenia, Azerbaijan, South European Russia, western India and western China. In general the species has nomadic tendencies. In some areas birds disperse from the breeding grounds, and have been encountered in the winter period in the Sahel zone, south of the Sahara.

Its preferred breeding habitat is temporary and shallow fresh, brackish or alkaline waters with densely vegetated shores in regions that otherwise are fairly dry. It may also breed in coastal lagoons, along slow rivers or man-made waters like reservoirs. The on average c. 12 eggs are placed in a nest covered by dense vegetation at the waters edge. It is usually on the ground, but occasionally higher among reeds or on huts made from reeds. They are common in captive collections but are a nervous and flighty bird.

These are gregarious birds, at times even when nesting. Outside the breeding season flocks are often small, although large wintering flocks have been reported in some areas. The largest winter concentration known is in Khuzestan, Iran.

In 2011, a group of Iraqi ornithologists counted a single flock of the rare marbled teal on the lakes of the Iraqi marshes, numbering at least 40,000 birds.

== Description and diet ==
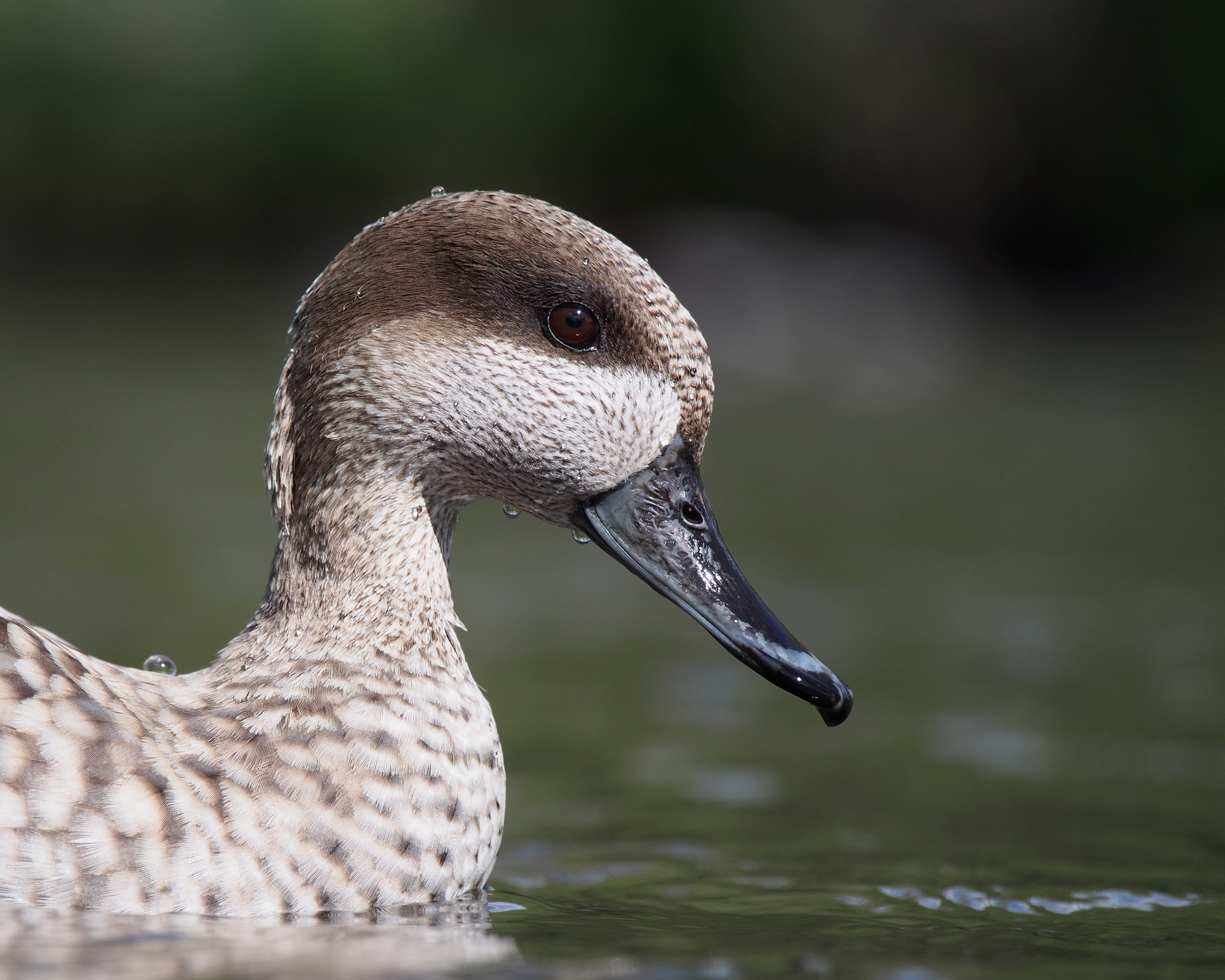
Close-up of head

The marbled duck is approximately 39–42 cm (15–17 in) long. Adults are a pale sandy-brown colour, diffusely blotched off-white, with a dark eye-patch and shaggy head. The female averages smaller than the male, but otherwise the sexes are alike. Juveniles are similar but with more off-white blotches. In flight, the wings look pale without a marked pattern, and no speculum on the secondaries.

These birds feed mainly in shallow water by dabbling or up-ending. Adults feed mostly on seeds (for example, from Scirpus and Ruppia), but also take significant quantities of invertebrates (especially aquatic insect larvae and pupae, tiny crustaceans, and—highly unusual for a duck—ants) and green plants (for example, Potamogeton). Their gizzard allows them to break down seeds and the lamellae in their beak allow them to filter feed on zooplanktonic organisms. Young marbled ducks feed mostly on invertebrates. Although they may take tiny seeds, they lack the large gizzard necessary to break down the larger seeds commonly consumed by adults.

== Conservation ==
This bird is considered near threatened by the IUCN due to a reduction in population caused by habitat destruction and hunting. It is one of the species to which the Agreement on the Conservation of African-Eurasian Migratory Waterbirds (AEWA) applies.
