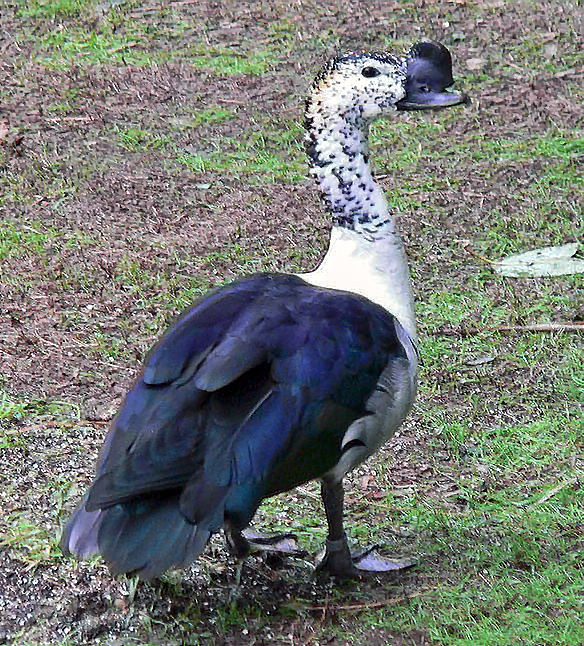
- Comb duck (Sarkidiornis sylvicola)

Scientific classification
- Kingdom: Animalia
- Phylum: Chordata
- Class: Aves
- Order: Anseriformes
- Family: Anatidae
- Subfamily: Tadorninae
- Genus: Sarkidiornis; Eyton, 1838

= Sarkidiornis =

Genus of birds

Sarkidiornis is a genus within the family Anatidae comprising two species that inhabit aquatic environments in tropical and subtropical regions of South America, Africa and southern Asia. Sarkidiornis is sometimes considered a monotypic genus with its sole member the knob-billed duck (S. melanotos), a cosmopolitan species.

== Taxonomy ==
This genus was first described in 1838 by Thomas Campbell Eyton. The type species, Anser melanotos (S. melanotos), was originally described in 1769 by Thomas Pennant, based on a bird collected in what is now Sri Lanka.

Etymologically, the term Sarkidiornis is derived from Greek, where sarkidion means "little meat" or "caruncle", and ornis means "bird". This name refers to the fleshy crest at the base of the male's beak.

Most taxonomic authorities, however, split the species into two:

Genus Sarkidiornis – Eyton, 1838 – two species
Common name	Scientific name and subspecies	Range	Size and ecology	IUCN status and estimated population
Knob-billed duck Male Female	Sarkidiornis melanotos (Pennant, 1769)	Sub-Saharan Africa, Madagascar and Southern Asia from Pakistan to Laos and extreme southern China	Size: Habitat: Diet:	LC
Comb duck Male Female	Sarkidiornis sylvicola (Ihering, HFA & Ihering, R, 1907)	eastern Paraguay, southeastern Brazil and extreme northeastern Argentina	Size: Habitat: Diet:	LC
