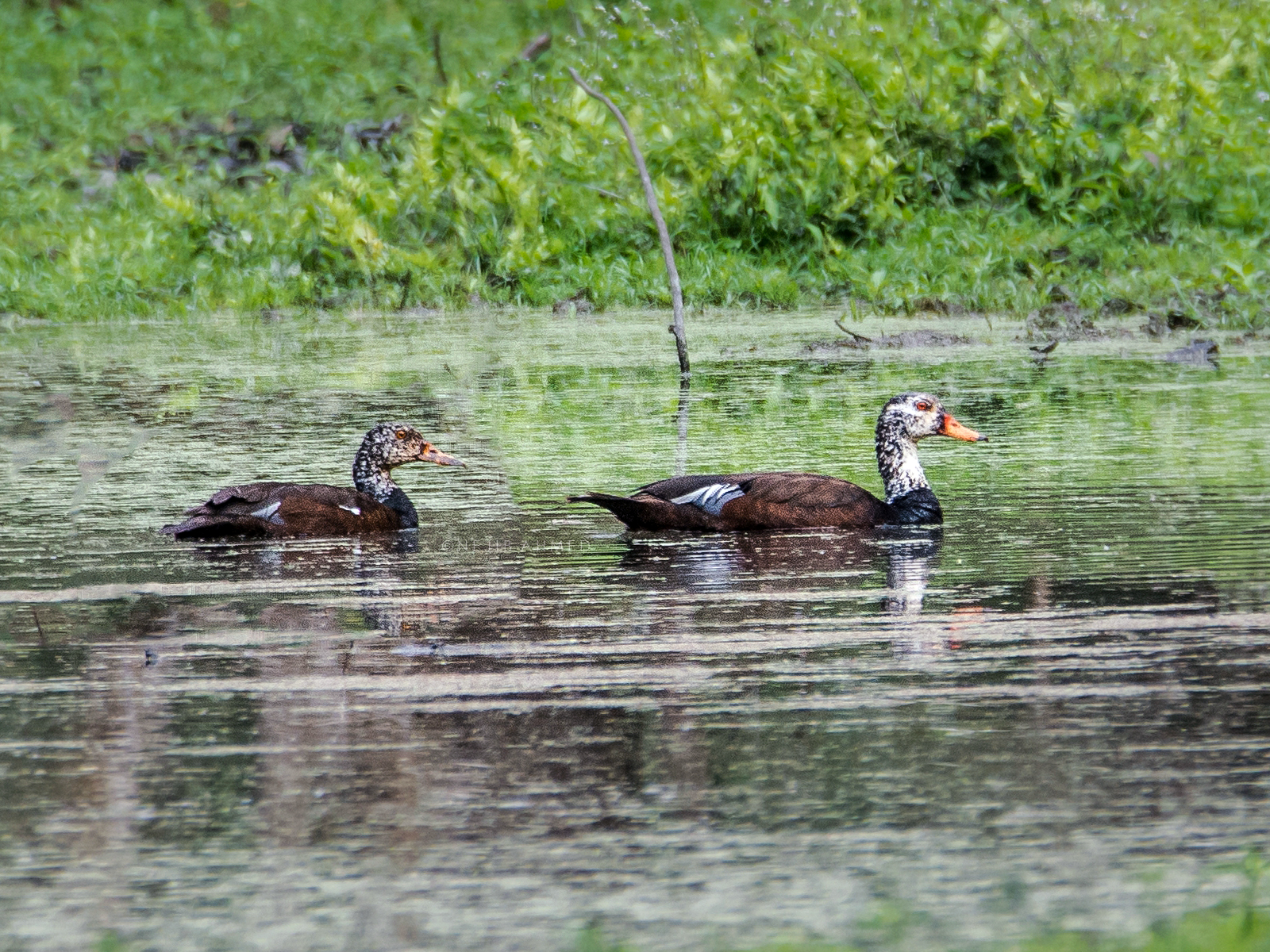
- Pair in Nameri National Park, Assam, India

Conservation status
- Critically Endangered (IUCN 3.1)
- CITES Appendix I

Scientific classification
- Kingdom: Animalia
- Phylum: Chordata
- Class: Aves
- Order: Anseriformes
- Family: Anatidae
- Genus: Asarcornis; Salvadori, 1895
- Species: A. scutulata

Binomial name
- Asarcornis scutulata (Müller, 1842)
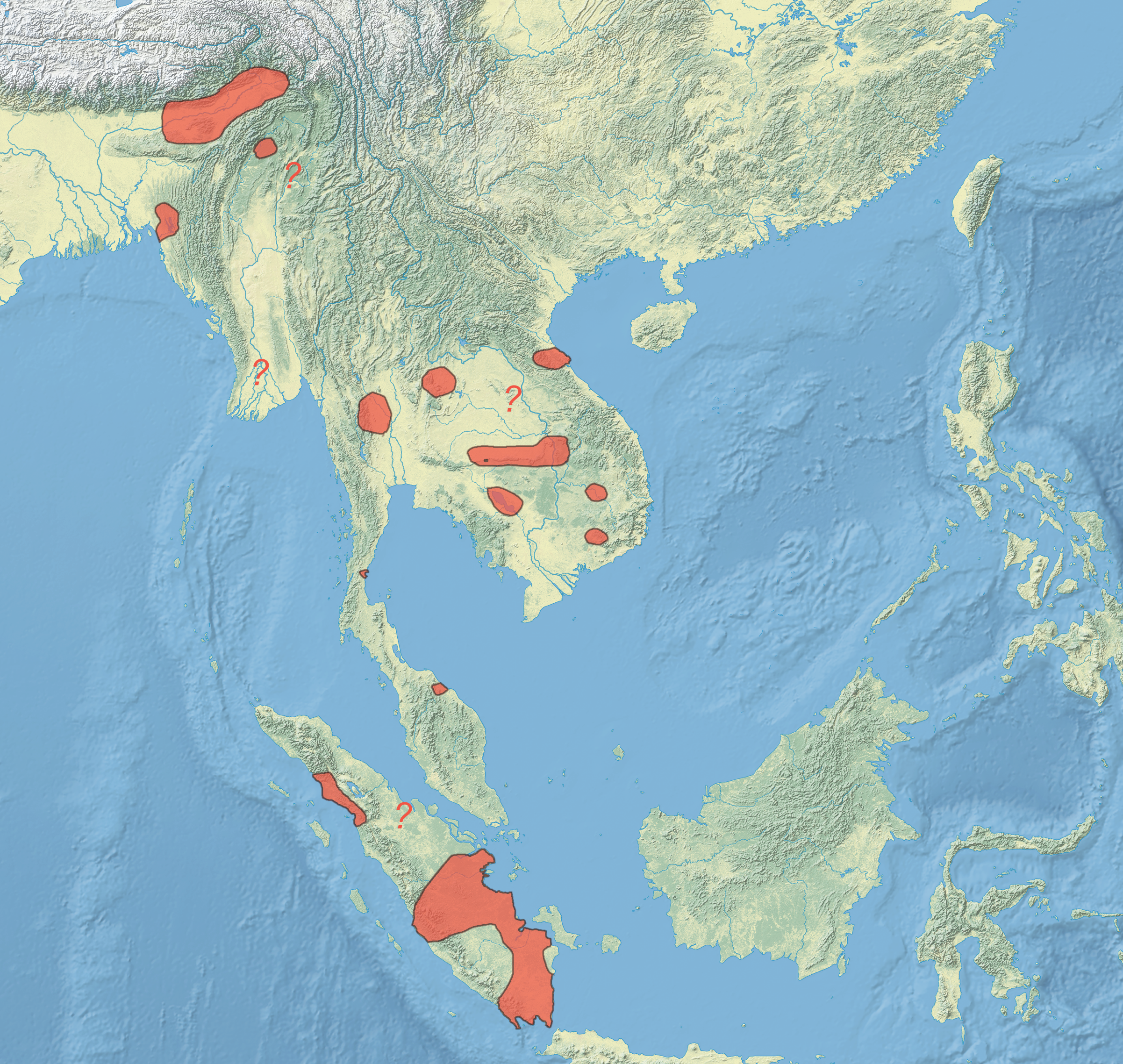

Synonyms
- Cairina scutulata

= White-winged duck =

Species of bird

The white-winged duck or white-winged wood duck (Asarcornis scutulata) is a large species of duck, formerly placed in the genus Cairina with the Muscovy duck (Cairina moschata) and considered allied to the dabbling ducks. However, two genetic studies have indicated that the anatomical similarity to the Muscovy duck is deceiving, with the species appropriately placed in a monotypic genus, as Asarcornis scutulata; it proved evolutionarily closest to a clade containing the diving duck genera Netta and Aythya, while Cairina resolved as close to the genus Aix in a very different part of the family tree.

== Description ==
This is one of the largest living species of duck next only to the steamer ducks which are heavier. The Muscovy duck also attains sizes that nearly rival the white-winged duck, but may average a bit smaller in a wild state. Length is 66–81 cm (26–32 in) and wingspan is 116–153 cm (46–60 in). Males weigh 2.94–3.9 kg (6.5–8.6 lb), while females weigh 1.95–3.05 kg (4.3–6.7 lb). The most noticeable feature on adult birds is the dark body contrasting with a whitish head and neck. Males have a mostly dull yellowish bill, blackish mottling on the head and upper neck, white lesser median coverts and inner edges of tertials, and bluish-grey secondaries. In flight, white wing-coverts contrast with the rest of the wings. Females are smaller and usually have more densely mottled head and upper neck. The juvenile is duller and browner.

This secretive species feeds mainly at dawn and dusk when moving between daytime roosts and feeding sites. It has been described as omnivorous, regularly consuming pondweed, small fish, aquatic snails, spiders and insects. It inhabits stagnant or slow-flowing natural and artificial wetlands, within or adjacent to evergreen, deciduous or swamp forests, on which it depends for roosting and nesting, usually in tree-holes. Although lowlands (below about 400 m) provide optimum habitat, it occurs up to 1,400 m, especially on plateaux supporting sluggish perennial rivers and pools. The breeding season varies across the range so that hatching coincides with the early wet season; clutch size ranges from 6 to 13 in captivity and 2 to 12 in the wild.

== Distribution ==
Historically the white-winged duck was widely distributed from northeastern India and Bangladesh, throughout South-East Asia to Java and Sumatra. It is now extinct on Java (no records for over 50 years) and probably extinct in Bangladesh, Lao PDR, Vietnam and Peninsular Malaysia. Extant populations remain in India (eastern Assam and adjacent Arunachal Pradesh), Myanmar (chiefly along the Chindwin River in Sagaing and Kachin states), Indonesia (remnant populations on Sumatra), Thailand (very few wild birds in remote western forests, plus a reintroduced population at Phu Khieo Wildlife Sanctuary of uncertain viability), and Cambodia (now only at Preah Vihear). Myanmar's Hukaung Valley Wildlife Sanctuary is regarded as probably the global stronghold.

In India the main protected areas holding the species are Nameri National Park and the Dihing–Patkai complex, with smaller populations in Namdapha National Park and several reserved forests; the species has, however, apparently disappeared from former strongholds such as Dibru-Saikhowa National Park and the Doomdooma–Dangori reserve forests, where large populations were recorded in the 1990s. The white-winged duck is the state bird of Assam.

== Conservation status ==
In the October 2024 IUCN Red List update (version 2024-2), the white-winged duck was uplisted from Endangered to Critically Endangered under criteria A2bcde+3bcde+4bcde and C1+2a(i), reflecting a global decline of an estimated 70–90% over the past three generations (26 years; 1997–2023). It had previously been listed as Endangered continuously since 1994.

=== Population ===
The global population is estimated at 150–450 mature individuals, with the true figure most plausibly at the lower end of this range. Approximate country totals from the 2024 assessment are:

- India: 50–150 mature individuals
- Myanmar: 40–100 mature individuals
- Sumatra (Indonesia): 30–60 mature individuals
- Cambodia: fewer than 50 mature individuals
- Thailand: very small numbers of wild birds, plus a non-self-sustaining reintroduced population

The species is presumed extinct or functionally extinct in Bangladesh, Lao PDR, Peninsular Malaysia, Vietnam and Java. Three generations ago the global population is suspected to have been around 800–1,400 mature individuals.

=== Threats ===
The rapid decline reflects loss, degradation and disturbance of forested riverine wetlands, compounded by hunting and collection of eggs and chicks. The species is particularly susceptible to the loss of large nesting trees with cavities. Threats vary by region: on Sumatra, near-total clearance of lowland forests for oil palm (and to a lesser extent rubber) plantations has been the principal driver, and was likely responsible for extirpation in Peninsular Malaysia and on Java. In Myanmar, deforestation and the proliferation of gold-mining in the Hukaung Valley are well-established threats. In north-east India, Ahmed et al. (2023) identified habitat degradation through oil-extraction industries, wetland siltation, invasive weed proliferation and wetland drainage as the main pressures, with disturbance from unregulated tourism and resource extraction also significant; hunting and nest robbery continue throughout the range. Hunting and nest-robbery are thought to have been the principal driver of extirpation in Lao PDR. Climate-change impacts are poorly understood; a regional study projected only minor habitat losses for the north-east Indian population by 2050.

=== Conservation actions ===
The species is listed on CITES Appendix I and on CMS Appendix II, and is legally protected in most range states; in India it is listed in Schedule I of the Wildlife Protection Act, 1972. BirdLife has identified 68 Important Bird Areas for the species, covering a network of about 69,800 km², although coverage by formal protected areas is generally low outside Myanmar and Cambodia. The State of India's Birds 2023 assessment lists it as a High Priority species.

In 2023, the Wildlife Trust of India and partners published a species action plan for Assam, Call of the Divine Duck, recommending strengthening of protected-area enforcement, restoration of forest wetlands through de-siltation and weed control, mitigation of disturbance, and community-engagement programmes; a species-recovery project is now underway. An EAZA ex-situ programme held 76 white-winged ducks across 23 European institutions as of 2023, while the North American captive population has collapsed from about 200 birds in 2000 to fewer than 25 by 2022 and is expected to be extinct by 2027. The species is held in some Asian institutions and by private aviculturalists, and a reintroduced population is regularly seen at Phu Khieo Wildlife Sanctuary, Thailand, although its long-term viability is unclear.

Earlier captive-breeding attempts at the Wildfowl and Wetlands Trust (WWT) Slimbridge, in the United Kingdom, received ten ducks from Thailand in 1955, but none reproduced and the last bird died in 1961, with most lost to avian tuberculosis to which the species appears particularly susceptible. The European and North American captive lines descend from ten birds collected in Assam in 1969–1970.
