= Naranbulagornis =

Naranbulagornis Temporal range: Late Paleocene

Scientific classification
- Kingdom: Animalia
- Phylum: Chordata
- Class: Aves
- Order: Anseriformes
- Genus: †Naranbulagornis; Zelenkov, 2018

Type species
- Naranbulagornis khun Zelenkov, 2018

Extinct genus of waterfowl

Naranbulagornis is an extinct monotypic genus of basal waterfowl. Its type and only known species, N. khun, is known from two Late Paleocene localities in Southern Mongolia.

== History and etymology ==
All known remains of Naranbulagornis were collected between 1970 and 1971 during the Joint Russian-Mongolian Paleontological Expedition in the Naran-Bulag and Tsagaan-Khushuu localities, both representing the Late Paleocene Naran Member of the Naran-Bulak Formation. The known material was described as the new genus and species Naranbulagornis khun in 2018 by Nikita Zelenkov. The genus name is formed from the prefix "Naranbulag", designing the name of the type locality, meaning "sunshine spring" in Mongolian, and the suffix "-ornis", meaning "bird". The species name, "khun", means "swan" in Mongolian.

== Description ==
Naranbulagornis was a quite large waterfowl, a fourth larger than the contemporary Anatalavis; it was presumably the largest anseriform of its time, reaching the size of the modern coscoroba swan. The holotype, the proximal end of a right carpometacarpus from Naran-Bulag, reached 58 mm in length; most notably, and contrarily to all other anseriforms, its pisiform process was positioned at the level of the proximal margin of the extensor process. The referred material, consisting in the distal fragment of a femur, was 61.1 mm long; despite the lack of overlapping material, it was referred to the genus due to its large size, similar to that of the Oligocene swan Cygnopterus. The presence of an elongate scar on the laterocaudal surface of the shaft is typical of all swimming anseriforms; it was particularly deep as in modern large ducks.

== Paleobiology ==
Naranbulagornis was a more proficient swimmer than the teal-sized presbyornithid that lived in its environment; similarities are quite important with modern swans, suggesting similar ways of moving through water and land. It may not have been as specialized for diving.
