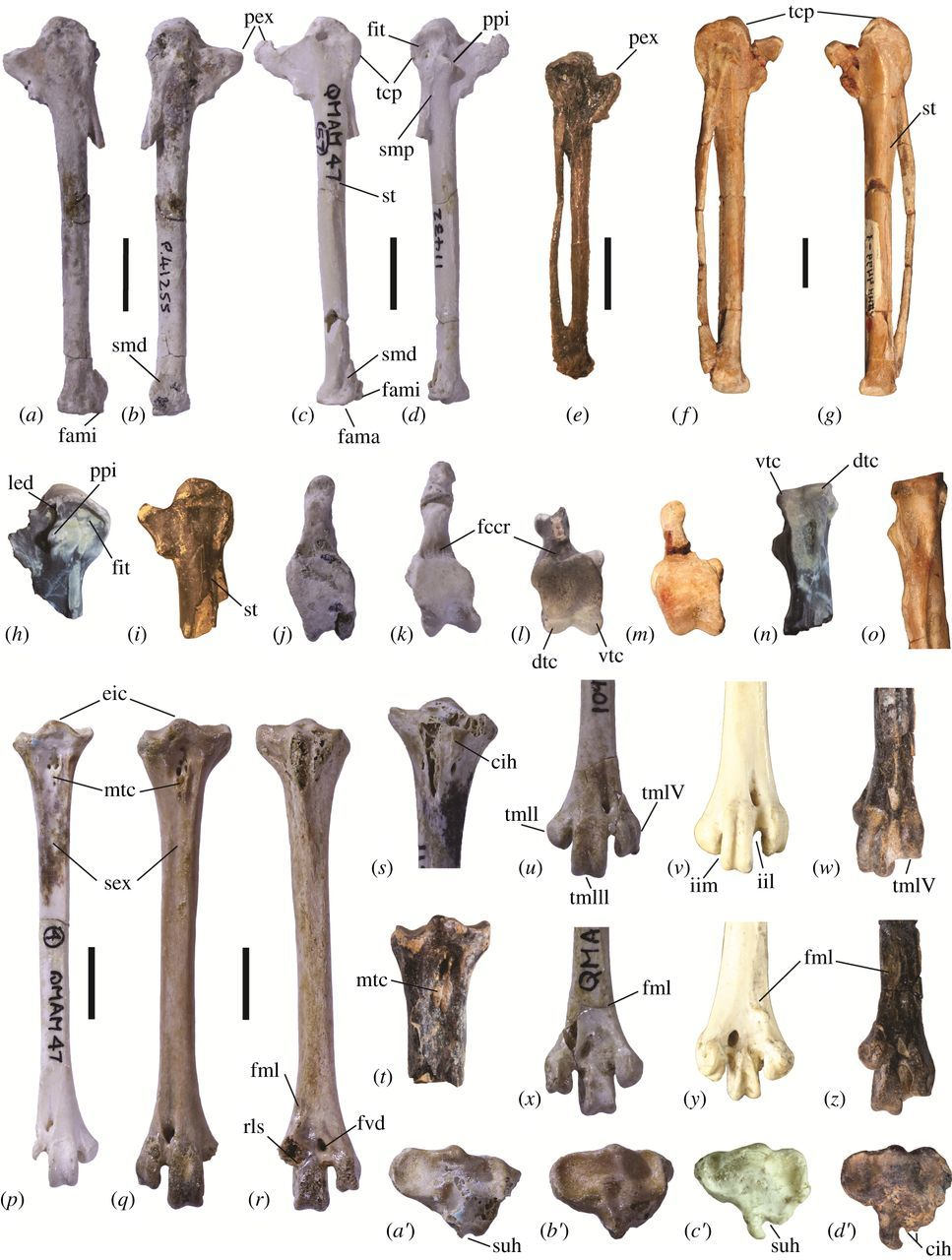
- Postcranial elements of Wilaru, Presbyornis pervetus, Teviornis and the southern screamer

Scientific classification
- Kingdom: Animalia
- Phylum: Chordata
- Class: Aves
- Family: †Presbyornithidae
- Genus: †Teviornis; Kurochkin, Dyke & Karhu, 2002
- Species: †T. gobiensis

Binomial name
- †Teviornis gobiensis Kurochkin, Dyke & Karhu, 2002

= Teviornis =

Teviornis Temporal range: Late Cretaceous, 70 Ma

Extinct genus of birds

Teviornis is an extinct genus of presbyornithid which lived during the Maastrichtian stage, around 70 million years ago. One species has been described, T. gobiensis. It is the oldest known neognath along with Vegavis, and its fossils are collected from the Nemegt Formation of Mongolia.

== Discovery and naming ==
The fossils were collected at the Guriliin Tsav locality, northwest corner of Umnogobi Aimak, Mongolia. The holotype consists of a crushed partial right forelimb. These pieces include a nearly complete right carpometacarpus, two phalanges, the radiale and ulnare of the wrist, and a fragment of the distal right humerus. The catalog number of these fossils are given multiple times as PIN 4499–1, but they are listed as PIN 44991–1 on page 3, where the holotype is formally listed. This is probably a misprint.

The genus name Teviornis is the Greek masculine word for bird combined with the name of Victor Tereschenko, the Paleontologist at the PIN who discovered the specimen. The species name T. gobiensis refers to the harsh Gobi Desert in which the fossil was found. The fossils are in the collection of the Paleontological Institute, Russian Academy of Sciences, Moscow.

== Classification ==
In 2002, Teviornis was described by Kurochkin, Dyke & Karhu as a member of the Presbyornithidae. These were stilt-legged, Anseriform, waterfowl which are extinct, but which flourished during the Late Cretaceous and Paleogene. If Teviornis does belong to the Presbyornithidae then, together with Vegavis from Antarctica, there is evidence that relatives of today's waterfowl already were widespread and highly apomorphic by the end of the Mesozoic.

Clarke and Norell reviewed the specimen in 2004. They concluded that some of the characters used by Kurochkin et al. to assign T. gobiensis to the Anseriformes, such as an unbowed metacarpal III, are plesiomorphies which are primitive for Avialae and also retained in some members of Ornithurae. They found that the remaining characters used by Kurochkin et al. also had wider distribution than was assumed, or had an incompletely studied distribution. Moreover, Clarke and Norell found no synapomorphies of Aves (sensu Gauthier), Neognathae, or Galloanseres, preserved in PIN 4499–1, so they concluded that Teviornis cannot be confidently assigned to the Presbyornithidae.

In 2016, De Pietri and colleagues reassessed the type specimen of Teviornis and confirmed the taxon's identity as a presbyornithid on the basis of the trochlea carpalis extension (a bony articular process that drives wing extension and flexion), elongate sulcus tendineus, metacarpal synostosis, etc. Certain morphological traits of the type specimen including the facies articularis dimension and the craniocaudally elongated fossa are also found in the other presbyornithids such as Wilaru and Telmabates. Its non-curved carpometacarpus also confirms its identity as an anseriform outside the crown-group. A 2019 study also supports the placement of presbyornithids as stem anseriforms. In 2020, a possible Eocene presbyornithid specimen from Algeria notably showed similarity to Teviornis based on the carpal trochlea extension and the shape of the fossa, supporting the taxonomic identity of Teviornis as a presbyornithid. Phylogenetic analysis showed different results: the 2023 study placed Teviornis as a presbyornithid, while the 2025 study placed Teviornis as a basal ornithurine.

== Paleoenvironment ==
The type and only known locality of Teviornis is the "Guriliin Tsav" (also known as "Gurilyn Tsav" or "Gurlin Tsav") of the Nemegt Formation. Other dinosaurs recovered from Gurillin Tsav include the tyrannosaurid Tarbosaurus, the ornithomimid Gallimimus, the oviraptorid Oksoko, the hadrosaurid Saurolophus, the pachycephalosaurid Prenocephale and the enantiornithine Gurilynia. Other animals from the same locality include the sichuanchelyid turtle Mongolochelys, the azhdarchid pterosaur and the metatherian mammal (Gurlin Tsav skull).
