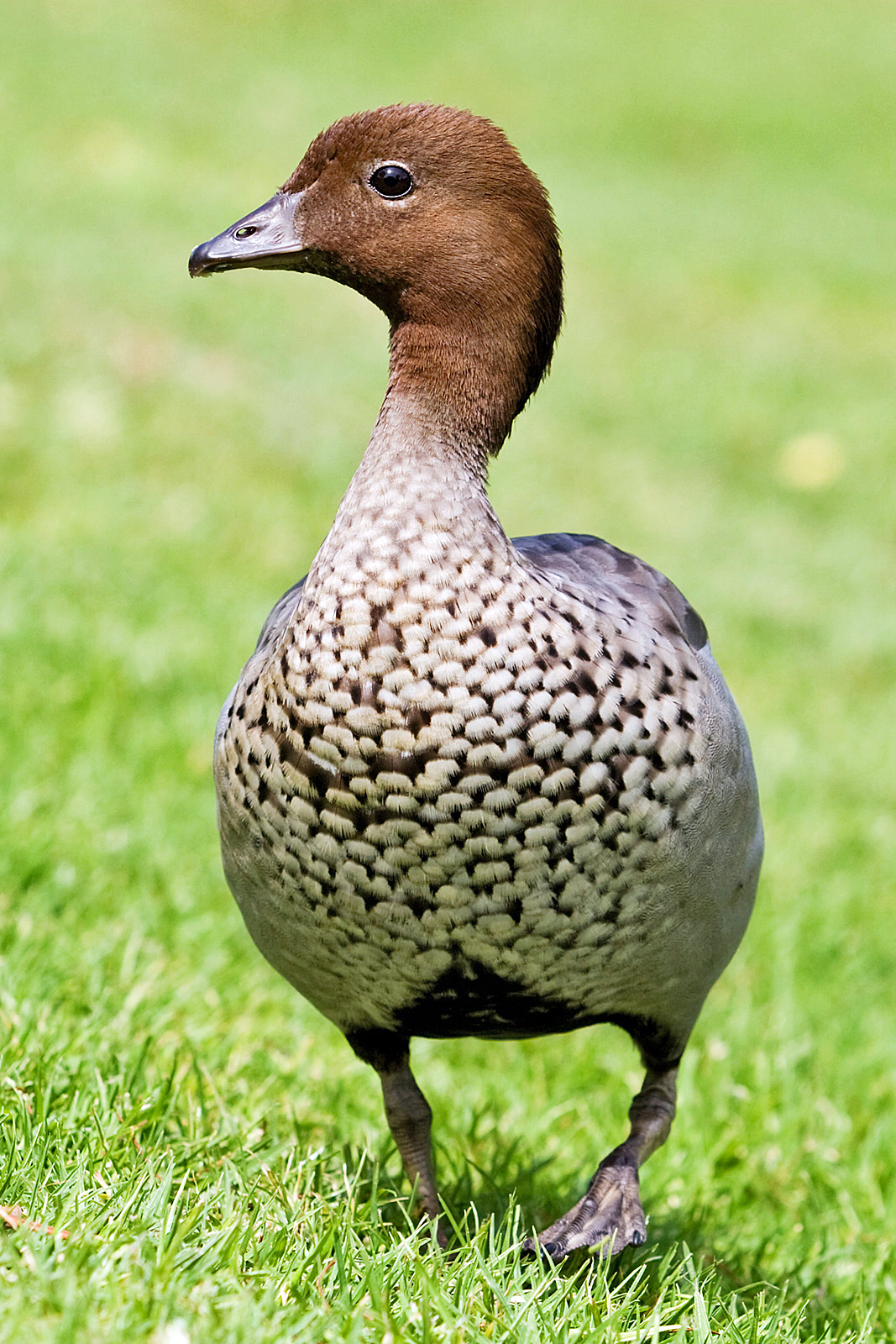
- Adult male
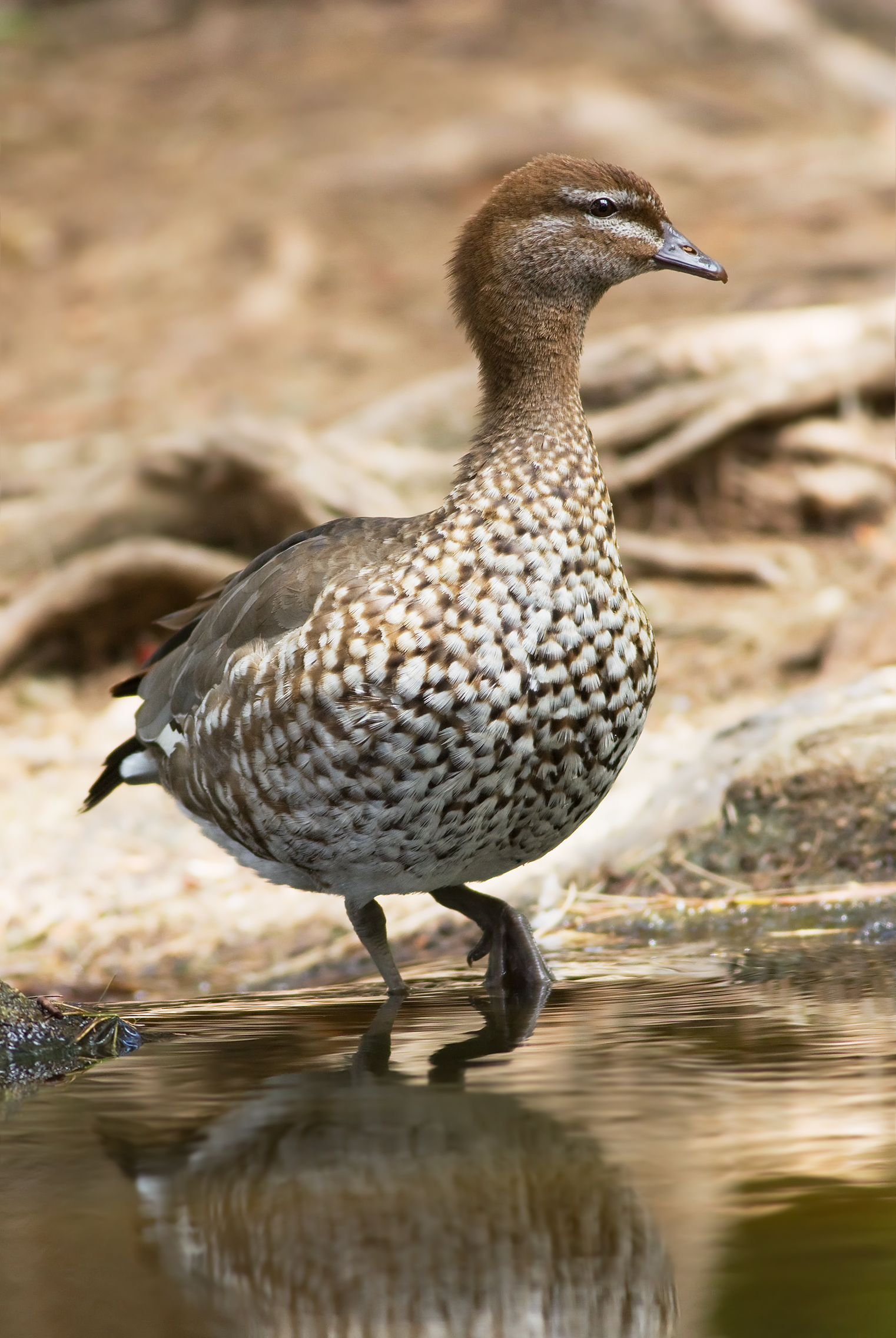
- Adult female

Conservation status
- Least Concern (IUCN 3.1)

Scientific classification
- Kingdom: Animalia
- Phylum: Chordata
- Class: Aves
- Order: Anseriformes
- Family: Anatidae
- Genus: Chenonetta
- Species: C. jubata

Binomial name
- Chenonetta jubata (Latham, 1801)
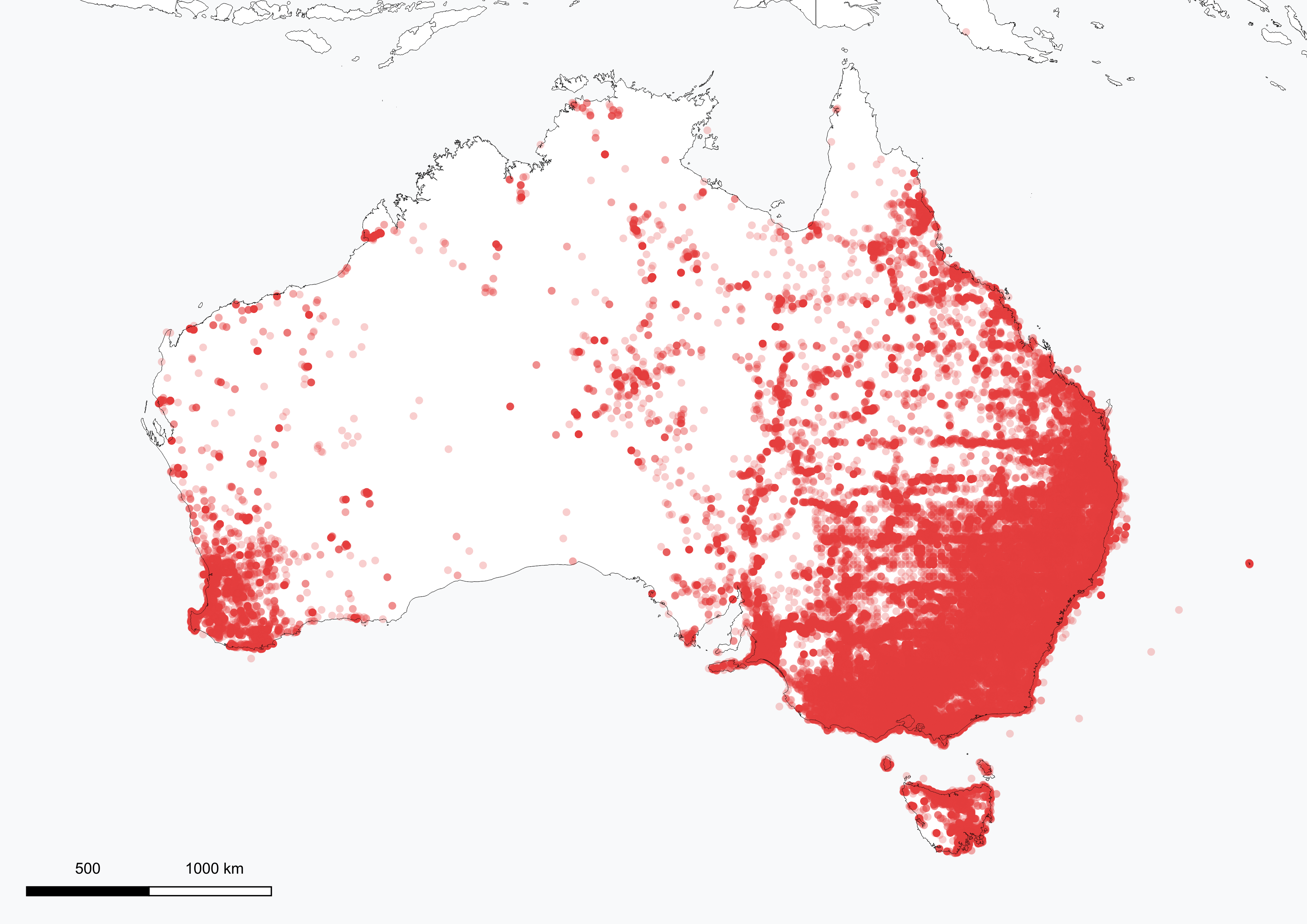
- Species range in Australia

= Australian wood duck =

Species of bird

The Australian wood duck, maned duck, or maned goose (Chenonetta jubata) is a dabbling duck found throughout much of Australia. It is the only living species in the genus Chenonetta.

== Taxonomy ==
The Australian wood duck was first described by English ornithologist John Latham in 1801 under the binomial name Anas jubata.

It had been associated with the ringed teal as possibly its closest living relative, but more detailed recent genetic evidence points to it belonging to an early clade of diving ducks, with its closest relatives being blue duck (Hymenolaimus malacorhynchos) in New Zealand and the pantropical comb ducks (Sarkidiornis), and with these next closest to a group including Hartlaub's duck (Pteronetta hartlaubii), blue-winged goose (Cyanochen cyanoptera), marbled duck (Marmaronetta angustirostris), white-winged duck (Asarcornis scutulata), and the widespread genera Netta and Aythya.

The extinct, flightless New Zealand species Chenonetta finschi (Finsch's duck) which was formerly believed to constitute a monotypic genus (Euryanas) has been determined to belong to Chenonetta. It became extinct before scientists could properly survey the New Zealand avifauna, but possibly as late as 1870, based on a report of a flightless goose caught in Ōpōtiki.

=== Etymology ===
Chenonetta: Greek: χην khēn, χηνος khēnos "goose"; νηττα nētta "duck".
jubata: Latin: iubatus "maned, crested", from iuba "mane, crest"

== Description ==
This 45–51 cm (18–20 in) duck looks like a small goose, and mostly feeds by grazing in flocks.

The male is grey with a dark brown head, mottled breast, and very thin, white-and-black stripes on sides/flanks. The female has white stripes above and below the eye and mottled underparts. Both sexes have grey wings with black primaries and a white speculum. Juveniles are similar to adult females, but lighter and with a more streaky breast.

== Distribution and habitat ==
The Australian wood duck is widespread in Australia, including Tasmania. It is found in grasslands, open woodlands, wetlands, flooded pastures, and along the coast in inlets and bays. It is also common on farmland with dams, as well as around rice fields and sewage ponds and in urban parks. It often is found around deeper lakes that may be unsuitable for other waterbirds' foraging, as it prefers to forage on land. It has been recorded as a vagrant in New Zealand, although in 2015 and 2016, a pair successfully bred there. The species has been introduced to western Europe, particularly the United Kingdom, Belgium, Germany, and the Netherlands.

== Behaviour ==
=== Call ===
Their most common call is a loud, rising croaky gnow sound by the females, and male calls are the same except smoother, shorter, and higher in pitch than the females. Staccato chattering is also present in flocks.

=== Protection ===
Australian wood ducks are widespread in their geographic and environmental ranges. This species has benefited from agriculture and urban development due to the abundance of fresh water sources. In comparison to other species of Australian ducks, the Australian wood duck is very common in urban areas, especially near permanent water sources such as dams, ponds, pools, and irrigated grass areas such as sporting facilities, urban parks, and residential nature strips.

The Australian wood duck is classified as a game bird in states and territories where recreational hunting is permitted, and with the exception of the Australian Capital Territory, it can be harvested throughout its geographic range by licensed hunters in all states and territories either as a pest animal or during declared recreational hunting seasons.

In Western Australia, the Australian wood duck is a declared pest of agriculture in the South West Land Division under the provisions of Section 35 the Agriculture and Related Resources Protection Act 1976 and can be legally harvested on private land between the 1 January and 30 June, in accordance with a restricted open season notice, without the need to obtain a damage licence from the WA Department of Environment and Conservation.

In New South Wales, the Australian wood duck, along with nine other species of Australian ducks, can be harvested under the NSW Native Game Bird Management Program on private property by land owners and recreational hunters who have passed the nationally recognised Waterfowl Identification Test and hold the appropriate New South Wales Game license.

In Queensland, these ducks, along with other species of waterfowl, can be harvested under the appropriate Damage Mitigation Permit for culling and dispersal of wildlife identified as posing a risk of damage to property or agricultural production.

In addition to recreational and mitigation harvesting, the Australian wood duck (ngawurk in the Dja Dja Wurrung language and other species of waterfowl can be harvested by traditional owners using traditional and modern methods in all states and territories.

This species is not threatened and due to its environmental adaptability, its numbers are considered to be increasing.

=== Reproduction ===
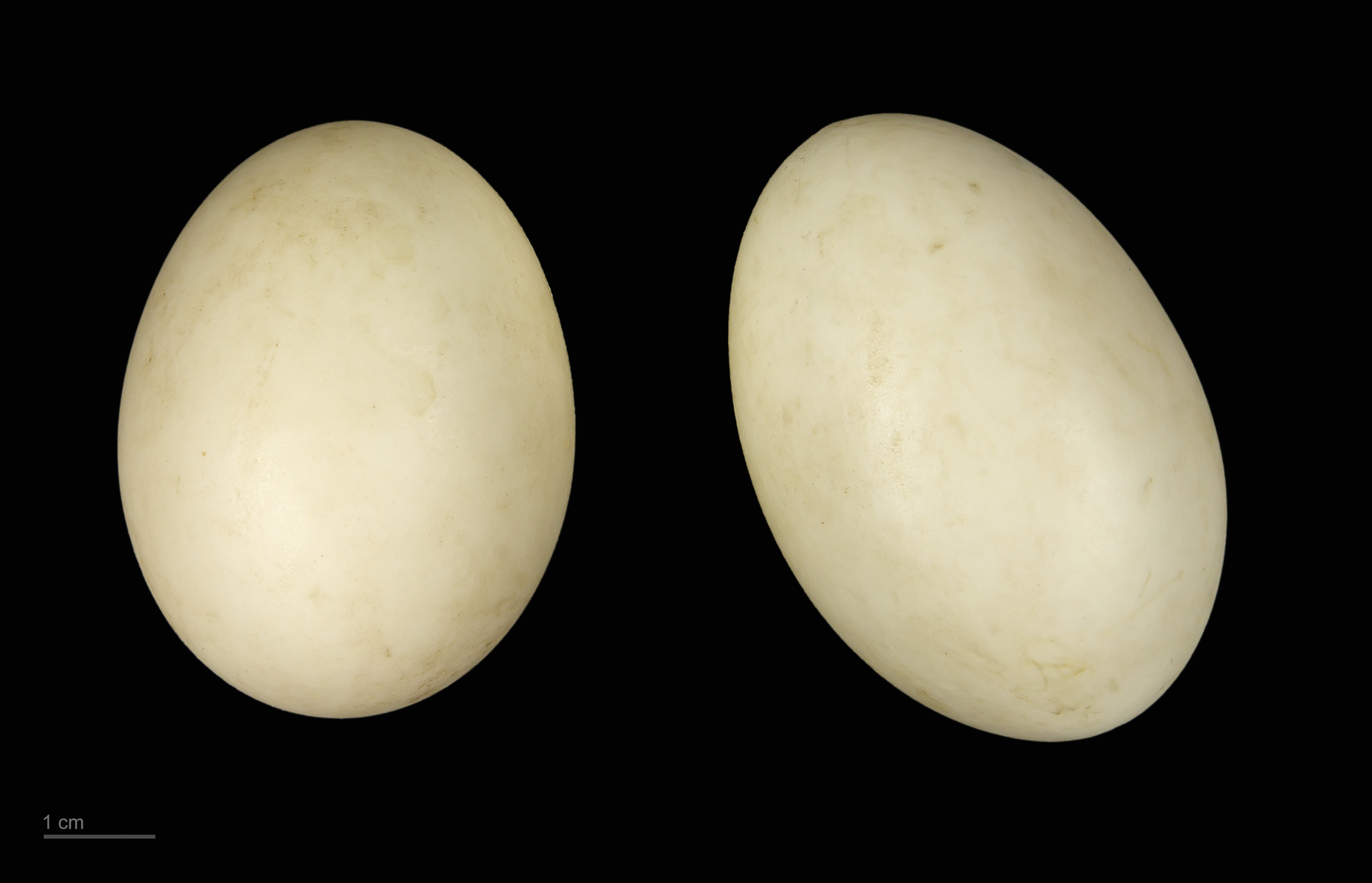
Chenonetta jubata - MHNT

Australian wood ducks nest in cavities in trees or in nest boxes above or near water. They are lined with a pile of down.

This duck lays 9–11 cream-white eggs, similar to the Mandarin ducks. The female incubates them while the male stands guard. Once the ducklings are ready to leave the nest, the female flies to the ground and the duckling leap to the ground and follow their parents. The males also secure their ducklings closely along with the females.

== Feeding ==
The Australian wood duck eats grasses, grains, clover and other herbs, and occasionally, insects. It is rarely seen on open water, preferring to forage by dabbling in shallow water, or in grasslands and crops.

== Similar species ==
The Australian wood duck can be distinguished from pygmy geese, Nettapus spp., which are smaller, have bold, white face markings and are usually seen on water. Whistling ducks, Dendrocygna spp., have longer legs and necks and larger, more duck-like bills and tend to walk more upright. When flying, the Australian wood duck is the only duck with white secondary feathers and dark wingtips.

== Gallery ==
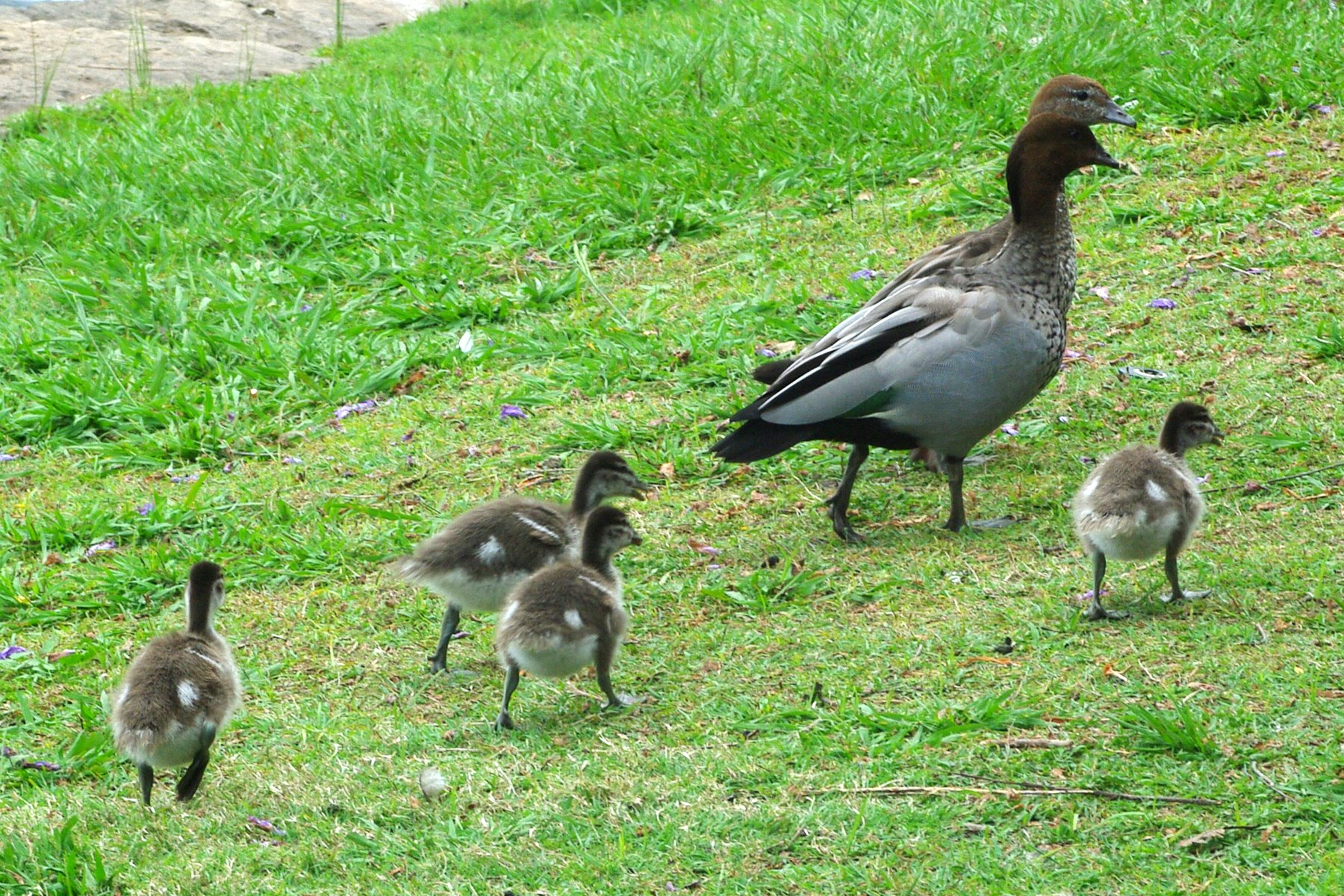
Family in Australia

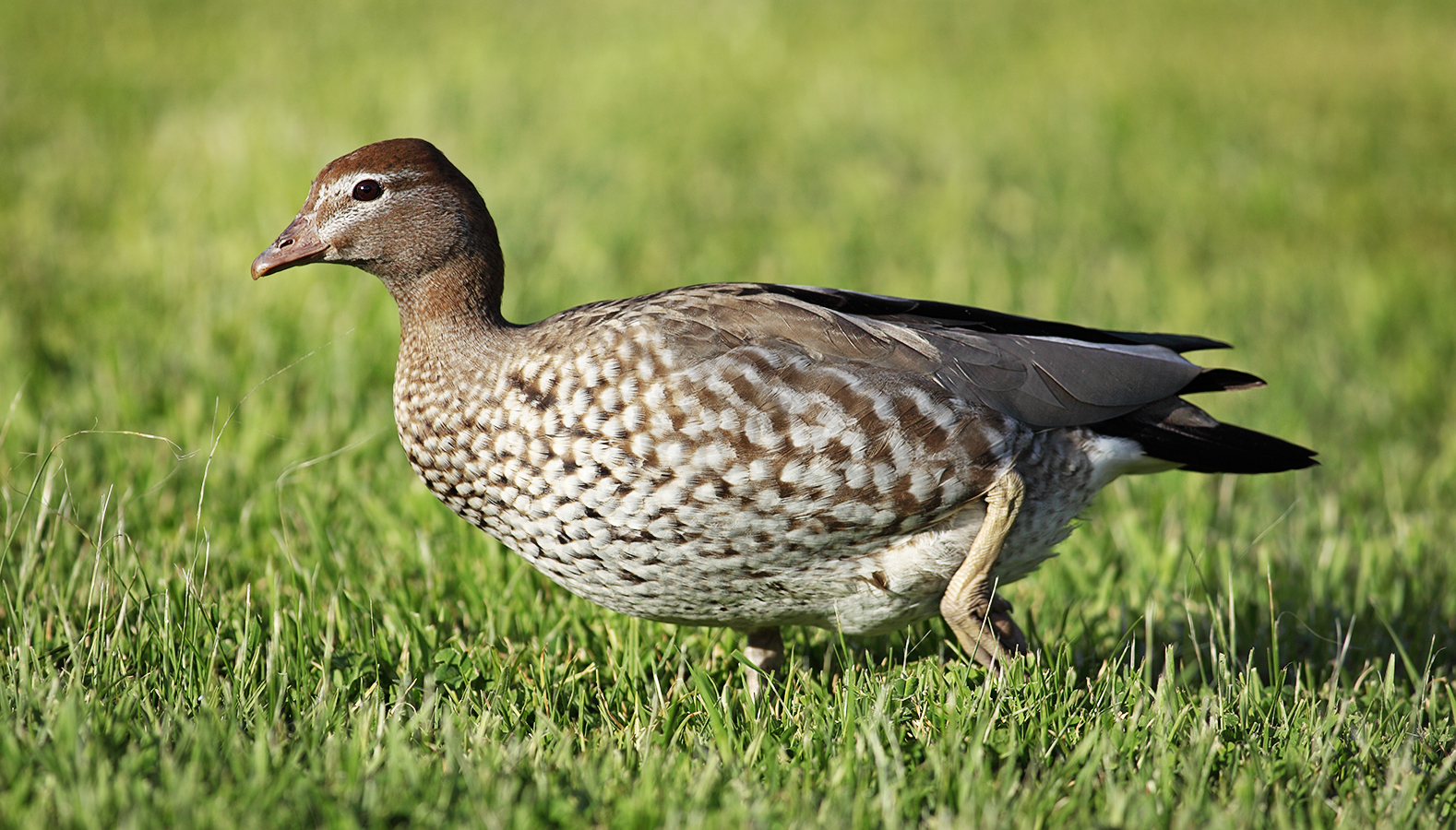
Profile view of female

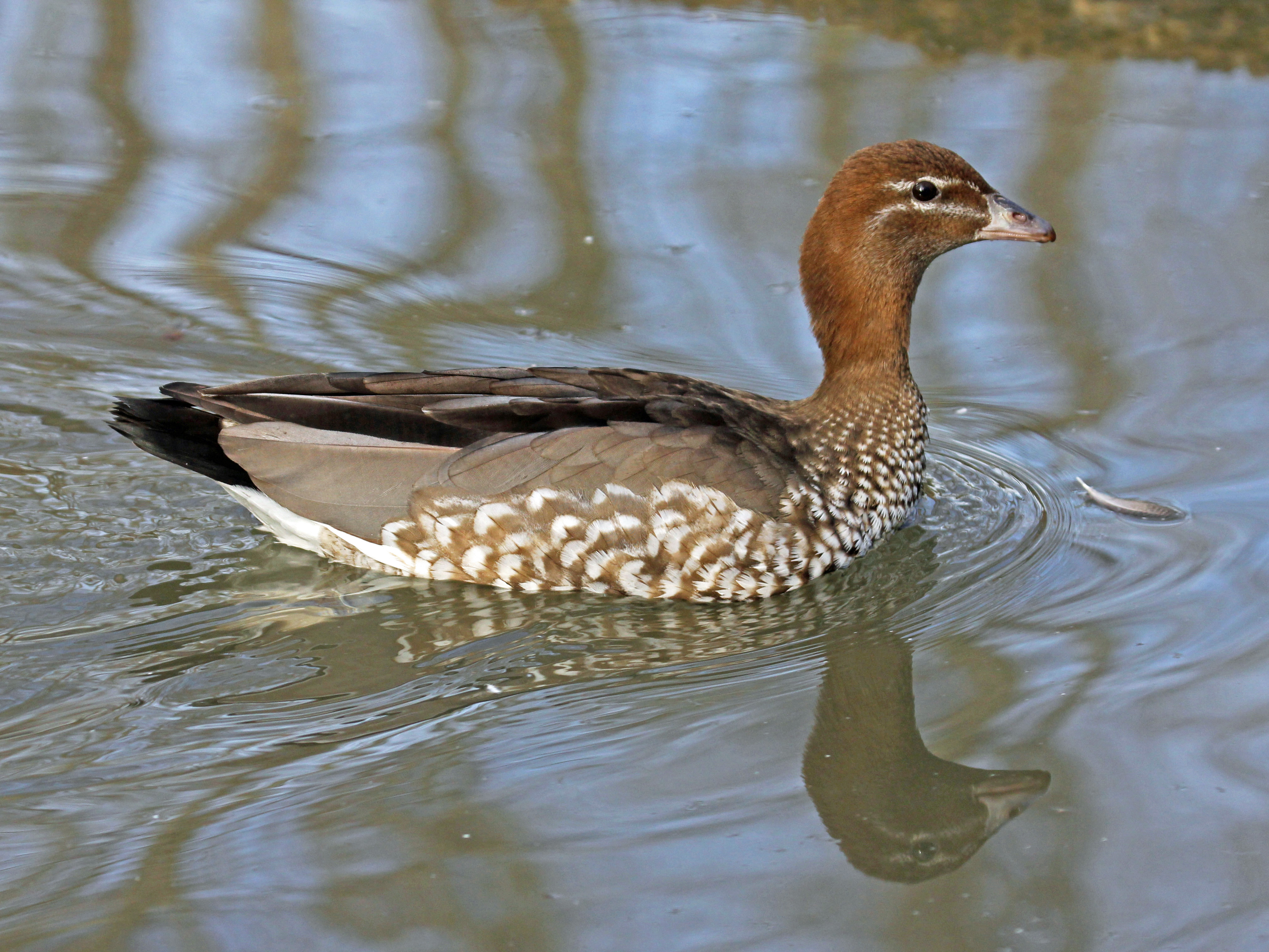
Female swimming

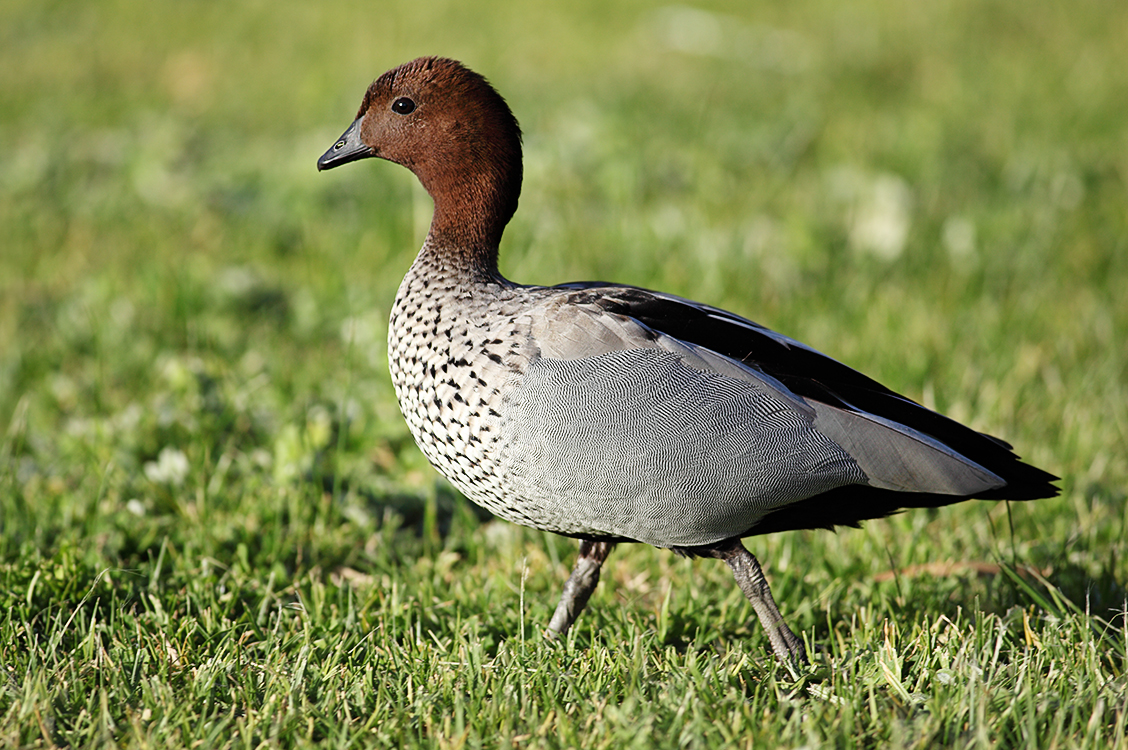
Profile view of male

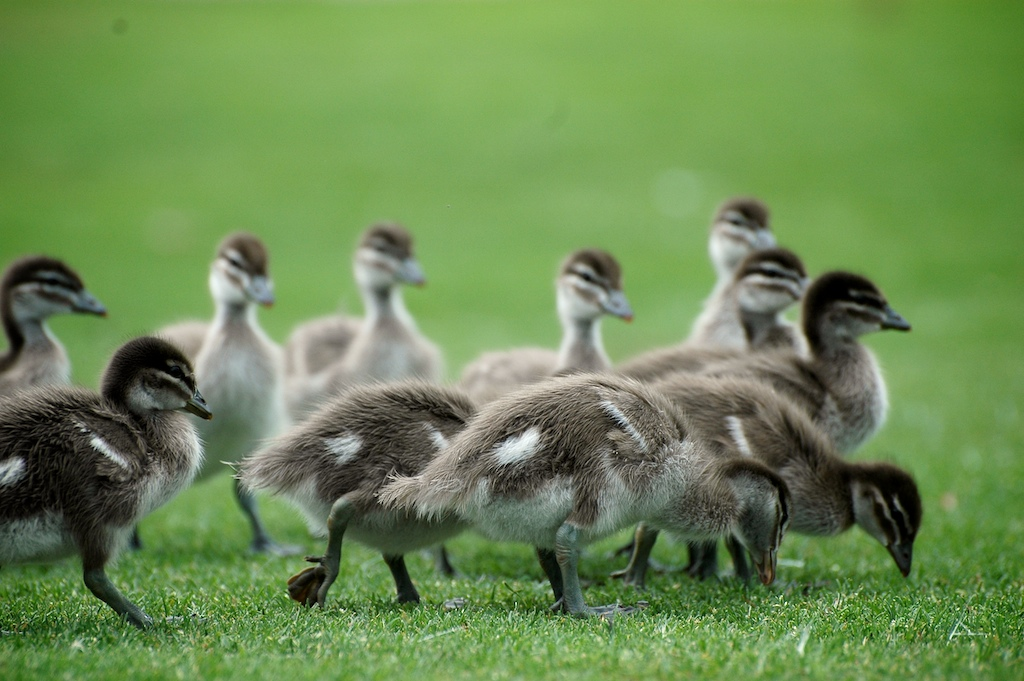
Ducklings in Kings Park, Western Australia

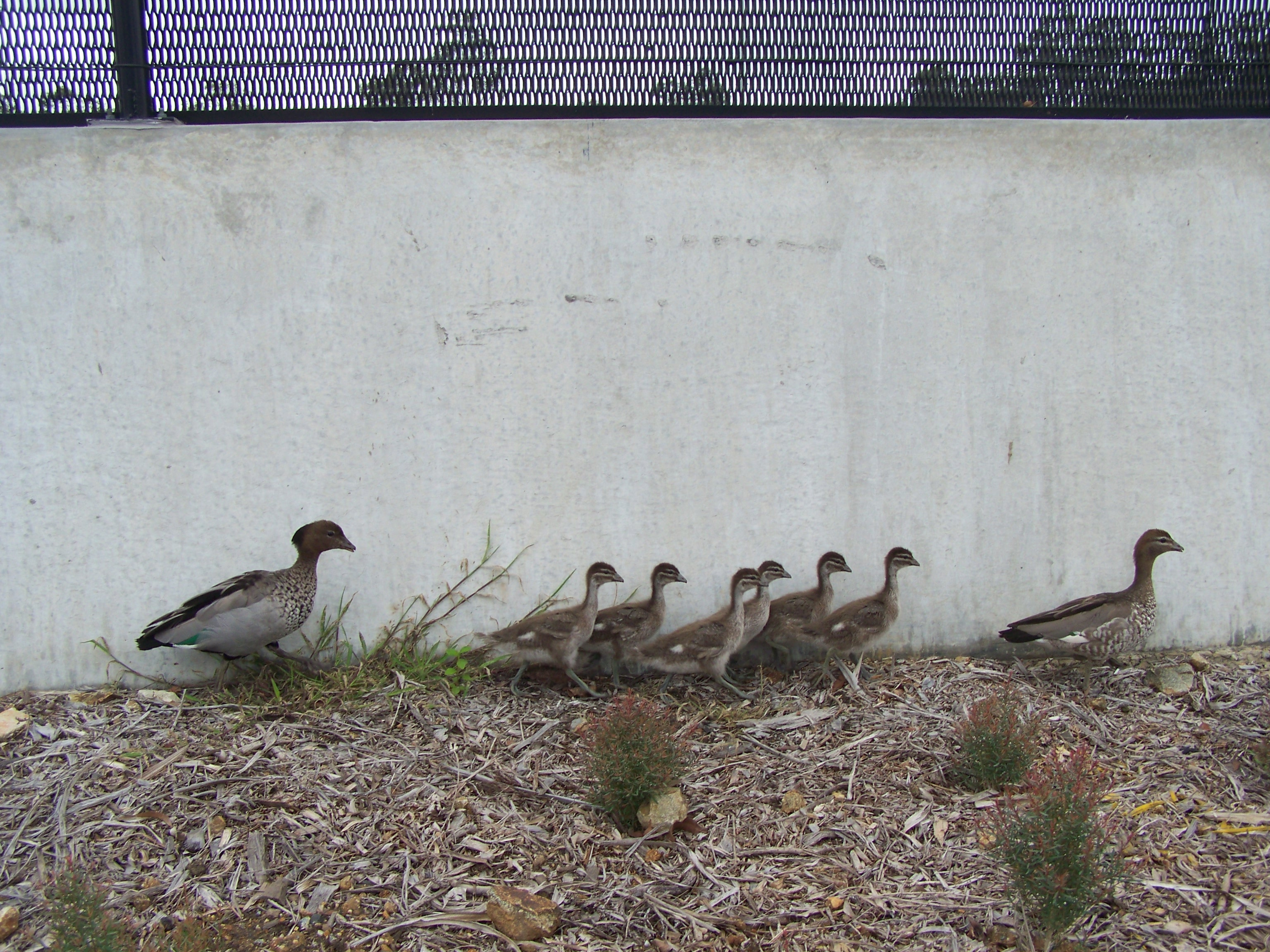
Family in Queensland

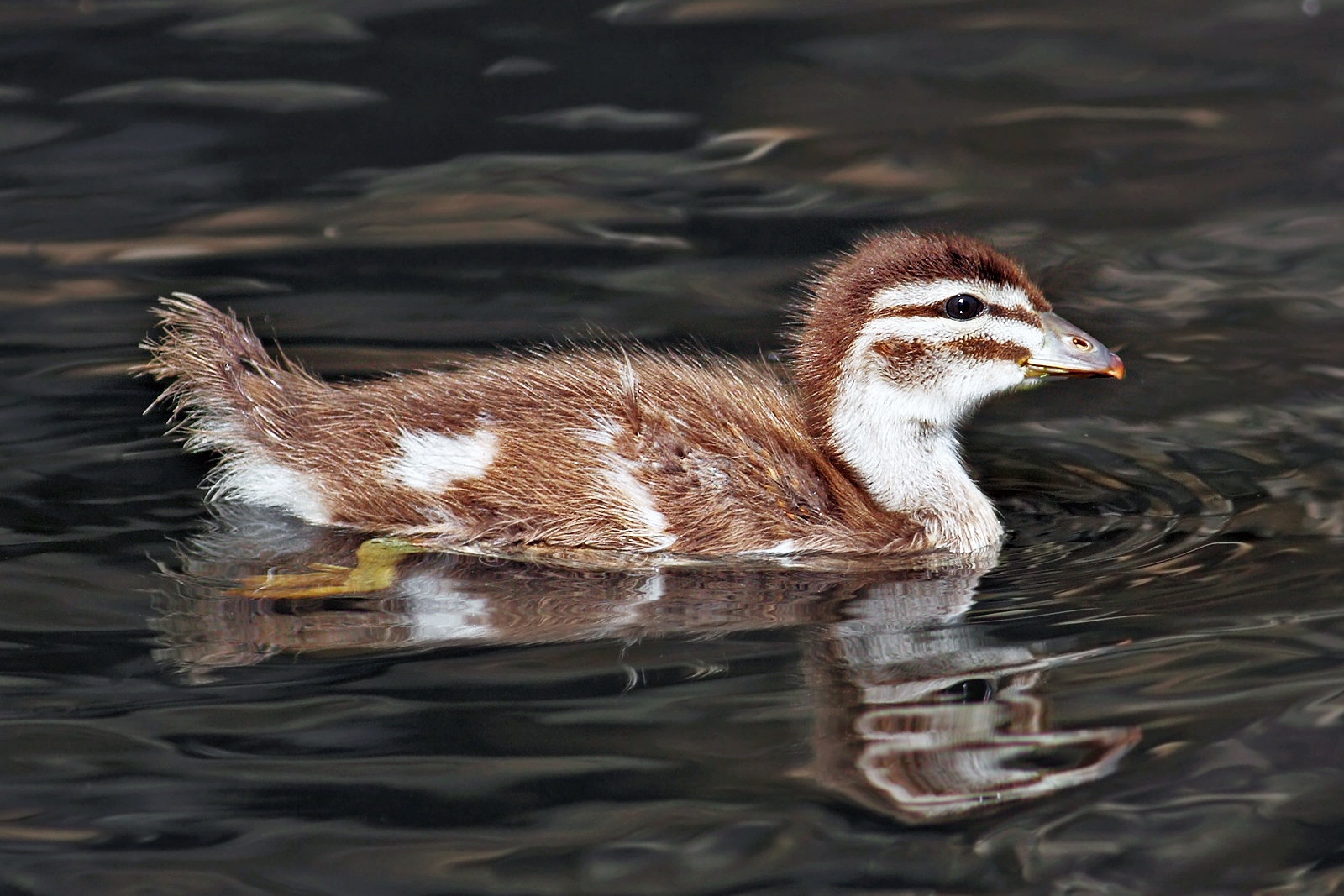
Duckling

Males grazing at Belair National Park, South Australia
