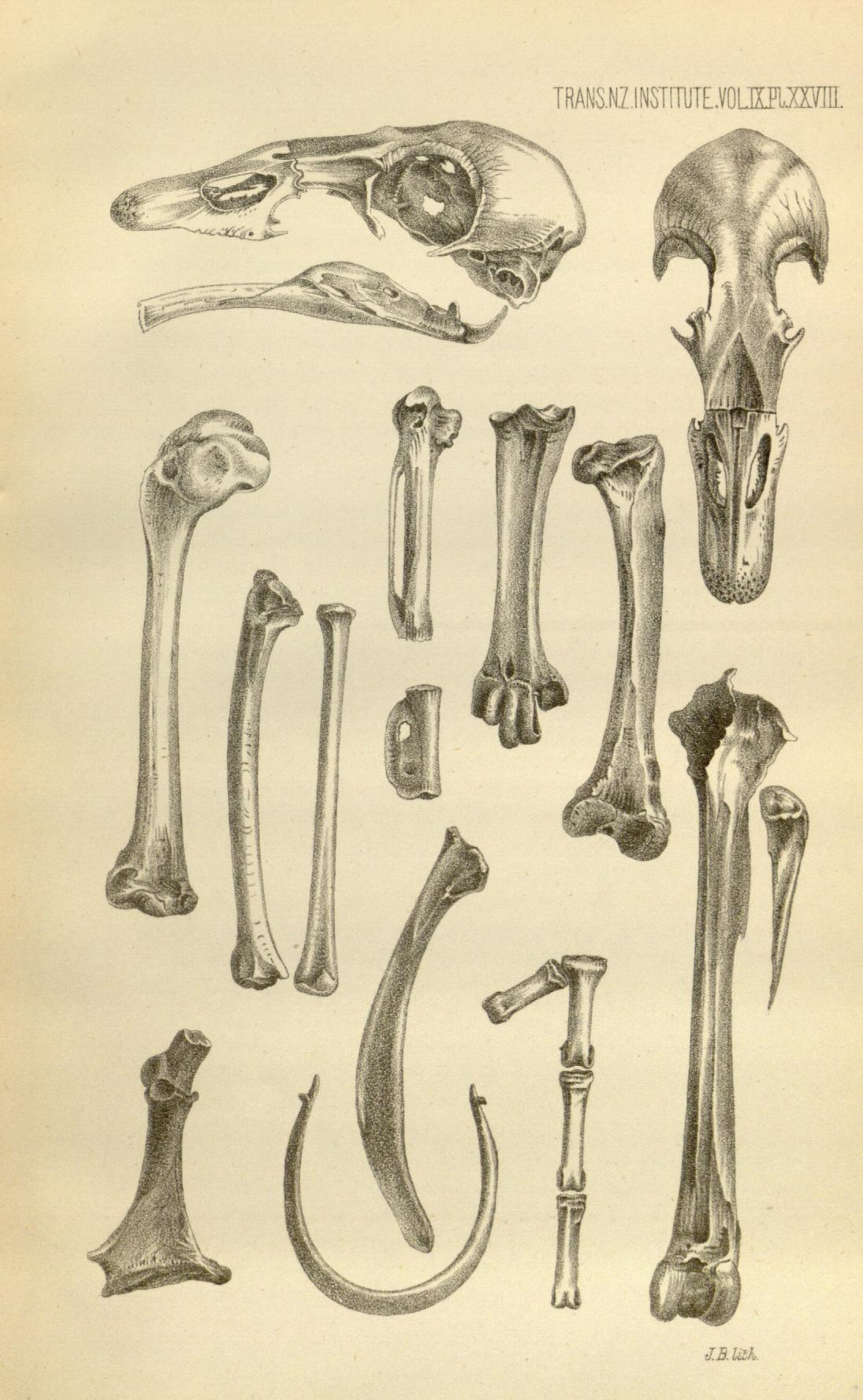
- Holotype bones

Conservation status
- Extinct (1600s) (IUCN 3.1)

- Extinct (1600s) (NZ TCS)

Scientific classification
- Kingdom: Animalia
- Phylum: Chordata
- Class: Aves
- Order: Anseriformes
- Family: Anatidae
- Genus: Chenonetta
- Species: †C. finschi

Binomial name
- †Chenonetta finschi (van Beneden, 1875)

Synonyms
- Euryanas finschi Oliver, 1930

= Finsch's duck =

Extinct species of bird

Finsch's duck (Chenonetta finschi) (Māori: Manutahora) is an extinct species of large terrestrial duck that was endemic to New Zealand. The species was possibly once the most common duck in New Zealand, a supposition based on the frequency of its fossils in bone deposits.

== Taxonomy ==
Finsch's duck was scientifically described as Anas finschi in 1876 by Pierre-Joseph van Beneden. The specific epithet finschi and the common name honours ornithologist Otto Finsch, who first recognised it as a distinct species.

The species was originally considered to be in its own genus, Euryanas, but is now known to be closely related to the maned duck and recently derived from that species.

== Description ==
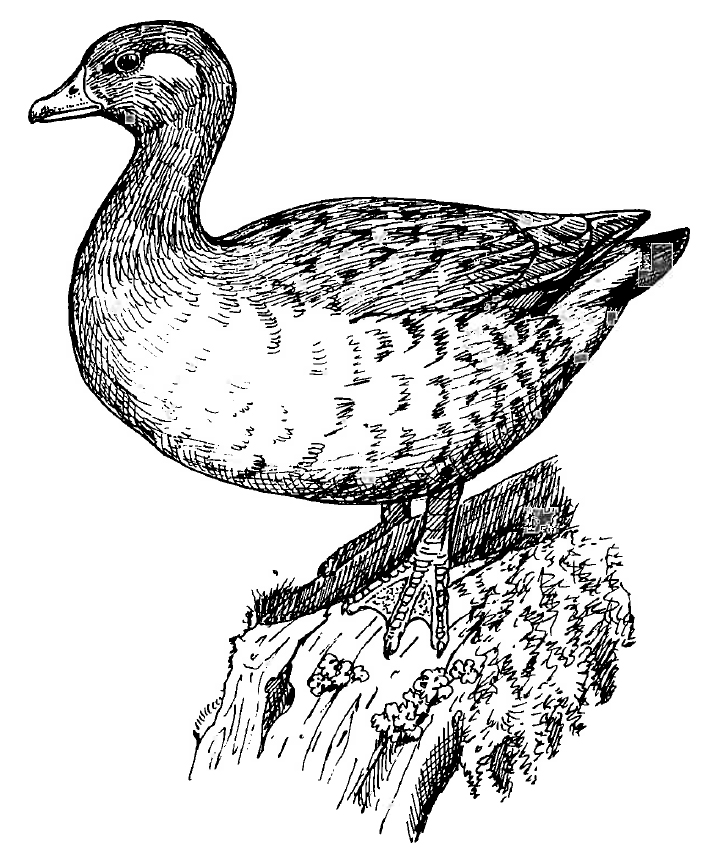
Life restoration

The Finsch's duck was much larger than the maned duck, probably weighing twice as much (around 1–2 kg (2.2–4.4 lb)) and having larger legs. The wings were much reduced however, and it seems that flight was lost relatively quickly after the species arrived in New Zealand.

== Behaviour and ecology ==
Little is known about the biology of the species, but its remains have been found widely in New Zealand and it does not seem to have been tied to water like many other duck species.

This species was present in forests, shrublands and temperate grasslands.

It is likely that Finsch's duck bred in hollows, tree trunk or fallen logs because these are the preferred breeding locations of the Australian wood duck, its nearest relative.

Finsch's duck was most likely a grazer and browser of vegetation, probably mixed with fallen fruit and some invertebrates.

== Extinction ==
The species is thought to have become extinct due to human hunting and predation by introduced species, particularly rats. Like many large flightless New Zealand birds its remains have been found in Māori middens. Radiocarbon dating puts the youngest bones of the species as recently as the 15th −17th centuries, and one account of a large flightless goose killed in Ōpōtiki suggests the species might have survived until 1870.
