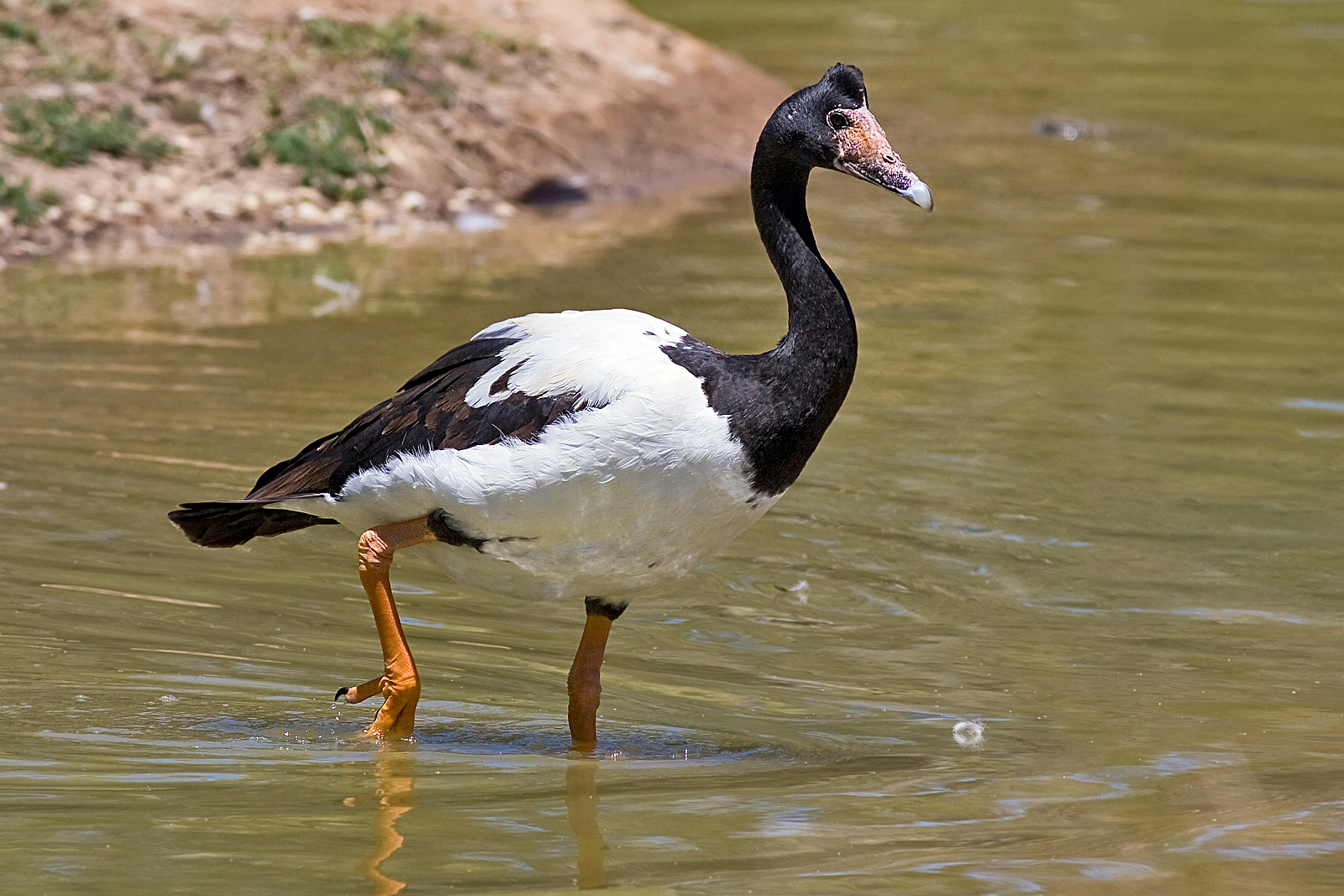
- Magpie goose, Anseranas semipalmata

Scientific classification
- Kingdom: Animalia
- Phylum: Chordata
- Class: Aves
- Superorder: Galloanserae
- Clade: Odontoanserae
- Clade: Anserimorphae
- Order: Anseriformes; Wagler, 1831

Subtaxa
- †Anachronornis; †Anatalavis; †Conflicto?; †Eonessa; †Naranbulagornis; †Paakniwatavis; †Palaeopapia; †Peioa; †Petropluvialis?; †Proherodius?; †Vegavis?; †Wunketru; Anhimae Wetmore & Miller, 1926; Anhimidae; †Dromornithidae?; Anseres Wetmore & Miller, 1926; Anseranatoidea Sclater, 1880; Anatoidea Leach, 1820; Anatidae; †Paranyroca; †Presbyornithidae?
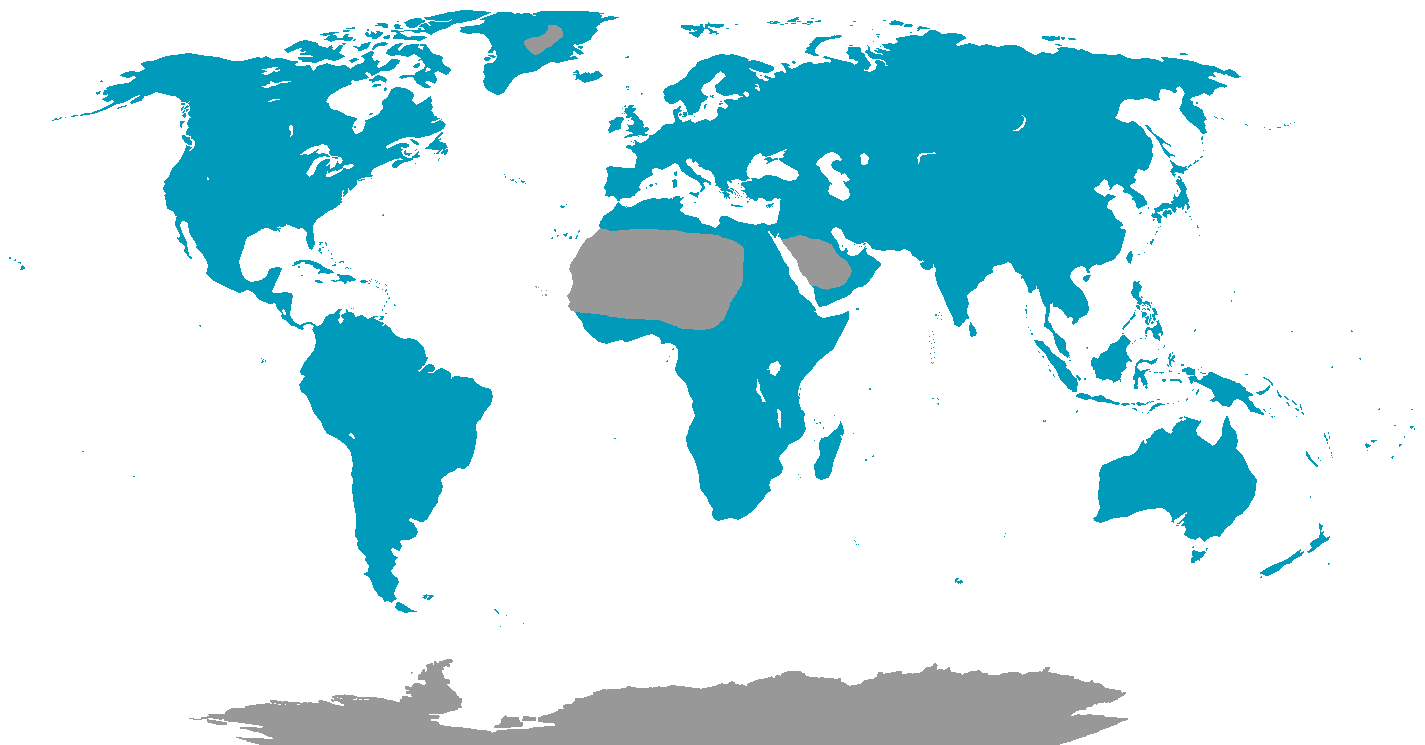
- Range of the waterfowl and allies

= Anseriformes =

Anseriformes Temporal range: Maastrichtian–Present

Order of water birds

Anseriformes is an order of birds also known as waterfowl that comprises 178 living species of birds in three families: Anhimidae (three species of screamers), Anseranatidae (the magpie goose), and Anatidae, the largest family, which includes the other 174 species of waterfowl, among them the ducks, geese, and swans. Most modern species in the order are highly adapted for an aquatic existence at the water surface. With the exception of screamers, males have penises, a trait that has been lost in the Neoaves, the clade consisting of all other modern birds except the galliformes and paleognaths. Due to their aquatic nature, most species are web-footed.

== Evolution ==
Anseriformes are one of only two types of modern bird to be confirmed present during the Mesozoic alongside the other dinosaurs, and in fact were among the very few birds to survive their extinction, along with their cousins, the Galliformes. These two groups only occupied two ecological niches during the Mesozoic, living in water and on the ground, while the toothed Enantiornithes were the dominant birds that ruled the trees and air. The asteroid that ended the Mesozoic caused mass global deforestation, a condition that took centuries to recover from, with some models estimating that greenhouse effects lasted for thousands of years. The Anseriformes and Galliformes are thought to have survived in the cover of burrows and water, and not to have needed trees for food and reproduction.

The earliest known stem anseriform is the presbyornithid Teviornis from the Nemegt Formation of Mongolia. Some members apparently surviving the KT extinction event, including presbyornithids, thought to be the common ancestors of ducks, geese, swans, and screamers, the last group once thought to be Galliformes, but now genetically confirmed to be closely related to geese. The first known duck fossils start to appear about 34 million years ago.

Waterfowl are the best-known examples of sexually antagonistic genital coevolution in vertebrates, causing genital adaptations to coevolve in each sex to advance control over mating and fertilization. Sexually antagonistic coevolution (or SAC) occurs as a consequence of sexual conflict between males and females, resulting in coevolutionary process that reduce fit, or that functions to decrease ease of having sex.

== Taxonomy ==
The Anseriformes and the Galliformes (pheasants, etc.) belong to a common group, the Galloanserae. They are the most primitive neognathous birds, and as such they should follow the Palaeognathae (ratites and tinamous) in bird classification systems. Several unusual extinct families of birds like the albatross-like pseudotooth birds and the giant flightless gastornithids and mihirungs have been found to be stem-anseriforms based on common features found in the skull region, beak physiology and pelvic region. The genus Vegavis for a while was found to be the earliest member of the anseriform crown group but a recent 2017 paper has found it to be just outside the crown group in the family Vegaviidae. However, the monophyly of Vegaviidae was questioned by Torres et al. (2025) who described a nearly complete skull of Vegavis in 2025, supporting its placement within crown group Anseriformes. However, Irazoqui et al. (2026) who redescribed this skull suggested that Vegavis can only be confidently placed as a neognath of uncertain affinities.

Below is the general consensus (prior to Torres et al. (2025)) of the phylogeny of anseriforms and their stem relatives.

- Odontoanserae
  - †Pelagornithidae (pseudo-tooth birds)
  - Anserimorphae
    - †Gastornithidae
    - - †Dromornithidae (mihirungs)
      - - †Vegaviidae
        - Anseriformes (screamers and waterfowl)

=== Systematics ===
Anatidae is traditionally divided into subfamilies Anatinae and Anserinae. The systematics, especially regarding placement of some "odd" genera in the dabbling ducks or shelducks, is better resolved following the genetic analysis by Buckner et al. (2018); this has led to the reassignment of many genera to different tribes to which they were traditionally assigned. The list below follows the AviList, which has accepted these revisions: Note that AviList only includes extant and recently extinct genera:

- Order Anseriformes
  - Suborder Anhimae Wetmore & Miller 1926
    - Family Anhimidae Stejneger 1885 (screamers)
      - Genus Anhima (Linnaeus 1766) Brisson 1760 (horned screamer)
      - Genus Chauna Illiger 1811
  - Suborder Anseres (true Anseriformes)
    - Family Anseranatidae Sclater 1880
      - Genus Anseranas (Latham 1798) Lesson 1828 (magpie goose)
    - Family Anatidae Leach 1820 (almost 150 species)
      - Subfamily Dendrocygninae Reichenbach 1849–50
        - Genus Thalassornis Eyton 1838 (white-backed duck)
        - Genus Dendrocygna Swainson 1837 (whistling ducks)
      - Subfamily Stictonettinae
        - Genus Biziura Stephens 1824 (musk ducks)
        - Genus Nettapus von Brandt 1836 (pygmy geese)
        - Genus Stictonetta (Gould 1841) Reichenbach 1853 (freckled duck)
      - Subfamily Oxyurinae Swainson 1831 (stiff-tailed ducks and allies)
        - Genus Heteronetta (Merrem 1841) Salvadori 1865 (black-headed duck)
        - Genus Nomonyx (Linnaeus 1766) Ridgway 1880 (masked duck)
        - Genus Oxyura Bonaparte 1828
      - Subfamily Anserinae Vigors 1825 sensu Livezey 1996 (swans and geese)
        - Genus Plectropterus (Linnaeus 1766) (spur-winged goose)
        - Genus Malacorhynchus Swainson 1831 (pink-eared duck)
        - Genus Coscoroba (Molina 1782) Reichenbach 1853 (Coscoroba swan)
        - Genus Cereopsis Latham 1801 (Cape Barren goose)
        - Genus Cygnus Garsault 1764
        - Genus Branta Scopoli 1769
        - Genus Anser Brisson 1760
      - Subfamily Anatinae Vigors 1825 sensu Livezey 1996
        - Tribe Tadornini Reichenbach 1849–50 (shelducks and sheldgeese)
          - Genus Merganetta Gould 1842 (Torrent duck)
          - Genus Callonetta Delacour 1936 (ringed teal)
          - Genus Cairina (Linnaeus 1758) Fleming 1822 (Muscovy duck)
          - Genus Aix Boie 1828
          - Genus Neochen Oberholser 1918
          - Genus Chloephaga Eyton 1838
          - Genus Radjah Reichenbach, 1853
          - Genus Alopochen Stejneger 1885
          - Genus Tadorna Boie 1822
        - Tribe Mergini Rafinesque 1815 (eiders, scoters, mergansers and other sea-ducks)
          - Genus Clangula Leach 1819 (long-tailed duck)
          - Genus Polysticta stelleri (Pallas 1769) Eyton 1836 (Steller's eider)
          - Genus †Camptorhynchus (Gmelin 1789) Bonaparte 1838 (Labrador duck)
          - Genus Somateria Leach 1819 (eiders)
          - Genus Histrionicus Lesson 1828 (harlequin duck)
          - Genus Melanitta Boie 1822 (scoters)
          - Genus Bucephala Baird 1858
          - Genus Mergellus Selby 1840 (Smew)
          - Genus Lophodytes (Linnaeus 1758) Reichenbach 1853 (hooded merganser)
          - Genus Mergus Linnaeus 1758 non Brisson 1760
        - Tribe Aythyini Delacour and Mayr, 1945 (diving ducks)
          - Genus Sarkidiornis Eyton 1838
          - Genus Hymenolaimus (Gmelin 1789) Gray 1843 (blue duck)
          - Genus Chenonetta von Brandt 1836 (Australian wood duck)
          - Genus Cyanochen (Rüppell 1845) Bonaparte 1856 (blue-winged goose)
          - Genus Pteronetta (Cassin 1860) Salvadori 1895 (Hartlaub's duck)
          - Genus Marmaronetta (Ménétries 1832) Reichenbach 1853 (marbled duck)
          - Genus Asarcornis (Müller 1842) Salvadori 1895 (white-winged duck)
          - Genus ?†Rhodonessa Reichenbach 1853 (pink-headed duck)
          - Genus Netta Kaup 1829
          - Genus Aythya Boie 1822
        - Tribe Anatini Vigors 1825 sensu Livezey 1996 (dabbling ducks and moa-nalos)
          - Genus Salvadorina Rothschild & Hartert 1894 (Salvadori's teal)
          - Genus Lophonetta (King 1828) Riley 1914 (crested duck)
          - Genus Speculanas (King 1828) von Boetticher 1929 (bronze-winged duck)
          - Genus Amazonetta (Gmelin 1789) von Boetticher 1929 (Brazilian teal)
          - Genus Tachyeres Owen 1875 (steamer ducks)
          - Genus Sibirionetta (Georgi 1775) (Baikal teal)
          - Genus Spatula Boie 1822
          - Genus Mareca (Stephens 1824)
          - Genus Anas Linnaeus 1758

==== Extinct Anseriformes (fossil & subfossil) ====
Early basal Anseriformes:

  - ?†Conflicto Claudia P. Tambussi et al. 2019 – tentatively placed here; possibly family Conflictonidae
  - †Anatalavis Olson & Parris 1987 (Late Cretaceous/Early Paleocene – Early Eocene) – including Nettapterornis; may belong in Anseranatidae or Conflictonidae
  - †Naranbulagornis Zelenkov 2019
  - †Anachronornis
  - †Paakniwatavis Musser & Clarke 2024

Assigned to named families and subfamilies:

- Family Anhimidae Stejneger 1885
  - Genus †Chaunoides Alvarenga 1999
- Family Anseranatidae Sclater 1880
  - Genus †Anserpica Mourer-Chauviré, Berthet & Hugueney 2004
  - Genus †Eoanseranas Worthy & Scanlon 2009 (hand's dawn magpie goose)
- Family †Presbyornithidae? Wetmore 1926 (wading-"geese")
  - Genus †Teviornis Kuročkin, Dyke & Karhu 2002
  - Genus †Telmabates Howard 1955
  - Genus †Presbyornis Wetmore 1926
  - Genus †Wilaru Boles et al. 2013
  - Genus †Bumbalavis Zelenkov 2021
  - Genus †Murgonornis Worthy et al. 2023
- Family †Paranyrocidae Miller & Compton 1939
  - Genus †Paranyroca Miller & Compton 1939 (Rosebud Early Miocene of Bennett County, USA)
- Family Anatidae
  - Genus †Garganornis ballmanni Meijer 2014
- Subfamily †Romainvilliinae Lambrecht 1933
  - Genus †Romainvillia Lebedinský 1927 (Late Eocene/Early Oligocene)
  - Genus †Saintandrea Mayr & De Pietri 2013
- Subfamily †Dendrocheninae Livezey & Martin 1988
  - Genus †Dendrochen Miller 1944
  - Genus †Manuherikia Worthy et al. 2007
  - Genus †Mionetta Livezey & Martin 1988
- Subfamily Oxyurinae Swainson 1831 (stiff-tailed ducks and allies)
  - Genus †Anabernicula Ross 1935
- Subfamily Anserinae Vigors 1825 sensu Livezey 1996 (swans and geese)
  - Genus †Anserobranta Kuročkin & Ganya 1972
  - Genus †Asiavis Nesov 1986
  - Genus †"Chenopis" De Vis 1905
  - Genus †Cygnavus Lambrecht 1931
  - Genus †Cygnopterus Lambrecht 1931
  - Genus †Eremochen Brodkorb 1961
  - Genus †Megalodytes Howard 1992
  - Genus †Annakacygna Matsuoka & Hasegawa 2022
  - Genus †Paracygnus Short 1969
  - Genus †Presbychen Wetmore 1930
  - Genus †Cnemiornis Owen 1866 (New Zealand geese)
  - Genus †Afrocygnus Louchart et al. 2005
- Tribe Tadornini Reichenbach 1849–50 (shelducks and sheldgeese)
  - Genus †Australotadorna Worthy 2009
  - Genus †Brantadorna Howard 1964
  - Genus †Centrornis Andrews 1897 (Malagasy sheldgoose)
  - Genus †Miotadorna Worthy et al. 2007 (St. Bathans shelduck)
  - Genus †Nannonetta Campbell 1979
  - Genus †Pleistoanser Agnolín 2006
  - Genus †Balcanas Boev 1998
- Tribe Anatini Vigors 1825 (dabbling ducks and moa-nalos)
  - Genus †Zqueheanas Agnolin et al 2025
  - Genus †Dunstanetta Worthy et al. 2007 (Johnstone's duck)
  - Genus †Lavadytis Stidham & Hilton 2015
  - Genus †Pinpanetta Worthy 2009
  - Genus †Tirarinetta Worthy 2008
  - Genus †Chendytes Miller 1925
  - Genus †Matanas Worthy et al. 2007 (Enright's duck)
  - Genus †Shiriyanetta Watanabe & Matsuoka 2015

Unassigned extinct Anseriformes:

- †Allgoviachen Mayr et al. 2022
- †"Anas" albae Jánossy 1979 [?Mergus]
- †"Anas" amotape Campbell 1979
- †"Anas" isarensis Lambrecht 1933
- †"Anas" luederitzensis Lambrecht 1929
- †"Anas" sanctaehelenae Campbell 1979
- †"Anas" eppelsheimensis Lambrecht 1933
- †Aldabranas cabri Harrison & Walker 1978
- †Ankonetta larriestrai Cenizo & Agnolín 2010
- †Bambolinetta (Portis 1884) Mayr & Pavia 2014 [Anas lignitifila Portis 1884]
- †Cayaoa bruneti Tonni 1979
- †Chelychelynechen Olson & James 1991 (turtle-jawed moa-nalo)
- †Chenoanas deserta Zelenkov 2012
- †Cygnopterus alphonsi Cheneval 1984 [non Cygnavus senckenbergi Mlíkovský 2002]
- †Eoneornis Ameghino 1891 (nomen dubium)
- †Eutelornis Ameghino 1891 (nomen dubium)
- †Gracanicanetta Bochenski et al 2025
- †Helonetta brodkorbi Emslie 1992
- †Heteroanser vicinus (Kuročkin 1976) Zelenkov 2012 [Heterochen vicinus Kuročkin 1976; Anser vicinus (Kuročkin 1976) Mlíkovský & Švec 1986]
- †Kustokazanser (Zelenkov 2024)
- †Lavanttalornis Bochenski et al. 2023
- †Loxornis clivus Ameghino 1894
- Metopiana Bonaparte 1856 [Metopias Heine & Reichenow 1890; Phoeonetta Delacour 1937; Netta (Phoeoaythia) Delacour 1937]
- †Mioquerquedula minutissima Zelenkov & Kuročkin 2012 [Anas velox Milne-Edwards 1867]
- †Nogusunna conflictoides Zelenkov 2011
- †"Oxyura" doksana Mlíkovský 2002
- †Paracygnopterus scotti Harrison & Walker 1979
- †Proanser major Umanskaya 1979
- †Protomelanitta Zelenkov 2011
- †Ptaiochen Olson & James 1991 (small-billed moa-nalo)
- †Sharganetta mongolica Zelenkov 2011
- †Sinanas Yeh 1980
- †Talpanas Olson & James 2009 (Kaua'i mole duck)
- †Teleornis Ameghino 1899
- †Thambetochen Olson & Wetmore 1976
- †Uyrekura Zelenkov 2023
- †Wasonaka Howard 1966

In addition, a considerable number of mainly Late Cretaceous and Paleogene fossils have been described where it is uncertain whether or not they are anseriforms. This is because almost all orders of aquatic birds living today either originated or underwent a major radiation during that time, making it hard to decide whether some waterbird-like bone belongs into this family or is the product of parallel evolution in a different lineage due to adaptive pressures.

- "Presbyornithidae" gen. et sp. indet. (Barun Goyot Late Cretaceous of Udan Sayr, Mongolia) – Presbyornithidae?
- UCMP 117599 (Hell Creek Late Cretaceous of Bug Creek West, USA)
- Petropluvialis (Late Eocene of England) – may be same as Palaeopapia
- Agnopterus (Late Eocene – Late Oligocene of Europe) – includes Cygnopterus lambrechti
- "Headonornis hantoniensis" BMNH PAL 4989 (Hampstead Early Oligocene of Isle of Wight, England) – formerly "Ptenornis"
- Palaeopapia (Hampstead Early Oligocene of Isle of Wight, England)
- "Anas" creccoides (Early/Middle Oligocene of Belgium)
- "Anas" skalicensis (Early Miocene of "Skalitz", Czech Republic)
- "Anas" risgoviensis (Late Miocene of Bavaria, Germany)
- †"Anas" meyerii Milne-Edwards 1867 [Aythya meyerii (Milne-Edwards 1867) Brodkorb 1964]
- †Eonessa anaticula Wetmore 1938 {Eonessinae Wetmore 1938}
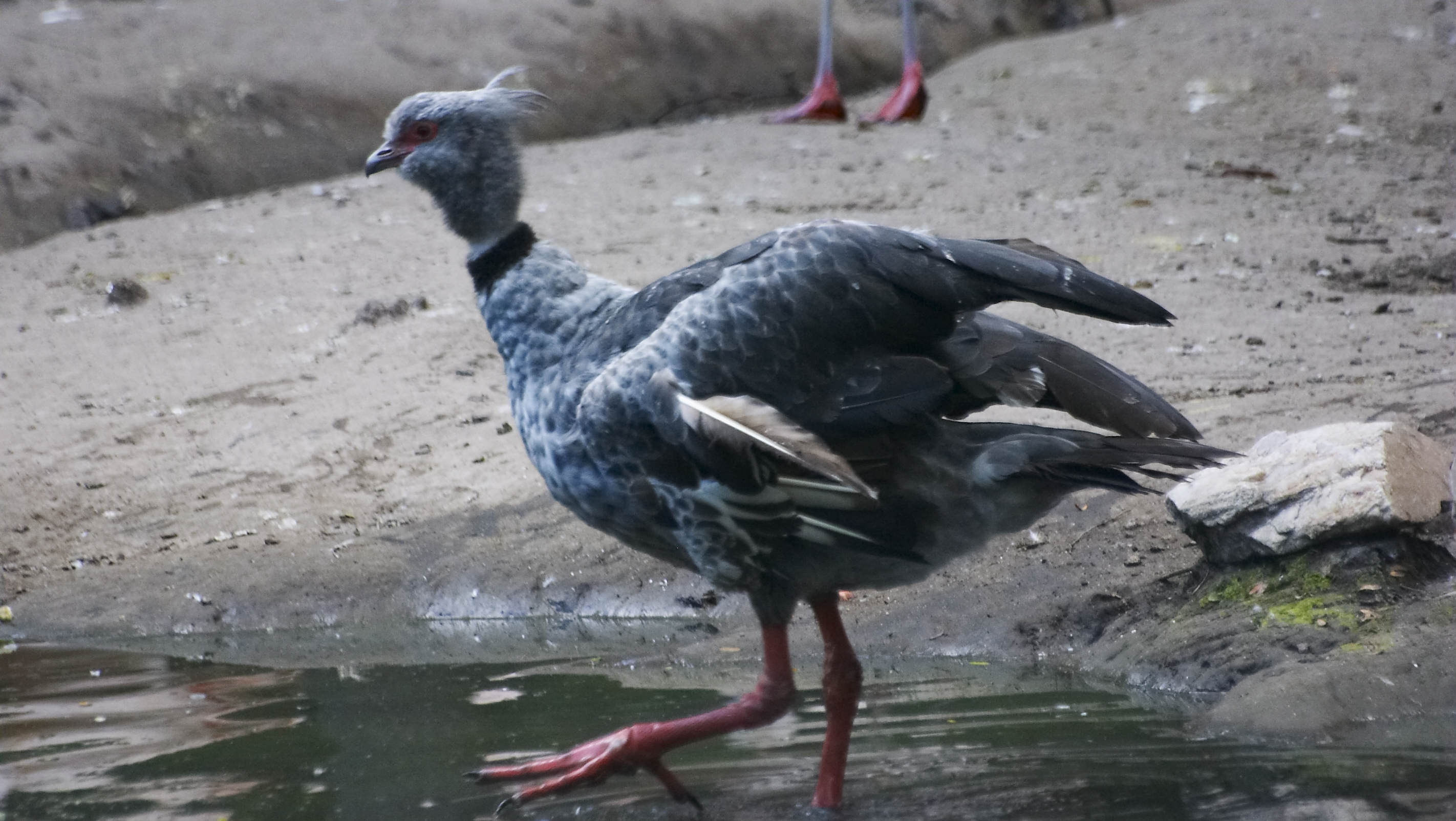
Crested screamer (Chauna torquata)

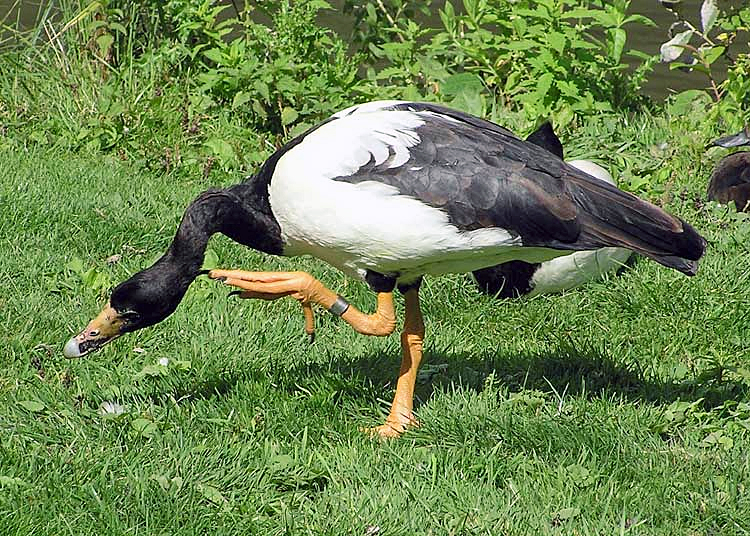
Magpie goose (Anseranas semipalmata), sole surviving member of a Mesozoic lineage

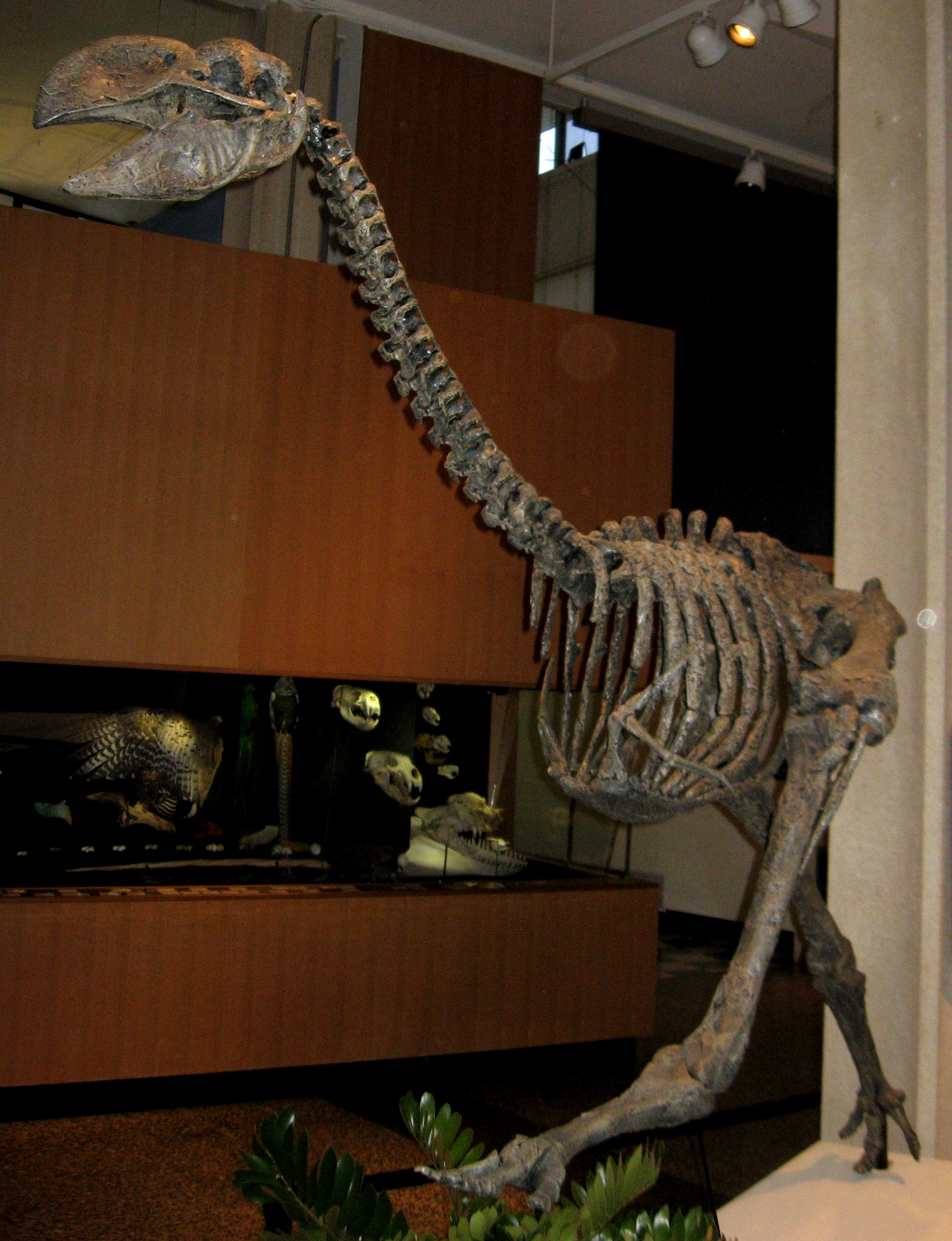
Cast of Dromornis stirtoni, a mihirung, from Australia.

== Molecular studies ==
Studies of the mitochondrial DNA suggest the existence of four branches – Anseranatidae, Dendrocygninae, Anserinae and Anatinae – with Dendrocygninae being a subfamily within the family Anatidae and Anseranatidae representing an independent family. The clade Somaterini has a single genus Somateria.

== See also ==
- List of Anseriformes by population
- List of Anseriformes

== Cited texts ==
- Agnolin, F (2007). "Brontornis burmeisteri Moreno & Mercerat, un Anseriformes (Aves) gigante del Mioceno Medio de Patagonia, Argentina". Revista del Museo Argentino de Ciencias Naturales. 9: 15–25. doi:10.22179/revmacn.9.361.
- Clarke, J. A.; Tambussi, C. P.; Noriega, J. I.; Erickson, G. M.; Ketcham, R. A. (2005). "Definitive fossil evidence for the extant avian radiation in the Cretaceous" (PDF). Nature. 433 (7023): 305–308. Bibcode:2005Natur.433..305C. doi:10.1038/nature03150. PMID 15662422. S2CID 4354309.
- Livezey, B. C.; Zusi, R. L. (2007). "Higher-order phylogeny of modern birds (Theropoda, Aves: Neornithes) based on comparative anatomy. II. Analysis and discussion". Zoological Journal of the Linnean Society. 149 (1): 1–95. doi:10.1111/j.1096-3642.2006.00293.x. PMC 2517308. PMID 18784798.
- Murray, P. F. & Vickers-Rich, P. (2004) Magnificent Mihirungs: The Colossal Flightless Birds of the Australian Dreamtime. Indiana University Press.
