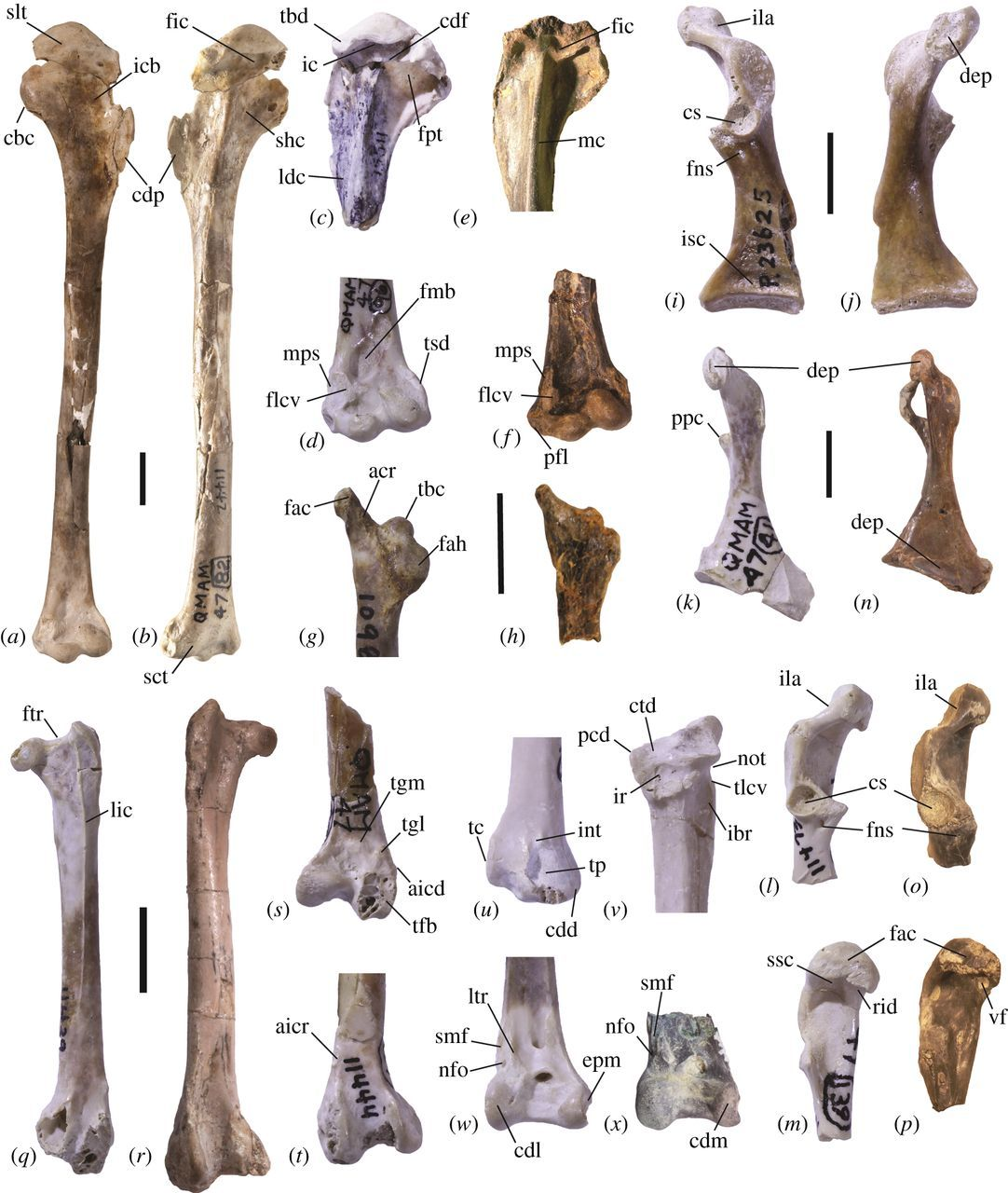
- Postcranial elements of Wilaru compared to Presbyornis pervetus

Scientific classification
- Kingdom: Animalia
- Phylum: Chordata
- Class: Aves
- Family: †Presbyornithidae
- Genus: †Wilaru; Boles et al., 2013

Type species
- †Wilaru tedfordi Boles et al., 2013

Other species
- †W. prideauxi De Pietri et al., 2020

= Wilaru =

Wilaru Temporal range: 26–22 Ma late Oligocene to early Miocene

Extinct genus of birds

Wilaru is an extinct genus of presbyornithid bird from Australia during the Late Oligocene to Early Miocene, around 26-22 million years ago. The type species is Wilaru tedfordi, and the second species is Wilaru prideauxi.

== Discovery and naming ==
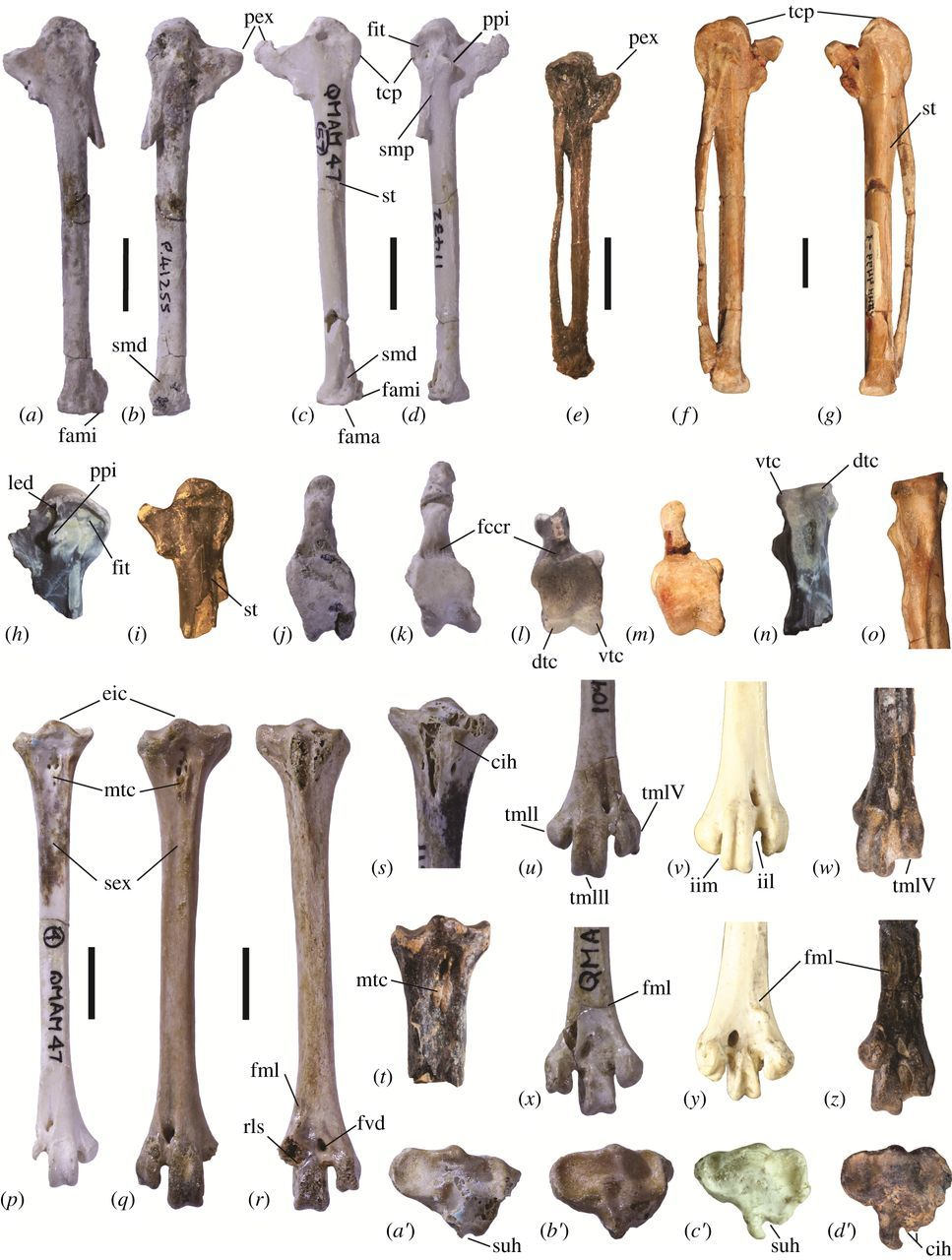
Postcranial elements of presbyornithids (Wilaru, Presbyornis and Teviornis) and southern screamer

The type species, Wilaru tedfordi, was described from fossil material collected from Lake Pinpa, Lake Palankarinna and Billeroo Creek, specifically in the Namba Formation of Lake Eyre Basin, north-eastern South Australia. The genus name Wilaru is the term for “stone curlew” in the Diyari language of the Lake Eyre region. The specific epithet of the type species W. tedfordi honours American palaeontologist Richard H. Tedford (1929–2011) of the American Museum of Natural History, who led the 1971 expedition to Lake Pinpa during which much of the descriptive material was collected.

The second species, Wilaru prideauxi, was first named in 2016 after the Australian vertebrate paleontologist Gavin Prideaux, who worked on Lake Ngapakaldi of the Wipajiri Formation in South Australia where the specimen of W. prideauxi was discovered and on various Australian mammals which lived during the Oligocene to Miocene epochs. W. prideauxi was properly named in 2020 after the authors republished the study as a correction with Zoobank Registration. The holotype of W. tedfordi is a left humerus (SAMA P48925), while the holotype of W. prideauxi is a right tarsometatarsus (SAMA P53136).

== Description and ecology ==
Compared to other presbyornithids, Willaru appeared to have been specialised to a more terrestrial lifestyle, based on its tarsometatarsal morphology. In particular, the latter W. prideauxi appears to have been more specialised towards terrestriality than the earlier W. tedfordi, being larger and more robust, indicating a clear speciation towards this lifestyle and therefore a direct species sequence.

Like many modern waterfowl, the Willaru species had spurs and knobs on their carpals. Like the closely related modern-day screamers, these were almost certainly used to fight, indicating perhaps territorial habits, as opposed to the more gregarious nature of earlier presbyornithids.

Willaru co-existed with several anatid and anseranatid species, indicating that there was little ecological competition. It is possible that a speciation towards terrestriality might have spared it from competition with more derived waterfowl, allowing it to live longer than other presbyornithids.

== Classification ==
It was originally classified as a stone-curlew, but subsequently it was argued to be the youngest member of the extinct family Presbyornithidae instead. The discovery of a similar Eocene presbyornithid Murgonornis archeri also supported this taxonomic assignment. A 2024 phylogenetic analysis recovered Wilaru within various positions of Galloanserae, making its identity as a presbyornithid questionable. However, a 2025 study which reported a nearly complete skull of Vegavis revised the phylogenetic analyses of Galloanserae and recovered Wilaru as a member of the Presbyornithidae within Anseriformes.
