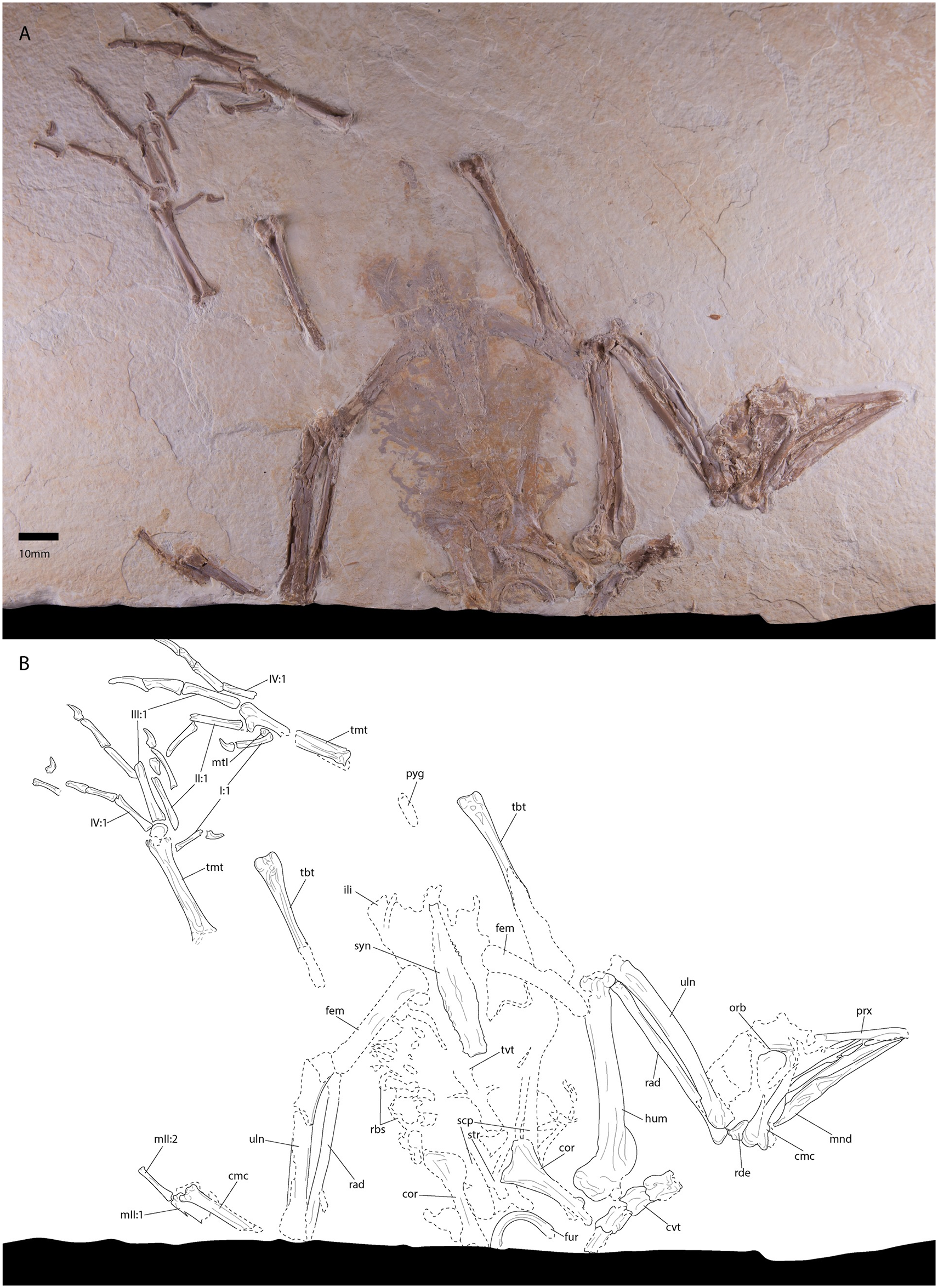
- Paakniwatavis holotype

Scientific classification
- Kingdom: Animalia
- Phylum: Chordata
- Class: Aves
- Order: Anseriformes
- Genus: †Paakniwatavis; Musser & Clarke, 2024
- Species: †P. grandei

Binomial name
- †Paakniwatavis grandei Musser & Clarke, 2024

= Paakniwatavis =

Paakniwatavis Temporal range: early Eocene (Ypresian), ~51.97 Ma

Genus of extinct waterfowl

Paakniwatavis (meaning "Water Spirit bird") is a genus of extinct waterfowl from the early Eocene Green River Formation of Wyoming, United States. The genus contains a single species, P. grandei, known from a partial skeleton with a skull.

== Discovery and naming ==
The Paakniwatavis holotype specimen, FMNH PA725, was discovered in sediments of the Green River Formation (Fossil Butte Member) near Lincoln County, Wyoming, United States. The specimen consists of a nearly complete skeleton with the skull, preserved two-dimensionally on a single slab.

In 2024, Musser & Clarke described Paakniwatavis grandei as a new genus and species of basal anseriform birds based on these fossil remains. The generic name, Paakniwatavis, combines a reference to the Paakniwat—the supernatural "Water Spirits" or "Water Babies" of Shoshoni legend—with the Latin word "avis", meaning "bird, referencing the presumed aquatic habitat occupied by the species. The specific name, grandei, honors researcher Lance Grande, the discoverer of the holotype specimen.
