= Sharganetta =

Sharganetta Temporal range: Middle Miocene

Scientific classification
- Kingdom: Animalia
- Phylum: Chordata
- Class: Aves
- Order: Anseriformes
- Family: Anatidae
- Genus: †Sharganetta
- Species: †S. mongolica

Binomial name
- †Sharganetta mongolica Zelenkov, 2011

Extinct genus of anatid

Sharganetta is an extinct genus of anatid that lived during the Middle Miocene.

== Distribution ==
Sharganetta mongolica is known from the Sharga fossil site in Mongolia.
