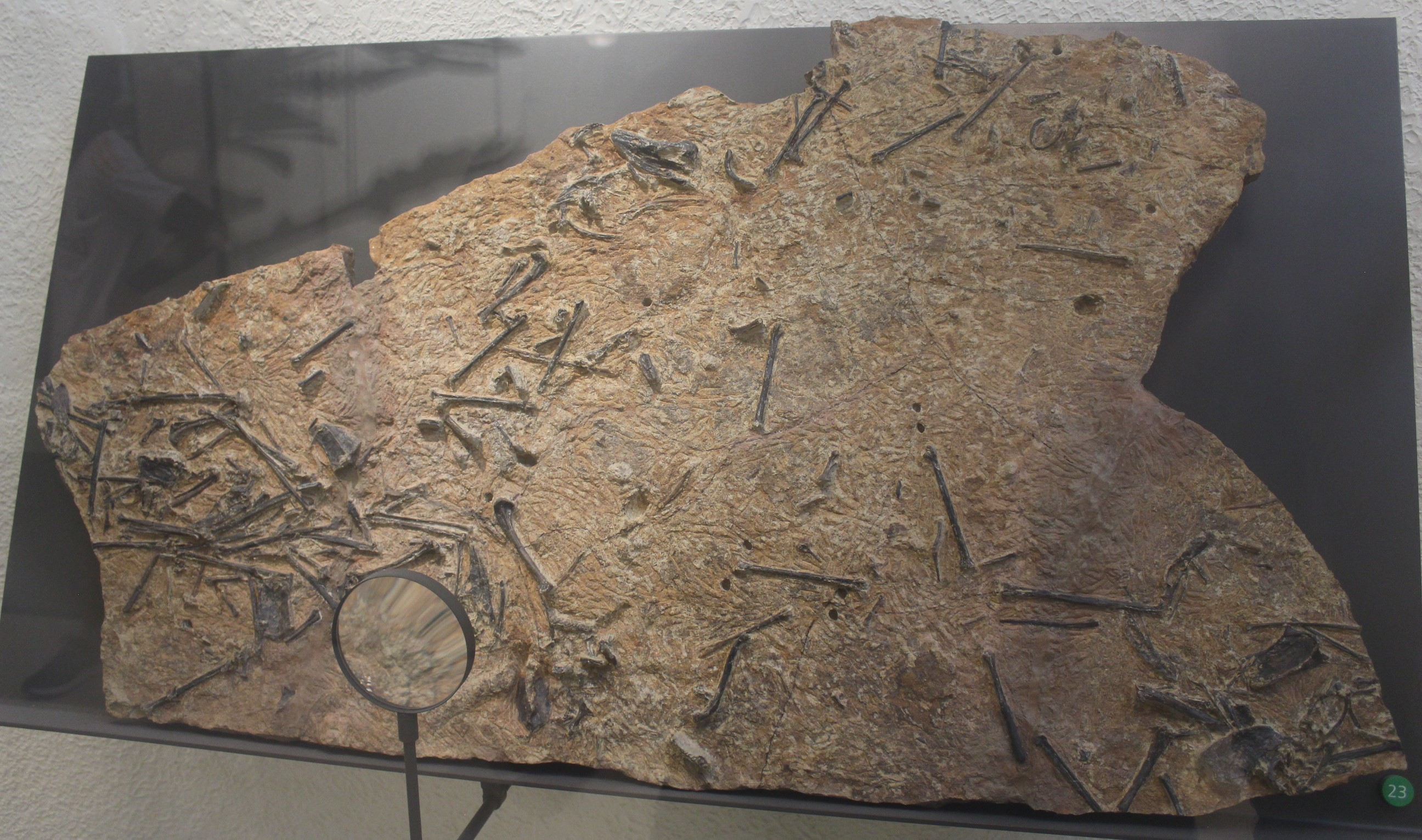
- An assemblage of Presbyornis pervetus skeletons (AMNH 28505)

Scientific classification
- Kingdom: Animalia
- Phylum: Chordata
- Class: Aves
- Family: †Presbyornithidae
- Genus: †Presbyornis; Wetmore, 1926

Species
- †P. pervetus Wetmore, 1926 (type); †P. recurvirostra (Note: This species was first described as Coltonia recurvirostra by John William Hardy in 1959. Ericson (2000) reclassified it as a species of Presbyornis by the name P. recurvirostrus, and this species was also referred to as P. recurvirostris by Kurochkin, Dyke & Karhu (2002) and Kurochkin & Dyke (2010). However, since recurvirostra is a noun in apposition, combining the Latin recurvus meaning 'bent' or 'curved backwards' with rostrum meaning 'bill', the original spelling is to be maintained regardless of the change in generic gender, as noted by ICZN Article 31.2.1. Thus, P. recurvirostra is the correct spelling, as used by De Pietri et al. (2016) and Worthy et al. (2023).) (Hardy, 1959); †P. isoni Olson, 1994; †"P." mongoliensis Kurochkin & Dyke, 2010

Synonyms
- Nautilornis Wetmore, 1926; Coltonia Hardy, 1959

= Presbyornis =

Presbyornis Temporal range: Late Paleocene–Early Eocene

Extinct genus of birds

Presbyornis is an extinct genus of presbyornithid bird from North America during the Paleogene period, between the Late Paleocene and Early Eocene.

== History of discovery ==
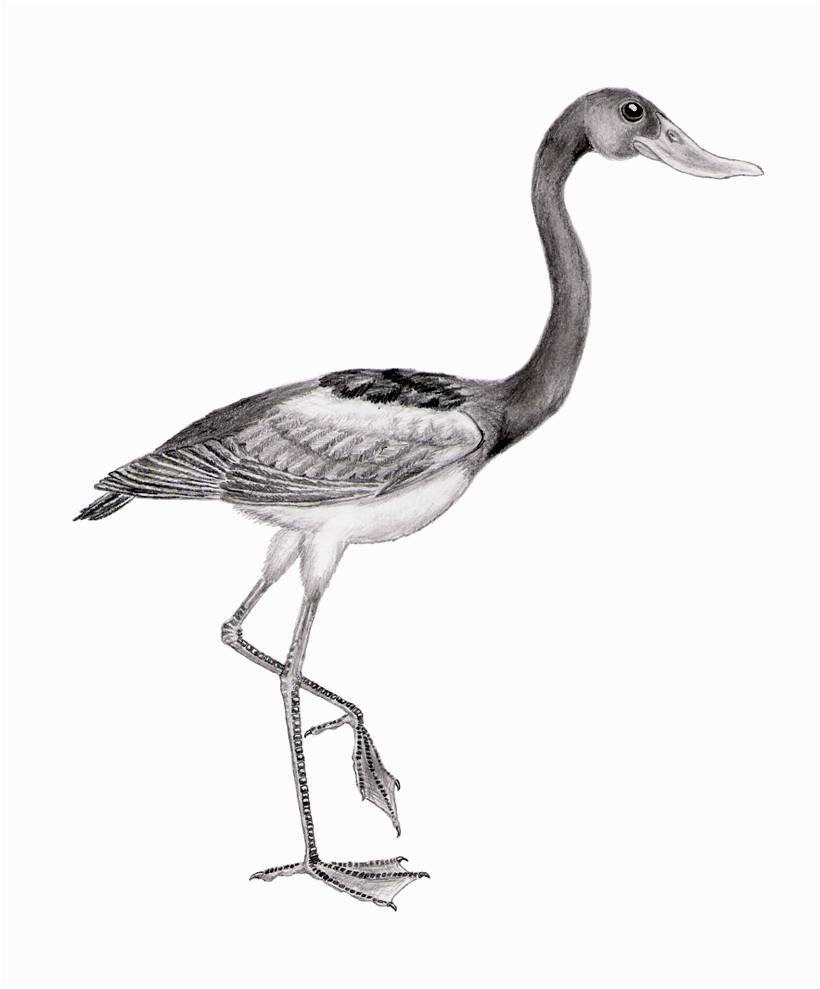
Life restoration of P. pervetus

The fossil record of P. pervetus includes many complete skeletons from Green River Formation sites (Early Eocene), suggesting that the birds nested in colonies and that they possibly died due to volcanism or botulism, the latter of which is similar to many colony-nesting waterfowl or shorebirds today. Fossils identified as P. cf. pervetus have been discovered from the Margaret Formation of Ellesmere Island, where the remains of Gastornis sp. have also been found.

P. recurvirostra is known from a partial wing (KUVP 10105) found in the Colton Formation, from the Late Paleocene to Early Eocene sediments of the Wasatch Plateau near Ephraim, Utah. P. isoni, much larger than P. pervetus, is known from the Late Paleocene Aquia Formation in Maryland, based on the partial humerus (USNM 294116) and partial fingerbone (USNM 294117) that were initially described, as well as a complete humerus (SMM P96.9.2). Three humeri that were initially believed to be from Headonornis are suggested to belong to P. isoni, and the holotype coracoid of Headonornis may also be assigned to as P. isoni, though these claims require additional material for confirmation. However, Headonornis is now referred to as a stem group representative of the Phoenicopteriformes.

The holotype and paratypes of "P." mongoliensis are known from the Early Eocene of Mongolia, but these fragmentary specimens are poorly preserved and they likely belong to a stem Phoenicopterimorphae, not a presbyornithid. Undescribed fossils are also known from the Paleocene of Utah. Wunketru howardae, previously thought to be a species of Telmabates or a junior synonym of P. pervetus, is now considered a distinct anseriform.

== Description ==
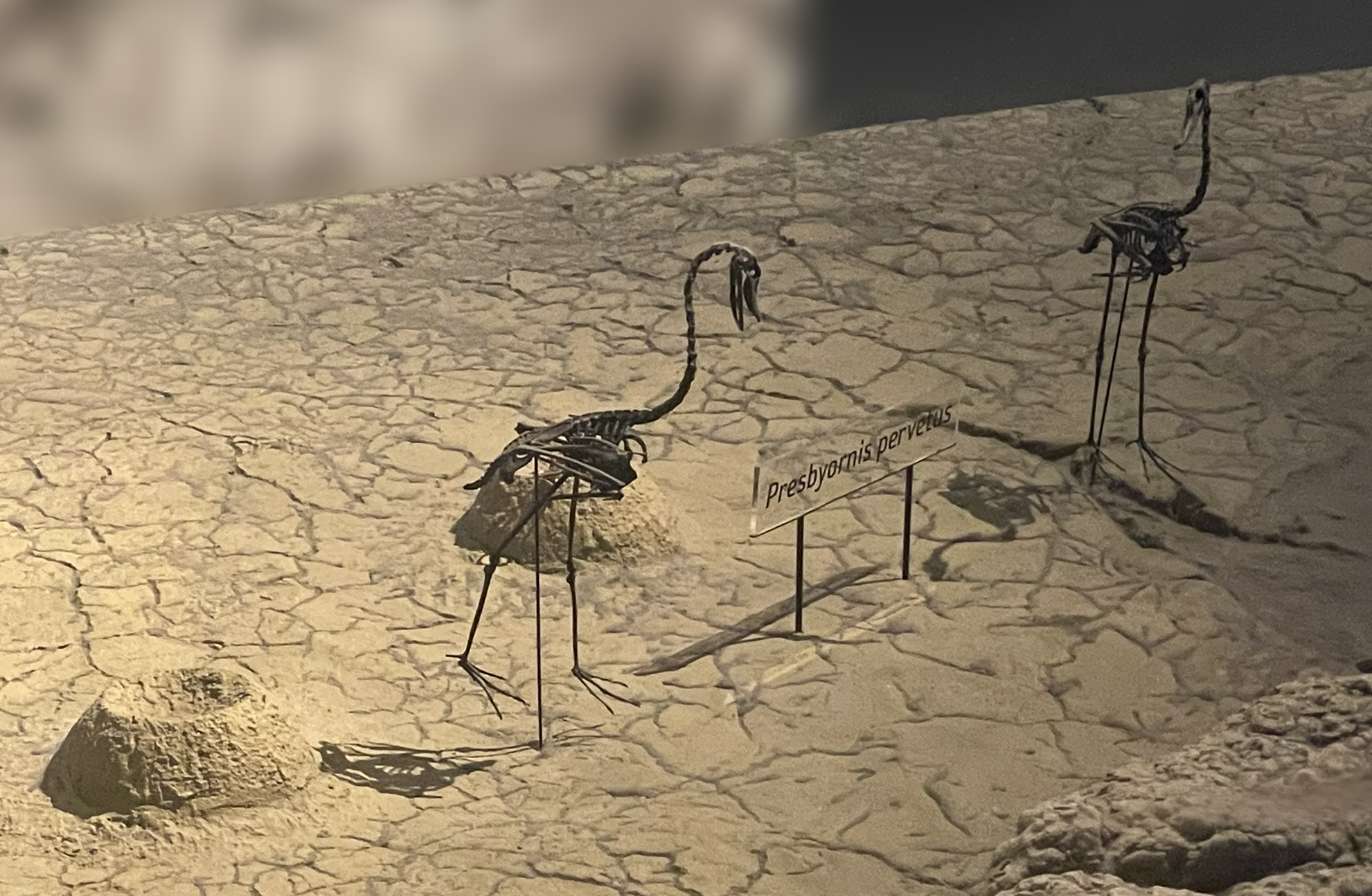
Reconstructed skeletons of P. pervetus exhibiting colonial nesting behavior (UMNH)

Along with Teviornis, Presbyornis was one of the earliest stem anseriforms. Because of its long legs and neck, Presbyornis could stand up to 1 metre (3.3 ft) tall and was initially mistaken for a flamingo, but it was reclassified as an anseriform when the duck-like anatomy of its skull and bill was found. Later, it was believed to represent a transitional stage between the anseriforms and the shorebirds, but it is now considered a member of an extinct group of anseriforms which was most closely related to modern screamers. Judging from numerous fossil findings, Presbyornis is presumed to have lived in colonies around shallow lakes. Its broad, flat bill was used to filter food (small plants and animals) from the water, in the manner of today's dabbling ducks.
