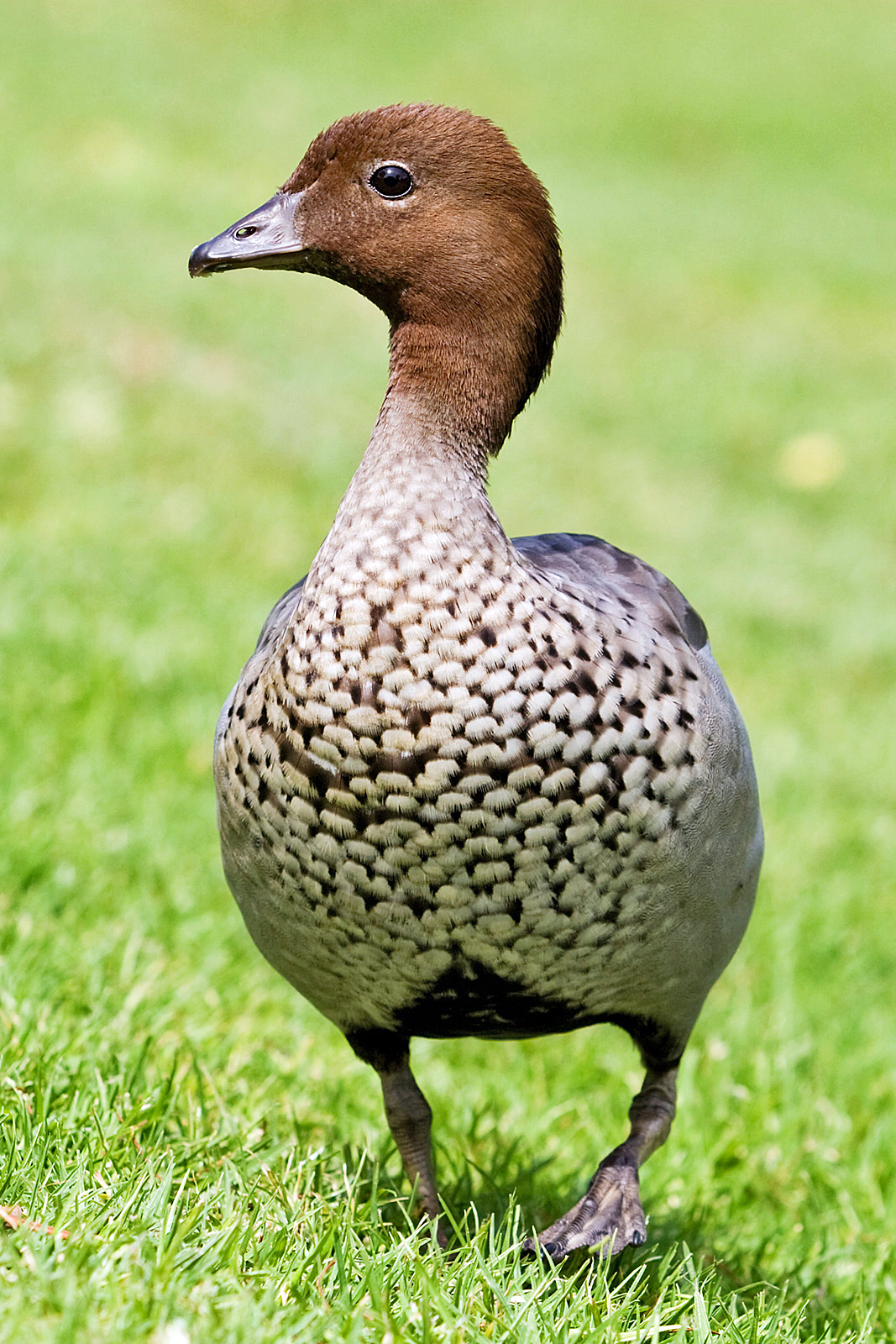
- Australian wood duck (Chenonetta jubata)

Scientific classification
- Kingdom: Animalia
- Phylum: Chordata
- Class: Aves
- Order: Anseriformes
- Family: Anatidae
- Subfamily: Anatinae
- Genus: Chenonetta; Brandt, 1836

Type species
- Anser lophotus von Brandt, 1836

Species
- See text

= Chenonetta =

Genus of birds

Chenonetta is a genus of dabbling duck. One species is extinct, while the other is extant.

== Species ==
The genus includes the following two species:

- Australian wood duck (Chenonetta jubata), Australia
- †Finsch's duck (Chenonetta finschi) — extinct, 1870, New Zealand
