= Helonetta =

Helonetta Temporal range: Late Pliocene

Scientific classification
- Kingdom: Animalia
- Phylum: Chordata
- Class: Aves
- Order: Anseriformes
- Family: Anatidae
- Genus: †Helonetta
- Species: †H. brodkorpi

Binomial name
- †Helonetta brodkorpi Emslie, 1992

Extinct genus of birds

Helonetta is an extinct genus of anatid that lived during the Piacenzian stage of the Pliocene epoch.

== Distribution ==
Helonetta brodkorpi is known from the Tamiami Formation of Florida.
