= Eonessa =

Eonessa Temporal range: Middle Eocene

Scientific classification
- Kingdom: Animalia
- Phylum: Chordata
- Class: Aves
- Order: Anseriformes
- Family: Anatidae
- Subfamily: †Eonessinae
- Genus: †Eonessa; Wetmore, 1938
- Species: †E. anaticula

Binomial name
- †Eonessa anaticula Wetmore, 1938

Extinct genus of birds

Eonessa is an enigmatic genus of bird possibly belonging to bird order Gruiformes and which consists of the single species Eonessa anaticula.

It was first described by Alexander Wetmore in the Journal of Paleontology in May 1938. In his paper, Wetmore erected the Anatidae subfamily Eonessinae, and placed Eonessa as the oldest Anatidae genus in the fossil record. This placement was possibly due to a resemblance to the modern ruddy duck (Oxyura jamaicensis), although Wetmore did not explain his taxonomic placement in the describing paper.

Restudy of the holotype specimen in 1978 by Storrs Olson and Alan Feduccia resulted in the removal of Eonessa from Anatidae. Olson and Feduccia placed the genus as Aves incertae sedis noting it was possibly a member of the polymorphic order Gruiformes. The holotype was collected on 26 August 1936, from the Myton Pocket, Duchesne County, Utah, USA. The quarry is on the Myton Member of the Uinta Formation and dates to the Middle Eocene, around 46-42 million years ago.

Now in the Princeton University paleontology collections as specimen number 14399, the holotype and only known specimen is a 13 cm (5 in) long partial wing, consisting of metacarpals down to the partial humerus. Though found articulated, the bones were badly crushed during fossilization. The bones, after further matrix removal in the 1970s, are very slender and with little diagnostic detail and little to no similarity to modern Anatidae members. The general proportions are closer to Gruiformes birds that have been found in the same rock formations; however, the lack of detail does not allow firm placement into the order.
