= Nogusunna =

Nogusunna Temporal range: Middle Miocene

Scientific classification
- Kingdom: Animalia
- Phylum: Chordata
- Class: Aves
- Order: Anseriformes
- Family: Anatidae
- Genus: †Nogusunna
- Species: †N. conflictoides

Binomial name
- †Nogusunna conflictoides Zelenkov, 2011

Extinct genus of anatid

Nogusunna is an extinct genus of anatid that lived during the Middle Miocene.

== Distribution ==
Nogusunna conflictoides is known from the Sharga fossil site in Mongolia.
