= Wunketru =

Wunketru Temporal range: Early Eocene

Scientific classification
- Kingdom: Animalia
- Phylum: Chordata
- Class: Aves
- Clade: Anserimorphae
- Order: Anseriformes
- Genus: †Wunketru; De Mendoza, Degrange & Tambussi, 2024
- Species: †W. howardae

Binomial name
- †Wunketru howardae (Cracraft, 1970)

Synonyms
- Telmabates howardae Cracraft, 1970

Extinct genus of waterfowl

Wunketru is an extinct genus of waterfowl from the Eocene Las Flores Formation of Chubut Province, Argentina. The genus contains a single species, Wunketru howardae, known from a partial skeleton previously classified as a species of Telmabates.

== Discovery and naming ==
The holotype, consisting of ninety mineralized bones, all somewhat distorted, such as small skull fragments, the main bones of the leg, wing, and pectoral girdle, the manubrial end of the sternum including part of the keel, a pelvis fragment, a sacrum, and a few vertebrae, was described as being similar to Telmabates antiquus by Howard (1955). The fossils were named as Telmabates howardae by Cracraft (1970).. Feduccia and McGrew (1974) considered T. howardae to be a junior synonym of Presbyornis pervetus.

In 2024, De Mendoza, Degrange & Tambussi named and described Wunketru howardae as they found the species to be separate from Telmabates. Translated from Mapudungun, Wunketru literally means 'dawn duck'.

== Classification ==
In 2024, Wunketru was classified as a member of Anseriformes incertae sedis.
