= Murgonornis =

Murgonornis Temporal range: Ypresian

Scientific classification
- Kingdom: Animalia
- Phylum: Chordata
- Class: Aves
- Family: †Presbyornithidae
- Genus: †Murgonornis
- Species: †M. archeri

Binomial name
- †Murgonornis archeri Worthy et al., 2023

Extinct genus of birds

Murgonornis is an extinct genus of presbyornithid that lived during the Eocene.

== Distribution ==
Murgonornis archeri is known from the Murgon fossil site in Queensland, Australia.
