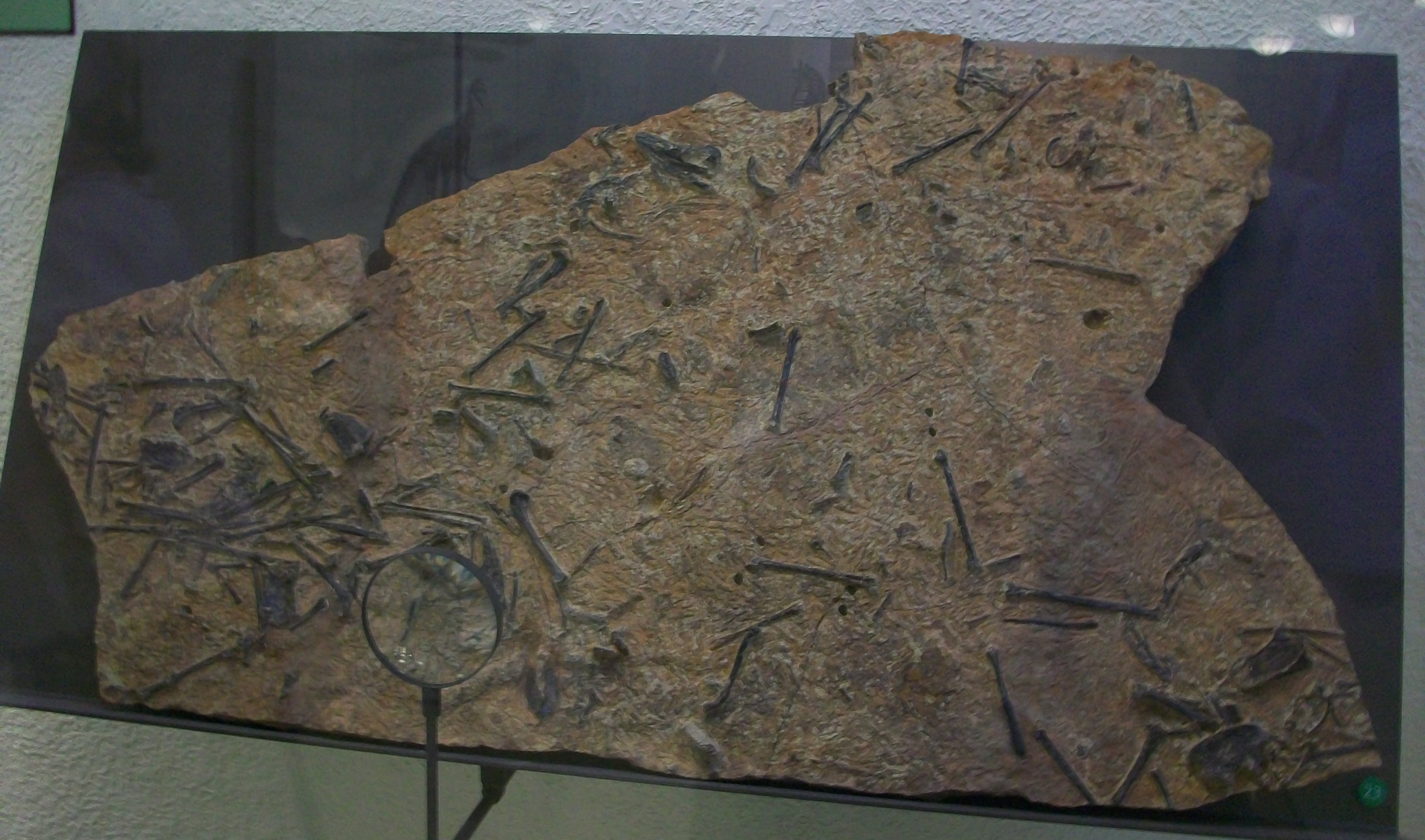
- Presbyornis pervetus

Scientific classification
- Kingdom: Animalia
- Phylum: Chordata
- Class: Aves
- Clade: Anserimorphae
- Family: †Presbyornithidae; Wetmore, 1926

Genera
- †Bumbalavis Zelenkov, 2021; †Murgonornis Worthy et al., 2023; †Presbyornis Wetmore, 1926; †Telmabates Howard, 1955; †Teviornis Kuročkin, Dyke & Karhu, 2002; †Wilaru Boles et al., 2013

= Presbyornithidae =

Presbyornithidae Temporal range: Maastrichtian–Aquitanian

Extinct family of birds

Presbyornithidae is an extinct group of birds found in North America, South America, East Asia, Australia and possibly North Africa. They had evolved by the Maastrichtian age of the Late Cretaceous and became extinct during the Aquitanian age of the Early Miocene. The family contains the oldest known neognath, Teviornis from the Nemegt Formation of Mongolia.

Initially, presbyornithids were believed to present a mix of characters shown by waterbirds, shorebirds and flamingos and were used to argue for an evolutionary relationship between these groups, but they are now generally accepted to be waterfowl closely related to modern ducks, geese, and screamers. They were generally long-legged, long-necked birds, standing around one meter high, with the body of a duck, feet similar to a wader but webbed, and a flat duck-like bill adapted for filter feeding. At least some species were social birds that lived in large flocks and nested in colonies, while others like Wilaru were terrestrial and territorial.

Specimens of presbyornithids have also been discovered from the Lance Formation of Wyoming. Other possible Eocene presbyornithids include Presbyornis mongoliensis from Mongolia, Proherodius oweni and Headonornis hantoniensis from England with the partial right scapula BMNH PAL 4989, but P. oweni is now considered as Aves incertae sedis, and the two other taxa are now referred to as stem group representatives of the Phoenicopteriformes.
