= Telmabates =

Telmabates Temporal range: Eocene, 48.6–38.2 Ma

Scientific classification
- Domain: Eukaryota
- Kingdom: Animalia
- Phylum: Chordata
- Class: Aves
- Clade: Anserimorphae
- Family: †Presbyornithidae
- Genus: †Telmabates; Howard, 1955
- Species: †T. antiquus

Binomial name
- †Telmabates antiquus Howard, 1955

Extinct genus of presbyornithid bird

Telmabates is an extinct genus of presbyornithid bird from the Eocene Bird Clay Locality of the Sarmiento Formation of Chubut Province, Argentina. The genus contains a single species, T. antiquus.

Telmabates antiquus was named and described by Howard (1955). A second species, T. howardae was named by Cracraft (1970), but De Mendoza, Degrange & Tambussi (2024) moved T. howardae to the new species Wunketru howardae as they found the species to be separate from Telmabates.
