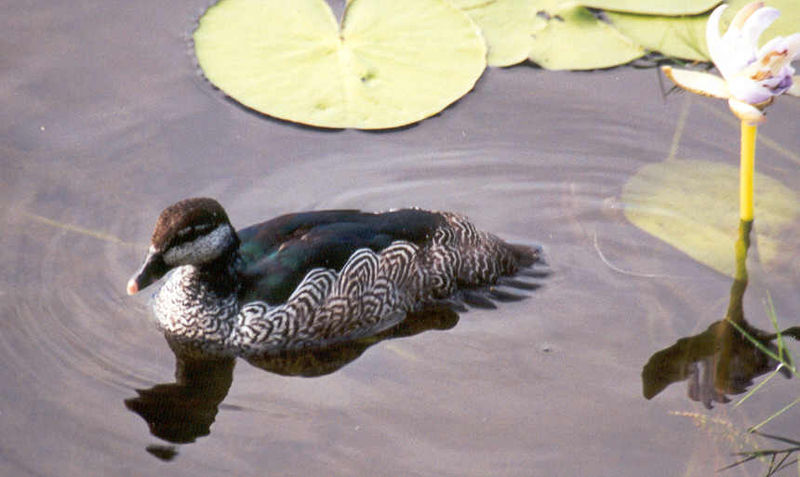
- Green pygmy goose

Scientific classification
- Kingdom: Animalia
- Phylum: Chordata
- Class: Aves
- Order: Anseriformes
- Suborder: Anseres
- Superfamily: Anatoidea
- Family: Anatidae
- Genus: Nettapus; Brandt, 1836

Type species
- Anas madagascariensis = Anas aurita Gmelin, 1789

Species
- Nettapus pulchellus; Nettapus coromandelianus; Nettapus auritus
- Distribution N. auritus N. c. coromandelianus N. c. albipennis N. pulchellus

= Pygmy goose =

Pygmy geese

Genus of birds

Pygmy geese are a group of very small "perching ducks" in the genus Nettapus which breed in the Old World tropics. They are the smallest of all wildfowl. As the "perching ducks" are a paraphyletic group, they need to be placed elsewhere. The initially assumed relationship with the dabbling duck subfamily Anatinae has been questioned, and it appears they form a lineage in an ancient Gondwanan radiation of waterfowl, within which they are of unclear affinities. An undescribed fossil species from the late Hemphillian (5.0–4.1 mya) of Jalisco, central Mexico, has also been identified from the distal end of a tarsometatarsus. It is only record of the genus in the New World.

The genus Nettapus was erected by the German naturalist Johann Friedrich von Brandt in 1836. The name is from Ancient Greek nētta meaning "duck" and pous meaning "foot". It was thought that the type species, the African pygmy goose (Nettapus auritus), possessed the feet and body of a duck and the neck of a goose.

There are three extant species in the genus:

Image	Scientific name	Common name	Distribution
	Nettapus auritus	African pygmy goose	Sub-Saharan Africa
	Nettapus coromandelianus	Cotton pygmy goose	Middle East, Indian Subcontinent, Southeast Asia and North-eastern Australia
	Nettapus pulchellus	Green pygmy goose	Northern Australia and southern New Guinea

Pygmy geese have short bills, rounded heads and short legs. They nest in tree holes.

== See also ==
- Smallest organisms
