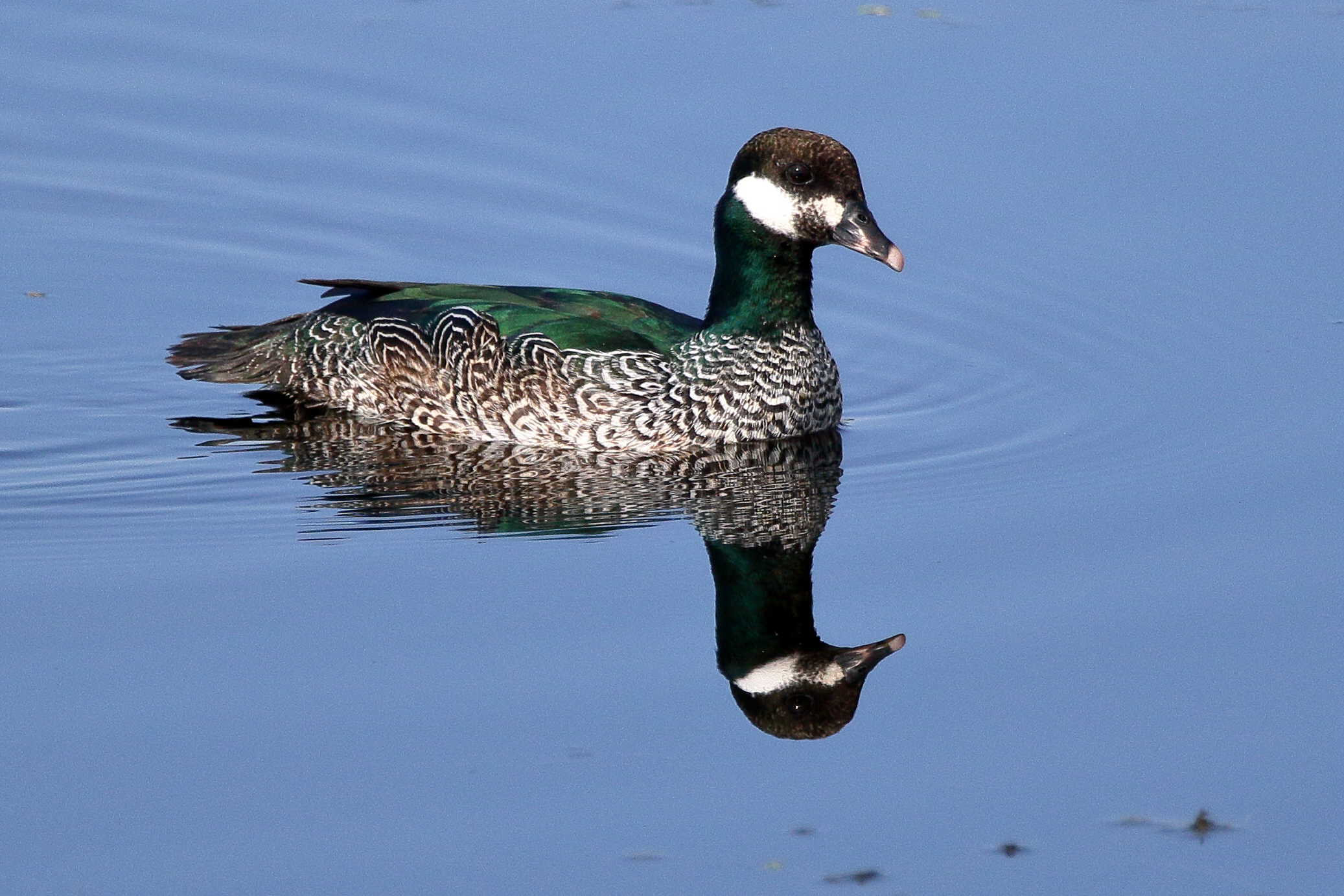

Conservation status
- Least Concern (IUCN 3.1)

Scientific classification
- Kingdom: Animalia
- Phylum: Chordata
- Class: Aves
- Order: Anseriformes
- Family: Anatidae
- Genus: Nettapus
- Species: N. pulchellus

Binomial name
- Nettapus pulchellus Gould, 1842
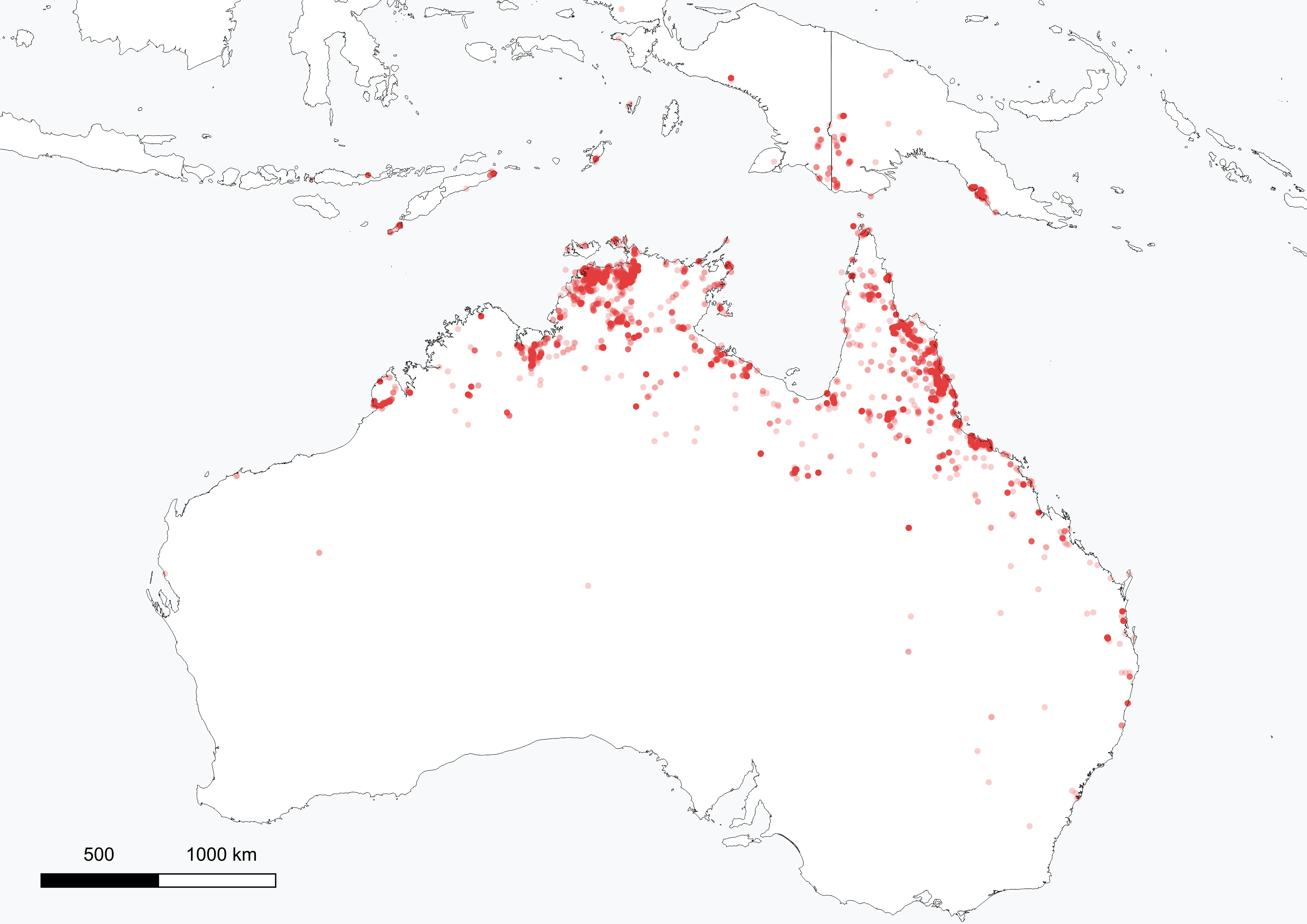
- Species distribution

= Green pygmy goose =

Species of bird

The green pygmy goose (Nettapus pulchellus) is a small perching duck which breeds in southern New Guinea and northern Australia.

== Taxonomy ==
First described in 1842 by the ornithologist John Gould, its specific name is derived from diminutive of the Latin adjective pulcher "pretty". It is one of three species in the Afro-Asian genus Nettapus, an ancient and unusual group of ducks. No subspecies are recognised.

== Description ==
Ranging from 30 to 36 cm (12 to 14 in) in length, the green pygmy goose is one of the smallest species of duck. It has a 48 to 60 cm (19 to 23.5 in) wingspan. It has a small bill and a compact form. The breeding male has a predominantly dark green back and neck, and a dark gray crown. The cheeks are white, and the underparts are pale grey and white scalloped. The tail, primary flight feathers and primary coverts are black, while the secondary flight feathers are white. The secondary coverts are a dark iridescent green. This iridescence is lost outside of the breeding season and the plumage becomes duller. The species exhibits a degree of sexual dimorphism — the female has a barred rather than green neck but otherwise resembles the non-breeding male. Immature birds are less brightly coloured, and have mottled dark brown heads.

The male has a high-pitched whistle and the female a lower-pitched call.

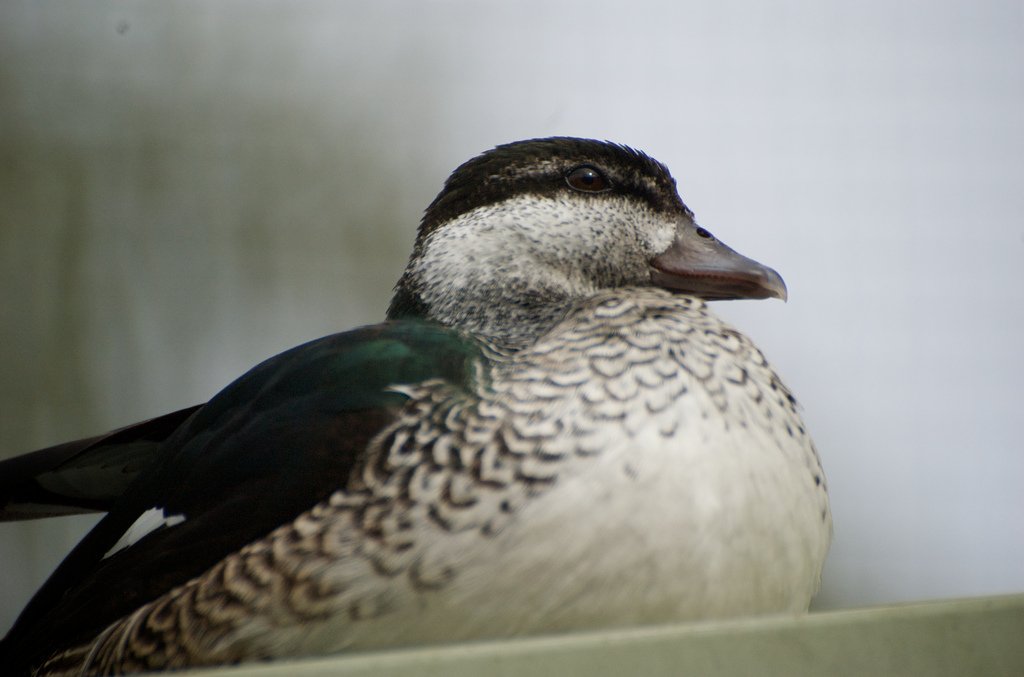
Adult female, Perth Zoo

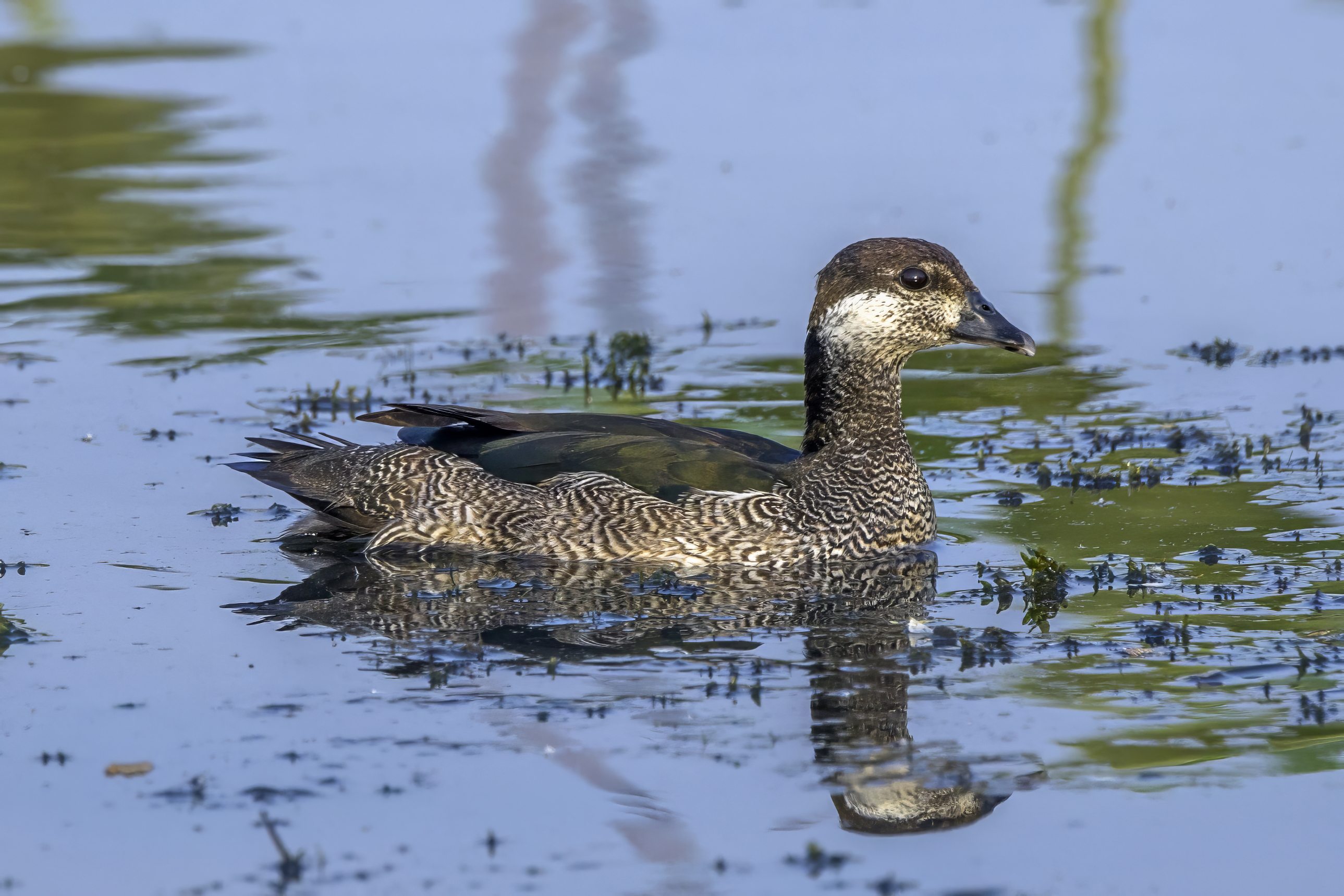
Immature, The Northern Territory

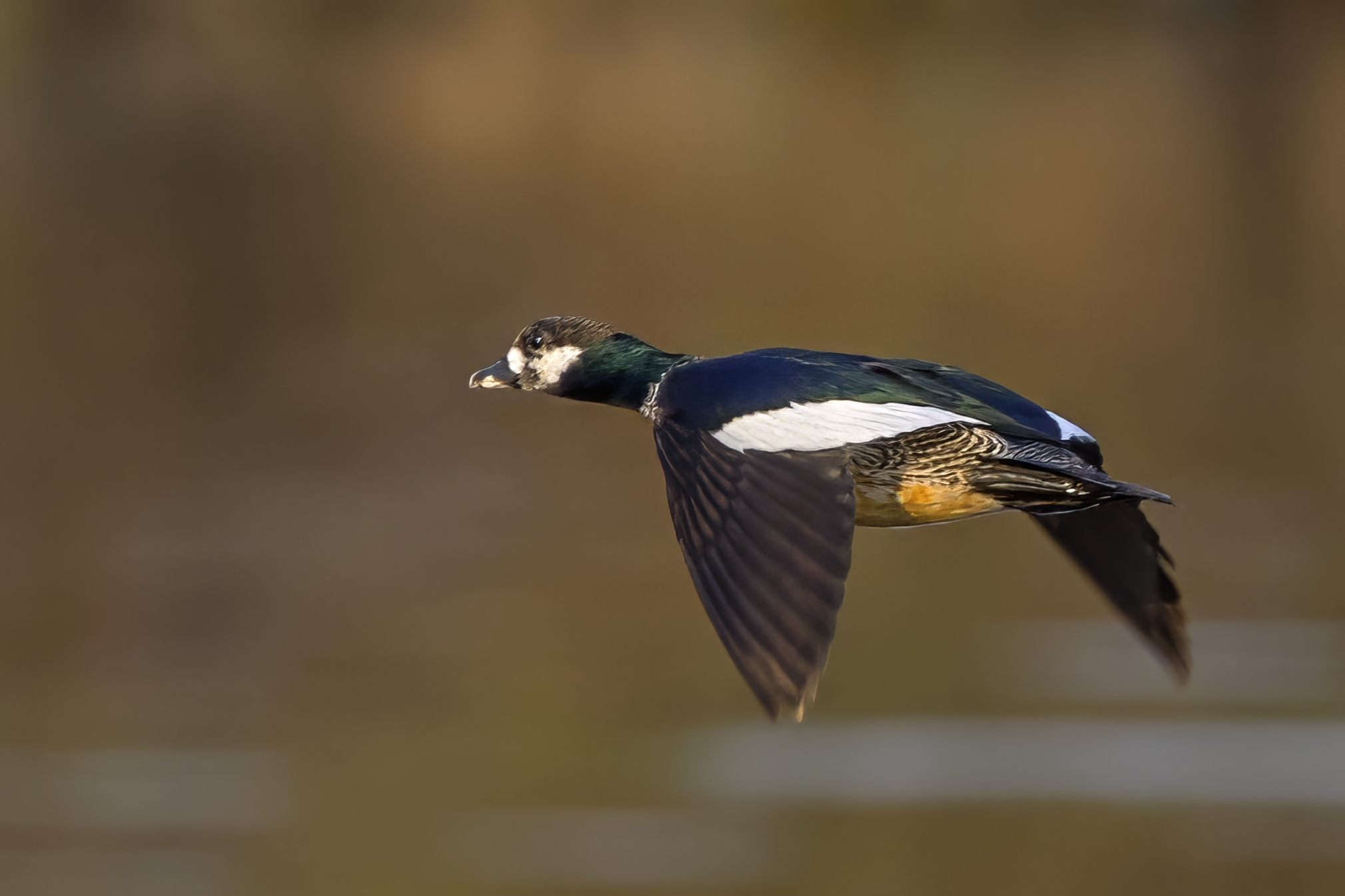
Male, The Northern Territory

== Distribution ==
The green pygmy goose is found in southern New Guinea and across northern Australia (from Western Australia, through Northern Territory and into Queensland). To the west, it commonly reaches Timor-Leste, where it possibly breeds at Lake Iralalara. It is largely resident, apart from dispersion in the wet season. The habitat is well-vegetated lowland lagoons and other permanent fresh waters.

== Breeding ==
The green pygmy goose nests in tree hollows. Eight to twelve eggs are laid and the incubation period is 26 days.
