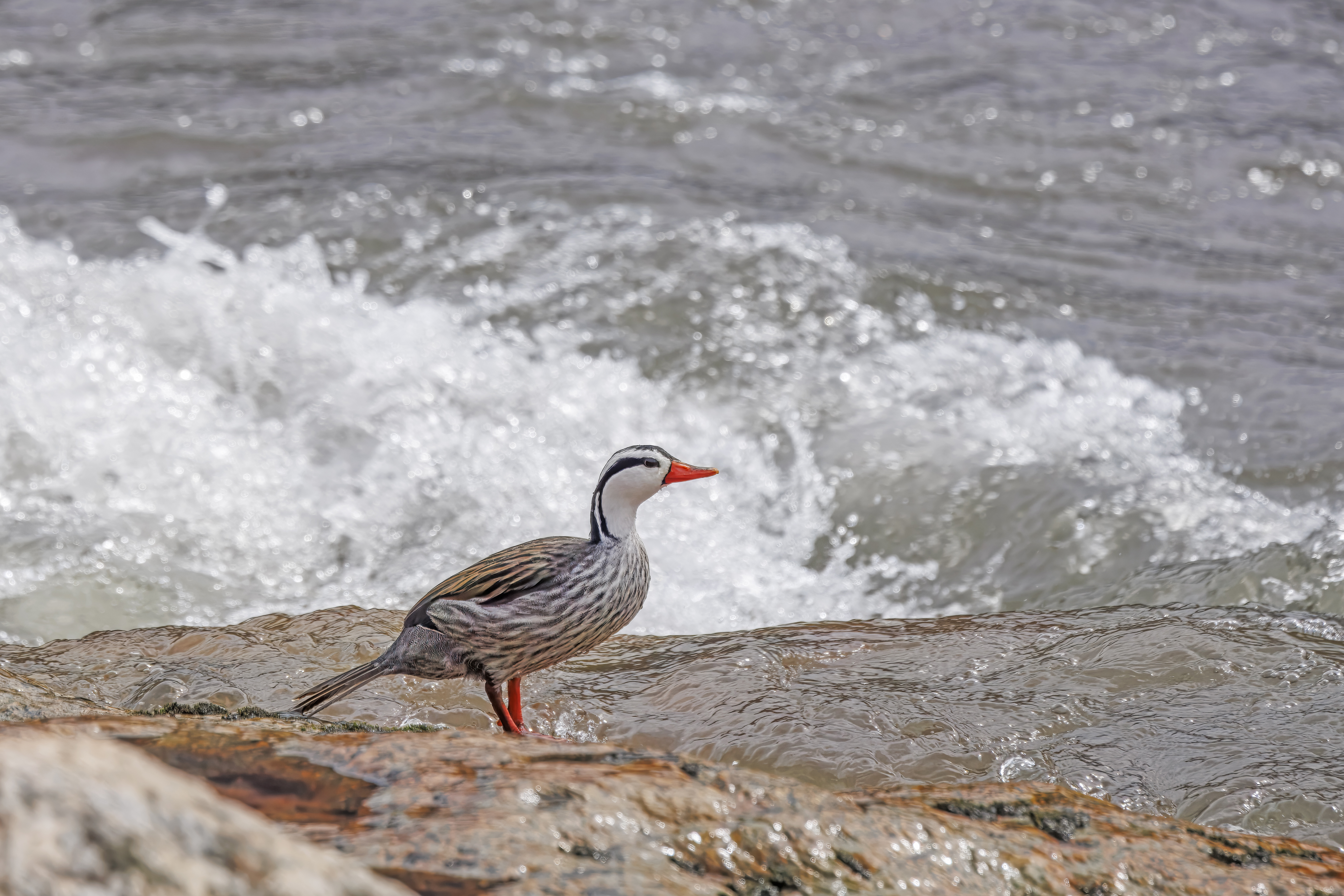
- Male, Rio Cosanga, Ecuador
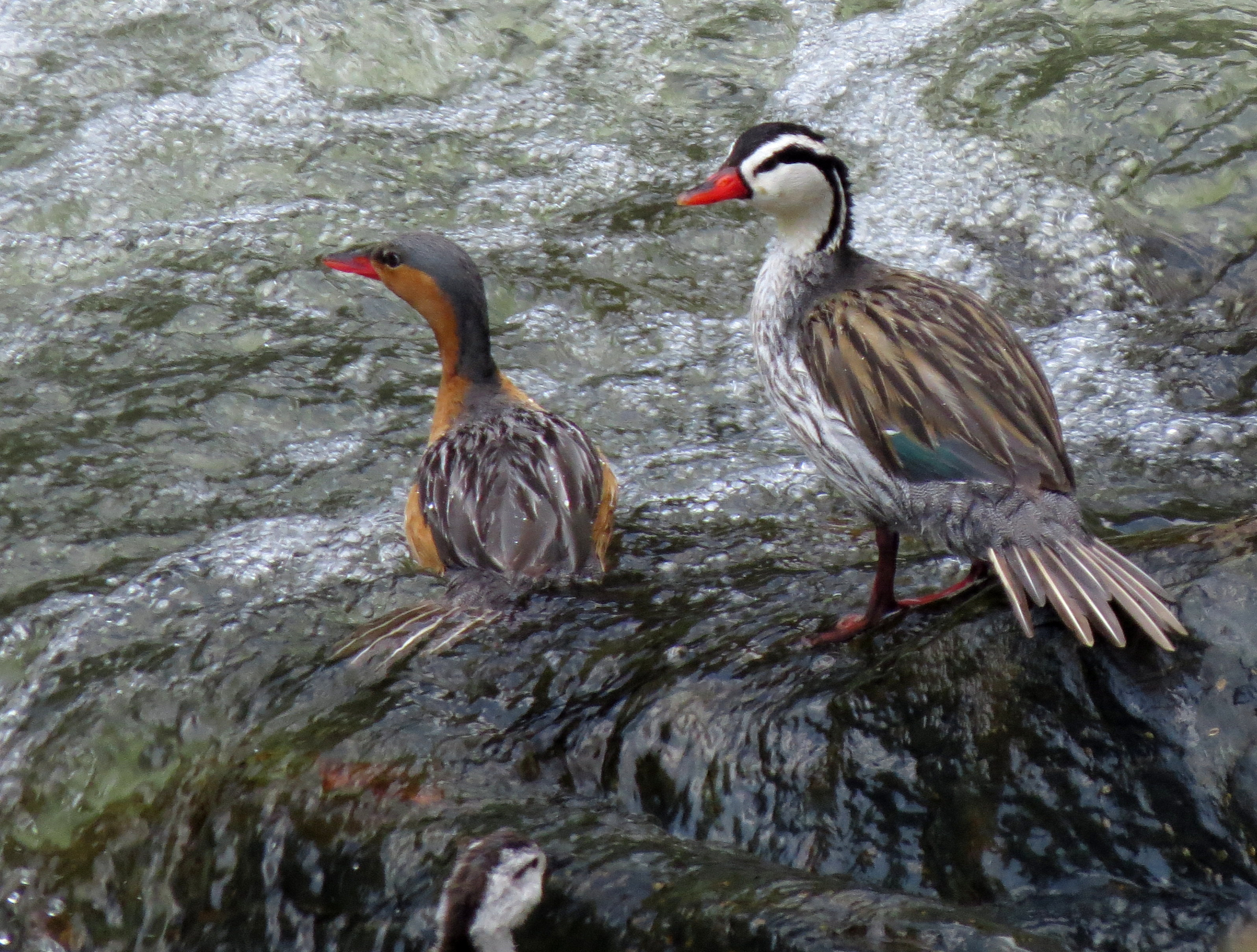
- Female (left) and male, Cañón del Río Anaime, Colombia

Conservation status
- Least Concern (IUCN 3.1)

Scientific classification
- Kingdom: Animalia
- Phylum: Chordata
- Class: Aves
- Order: Anseriformes
- Family: Anatidae
- Genus: Merganetta; Gould, 1842
- Species: M. armata

Binomial name
- Merganetta armata Gould, 1842

Subspecies
- M. a. colombiana (Des Murs, 1845); Colombian torrent duck M. a. leucogenis (Tschudi, 1843); Peruvian torrent duck M. a. armata (Gould, 1842); Chilean torrent duck M. a. berlepschi (Hartert, 1909) (disputed); M. a. garleppi (Berlepsch, 1894) (disputed); M. a. turneri (Sclater & Salvin, 1869) (disputed)

= Torrent duck =

Species of Andean bird

The torrent duck (Merganetta armata) is a member of the duck, goose and swan family Anatidae. It is the only member of the genus Merganetta. It is placed in the shelduck subfamily Tadorninae after the "perching duck" assemblage to which it was formerly assigned was dissolved because it turned out to be paraphyletic.

This 43–46-centimetre (17–18 in) long species is a resident breeder in the Andes of South America, nesting in small waterside caves and other sheltered spots. Like the blue duck, it holds territories on fast-flowing mountain rivers, usually above 1,500 metres (4,900 ft). It is a powerful swimmer and diver even in white water but is reluctant to fly more than short distances. It is not particularly wary when located.

Male torrent ducks have a striking black and white head and neck pattern and a red bill. In-flight, they show dark wings with green speculum. Females of all subspecies are smaller than the drakes; they have orange underparts and throat, with the head and upperparts grey and a yellower bill. Juveniles are pale grey above and whitish below.

The male's call is a shrill whistle, while the female's is a throatier whistle.

This is a declining species due to competition for its invertebrate food from introduced trout, pollution, forest destruction, and damming of mountain rivers for hydroelectric schemes. The Chilean population seems relatively stable, while the more northern ones are more seriously affected. However, the overall population is still large enough to warrant classification as a Species of Least Concern in the IUCN Redlist.

== Subspecies ==
The subspecies taxonomy can be confusing. Males of the southern nominate subspecies M. a. armata, the Chilean torrent duck, have grey back and blackish underparts, with a chestnut belly. Males of the slightly smaller northern subspecies, the Colombian torrent duck, M. a. colombiana, are paler underneath, with streaked grey-brown underparts. Males of a third subspecies, the Peruvian torrent duck, M. a. leucogenis, are intermediate but very variable in plumage; some have entirely black underparts (turneri morph). Only males of the Chilean torrent duck have a black 'teardrop' mark beneath the eye. The Peruvian torrent duck is sometimes split into 4 subspecies (leucogenis, turneri, garleppi and berlepschi), but these are more likely simply color variations, as they are not limited to distinct areas.

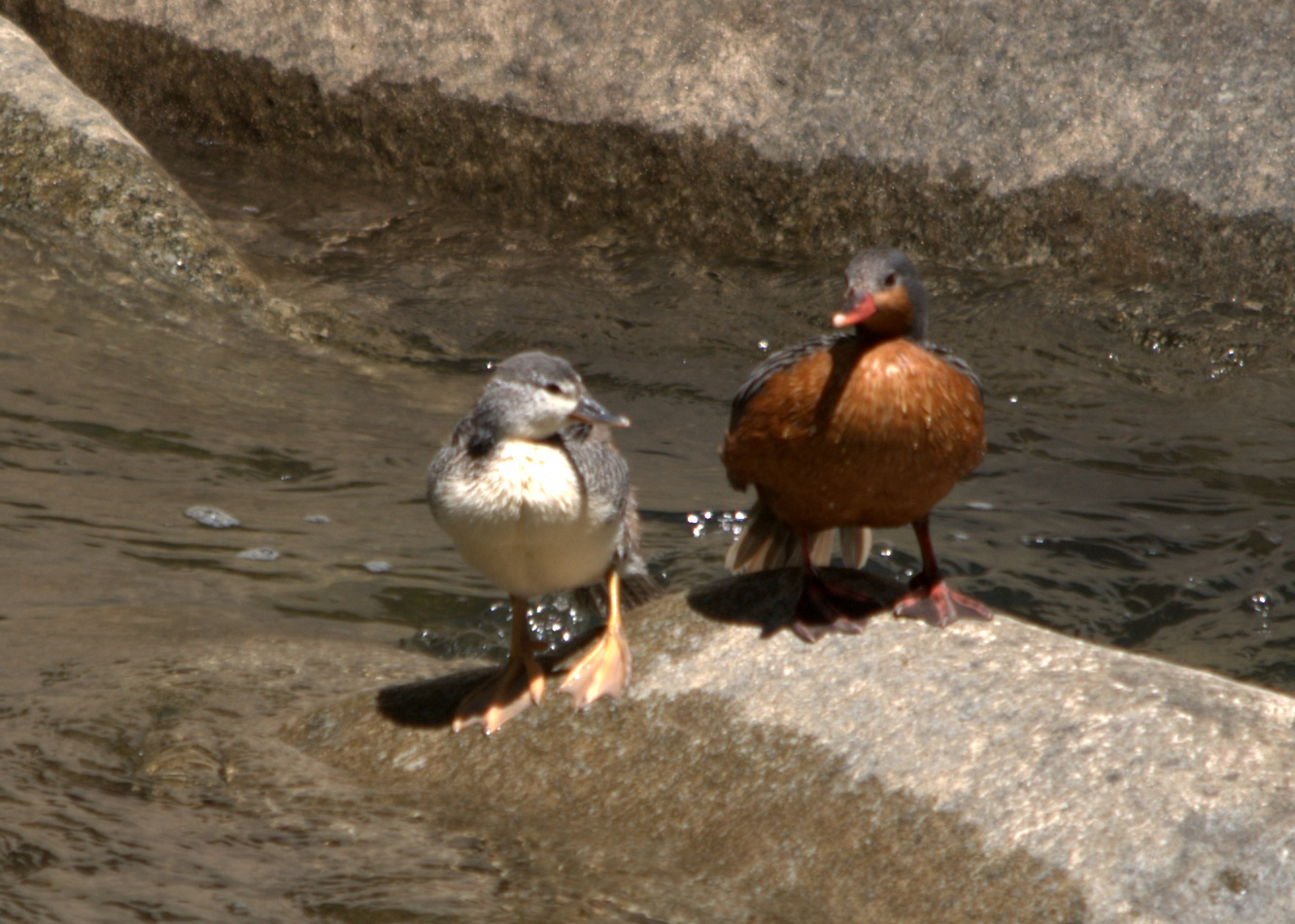
Juvenile (left) and female Peruvian torrent duck on the Urubamba River, Peru

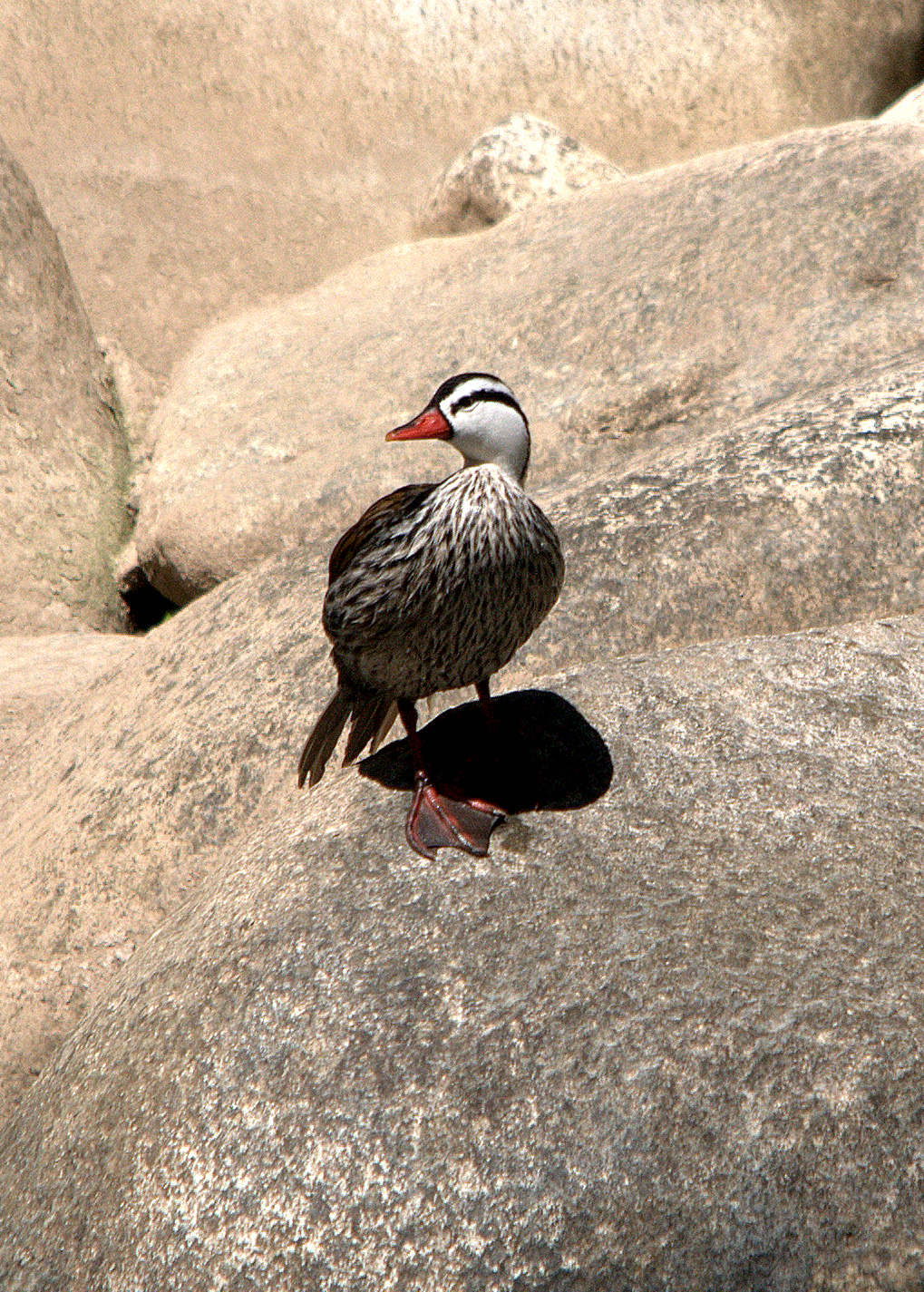
Male Peruvian torrent duck on the rocky banks of the Urubamba River, Peru

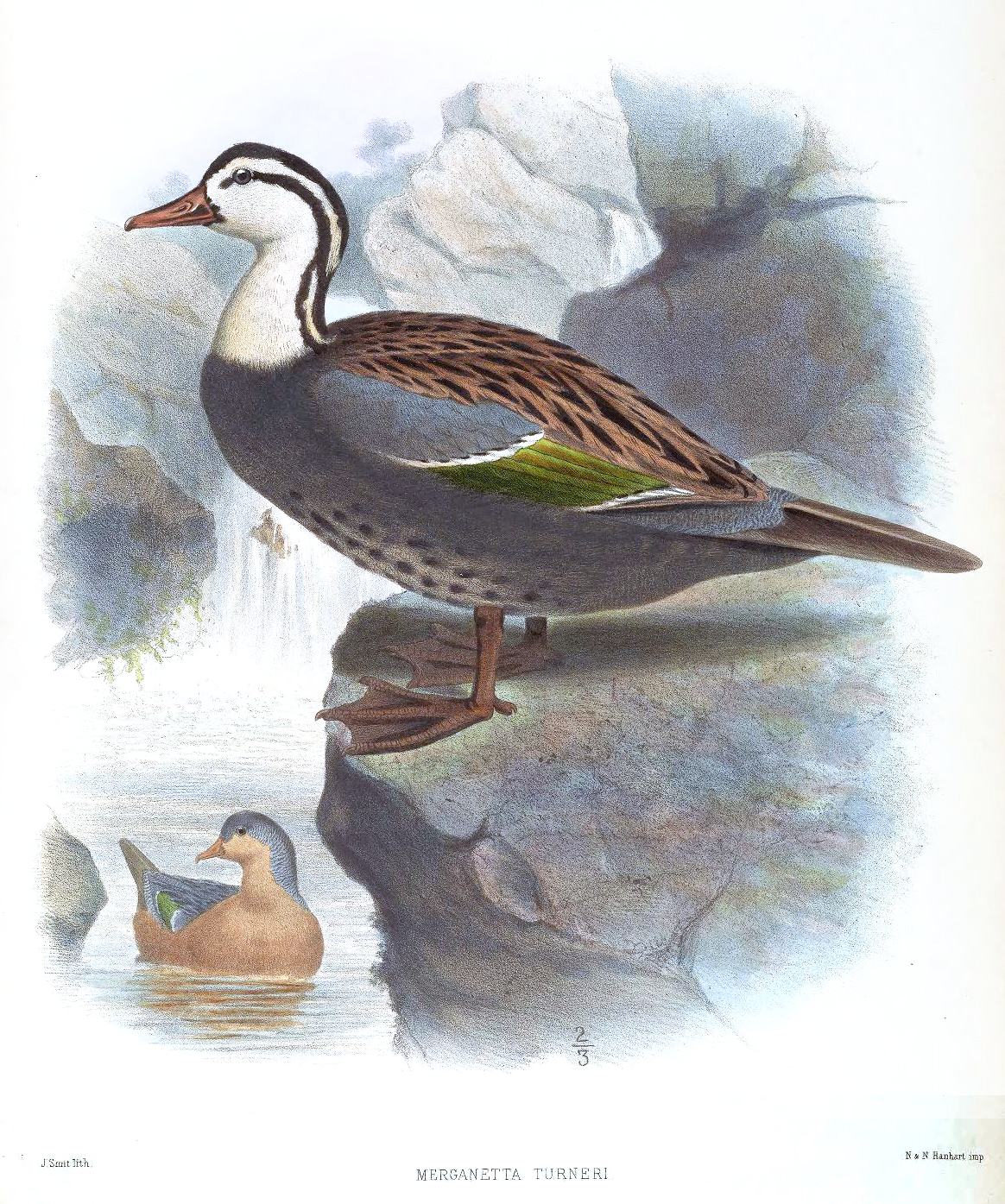
Male (top) and female Peruvian torrent duck, turneri morph

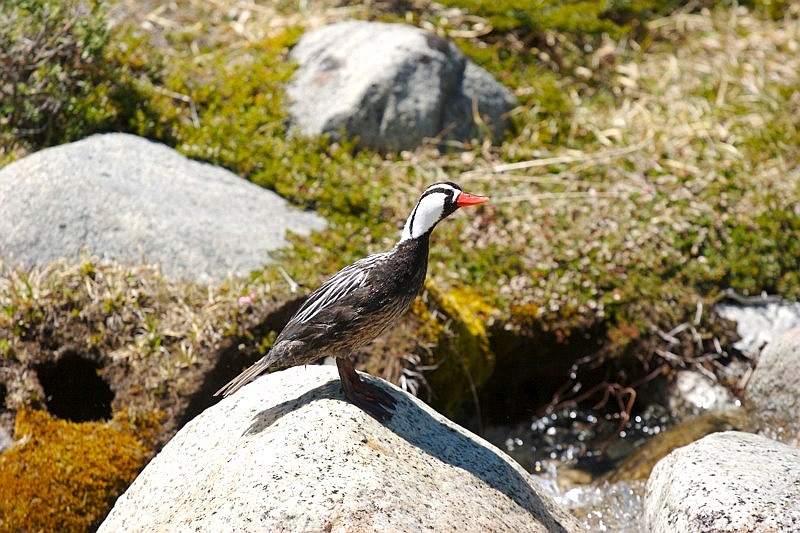
Male Chilean torrent duck near Fitz Roy, Argentina

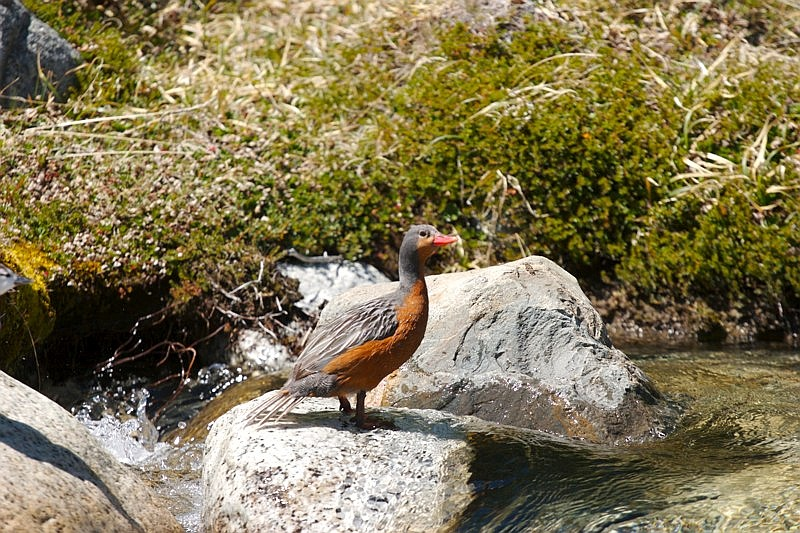
Female Chilean torrent duck near Fitz Roy, Argentina
