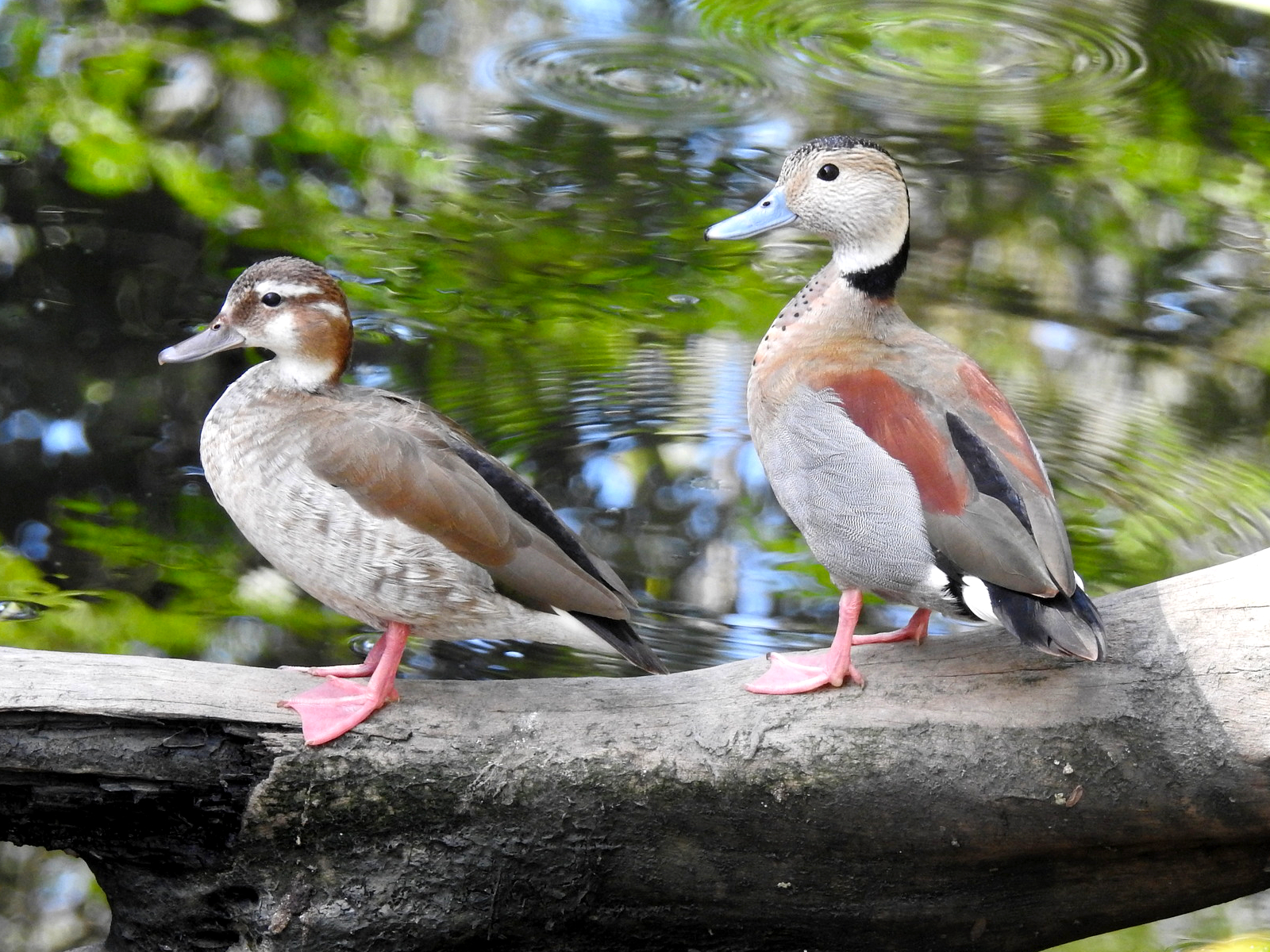
- Female (left) and male, Ingeniero Maschwitz, Buenos Aires, Argentina

Conservation status
- Least Concern (IUCN 3.1)

Scientific classification
- Kingdom: Animalia
- Phylum: Chordata
- Class: Aves
- Order: Anseriformes
- Family: Anatidae
- Genus: Callonetta; Delacour, 1936
- Species: C. leucophrys

Binomial name
- Callonetta leucophrys (Vieillot, 1816)

= Ringed teal =

Species of duck

The ringed teal (Callonetta leucophrys) is a small duck of marshes, pools, and forest wetlands native to south-central South America. It is the only species of the genus Callonetta. Formerly often placed with the perching ducks in the tribe Cairinini, this species is now known to be closer to shelducks and belongs in the subfamily Tadorninae.

== Description ==
The ringed teal is 35–38 cm (14–15 in) long, with a 70 cm (28 in) wingspan, and a weight of 190–360 g (6.7–12.7 oz). The drake has a rich chestnut back, pale grey flanks, and a salmon-coloured breast speckled in black. A black band runs from the top of its head down to the nape.

Females have an olive-brownish back, a head blotched and striated in white, and pencilled barring on a pale chest and belly. Both males and females have a dark tail, a contrasting pale rump, and a distinctive white patch on the wing. The bill is grey and legs and feet are pink in both sexes. Pairs easily bond.

Their contact calls are a cat-like mee-oowing in ducks and a lingering peewoo in drakes. The male and female retain similar plumage throughout the year, lacking an eclipse plumage. Ringed teals also have webbed toes with long, pointed claws that allow the birds to sit on tree branches.

== Breeding habits ==
The ringed teal breeds in northern Argentina, southern and central Bolivia, southern Brazil, Paraguay, and Uruguay; it is resident or disperses short distances after the breeding season. Upon reaching sexual maturity, ringed teals form strong pair bonds. These pair bonds typically last a single breeding season but can last for the lifetime of a pair. A pair bond begins with the male courting the female. In general, courting consists of large amounts of preening, flashing the iridescent green speculum, and swimming in figure eights around the female of interest while calling.

Once a pair bond is solidified, mating occurs in the water. The nests are usually in tree cavities, but they will also breed in the large stick nests built by monk parakeets. The nests are lined with down, and the female tends to be the defender of the nest. The male will defend the female against other males and potential predators throughout their pair bond.

Females typically lay 6-12 eggs, which are white. The eggs are incubated for an average of 26–28 days. Both male and female participate incubating the eggs, but one captive study shows that the females were solely responsible for incubation.

=== Chicks ===
Hatched chicks are precocial, having a layer of down and effectively walking, functioning, and feeding themselves. Although the chicks hatch with a layer of feather down, it is not immediately waterproof. Until their own oil glands are fully developed, chicks receive their waterproofing oils from contact with their parents' feathers. Both the male and female play a large role in raising and defending the chicks until fledging at 50–55 days old. The male tends to be the most invested and will often be seen following behind separated or slower chicks.

Until fledging, the chicks stay in a close group and learn quickly from their parents how to forage, swim efficiently, and avoid predators. The bonded pair is often able to produce two groups of offspring in one breeding season. The male will continue to care for the first group of chicks while the female incubates the second group of eggs. The ringed teal's pair bonding behaviour makes reproduction very efficient. It is possible for a bonded pair to have laid and hatched up to 24 offspring by the end of a breeding season.

== Habitat ==
Their habitats include tropical, swampy forests and marshy clearings in well-wooded lowlands, as well as secluded pools and small streams. As a predominantly aquatic species, ringed teals eat a variety of aquatic plants and invertebrates, as well as any seeds that can be found. Ringed teals are classified as "dabblers" as opposed to "divers".

Dabblers tend to feed on plant and insect material near the surface of the water, whereas divers feed on plants, invertebrates, and fish deeper under the water's surface. Although dabblers may submerge their heads and upper torso while putting their tails up in the air, also known as "up-ending", they rarely completely submerge themselves and stay under for periods of time, such as the diving ducks do.

== Lifespan ==
Ringed teals can live up to 15 years in captivity. The average life span for wild individuals is not known.

== Gallery ==
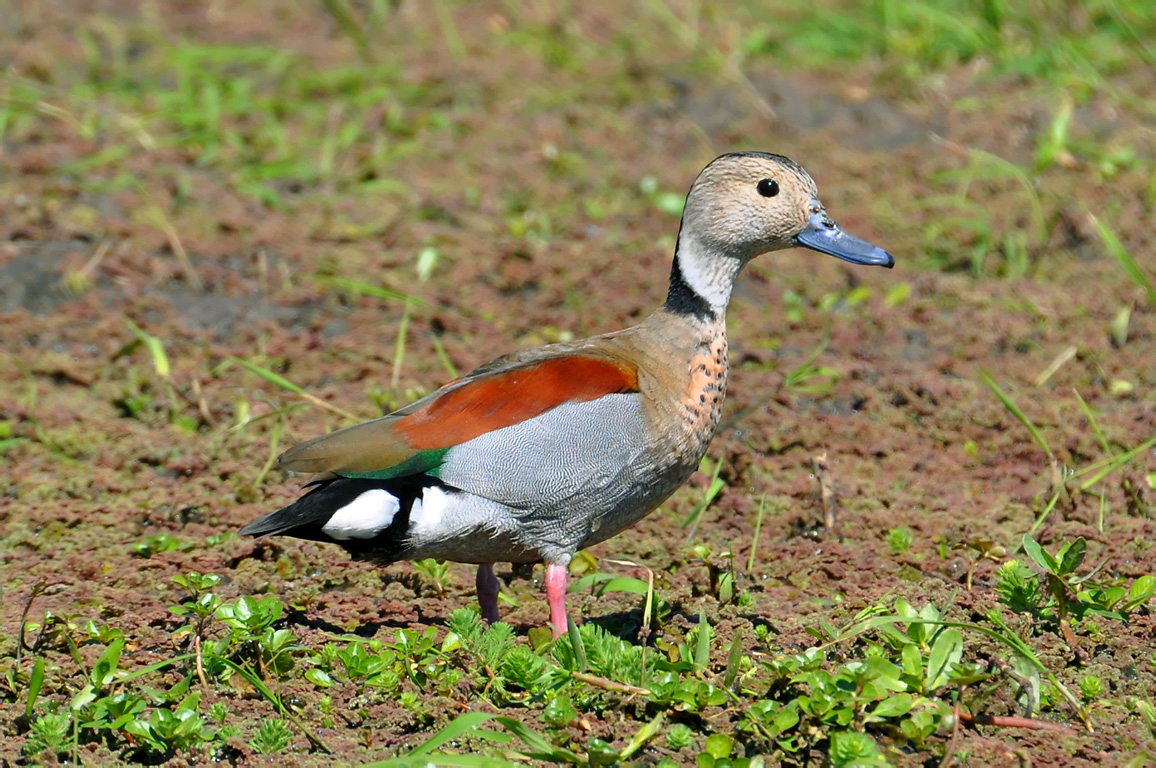
Male, Rio Grande do Sul, Brazil

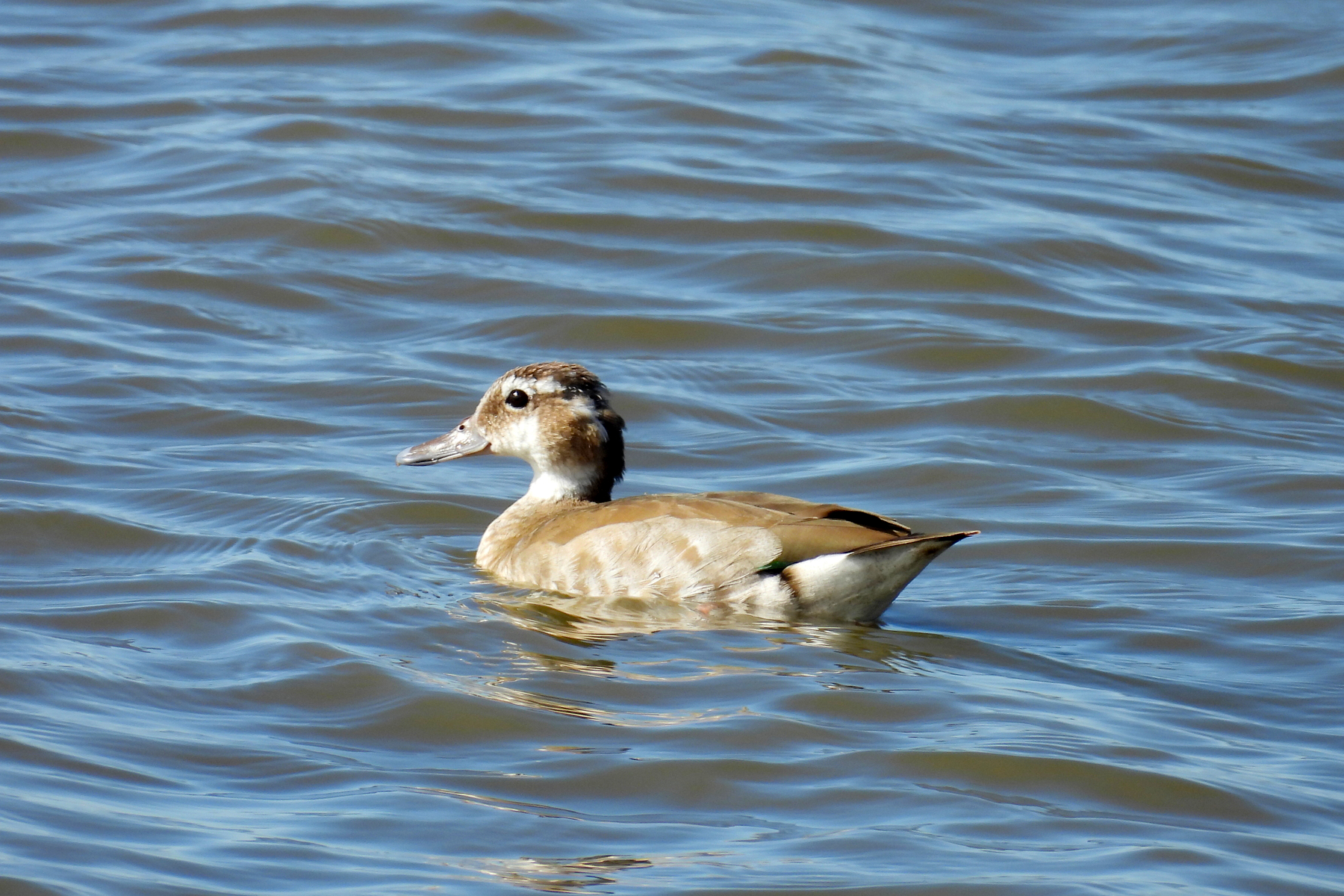
Female, La Pampa, Argentina

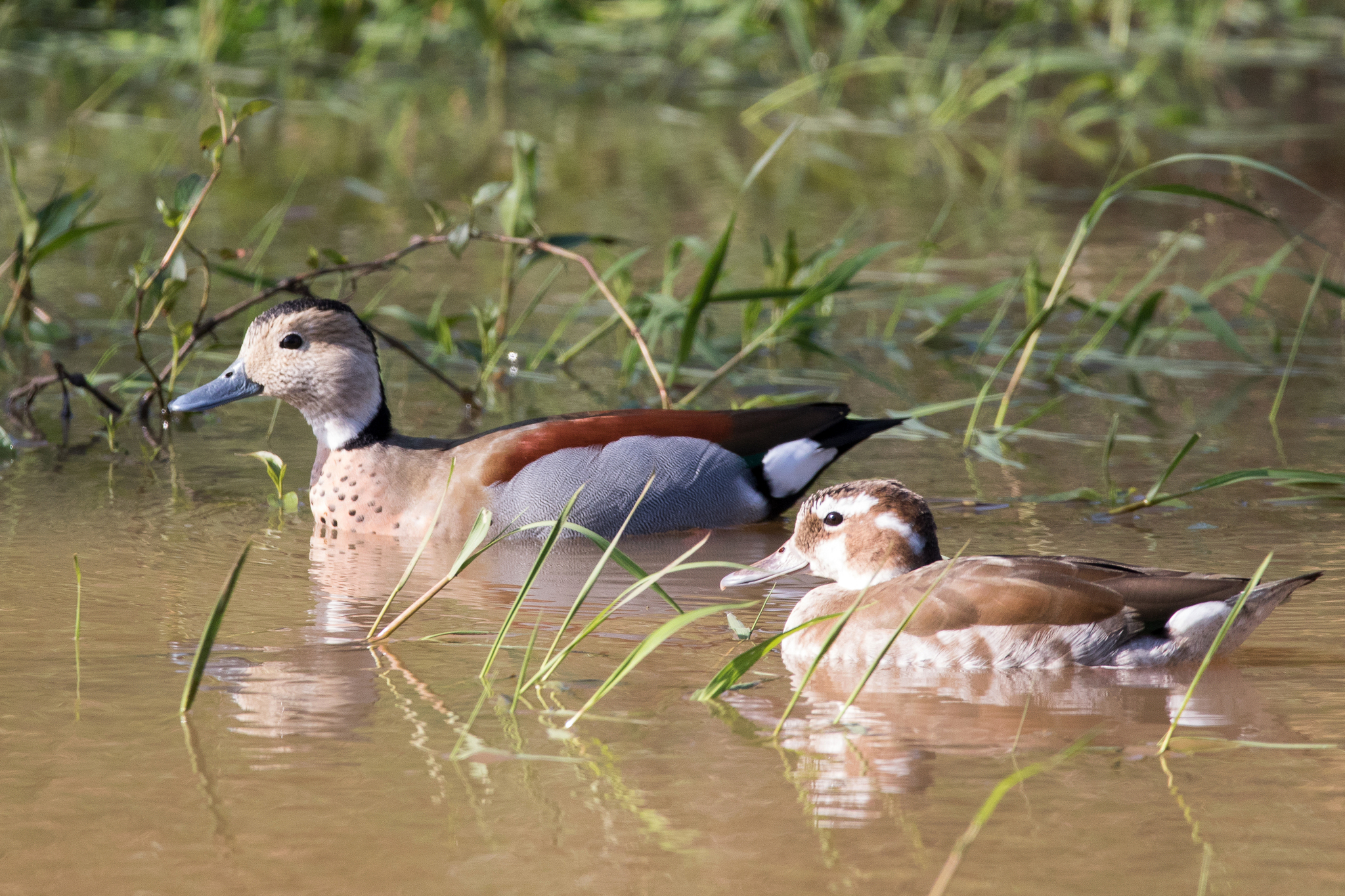
Pair in Rio Grande do Sul, Brazil

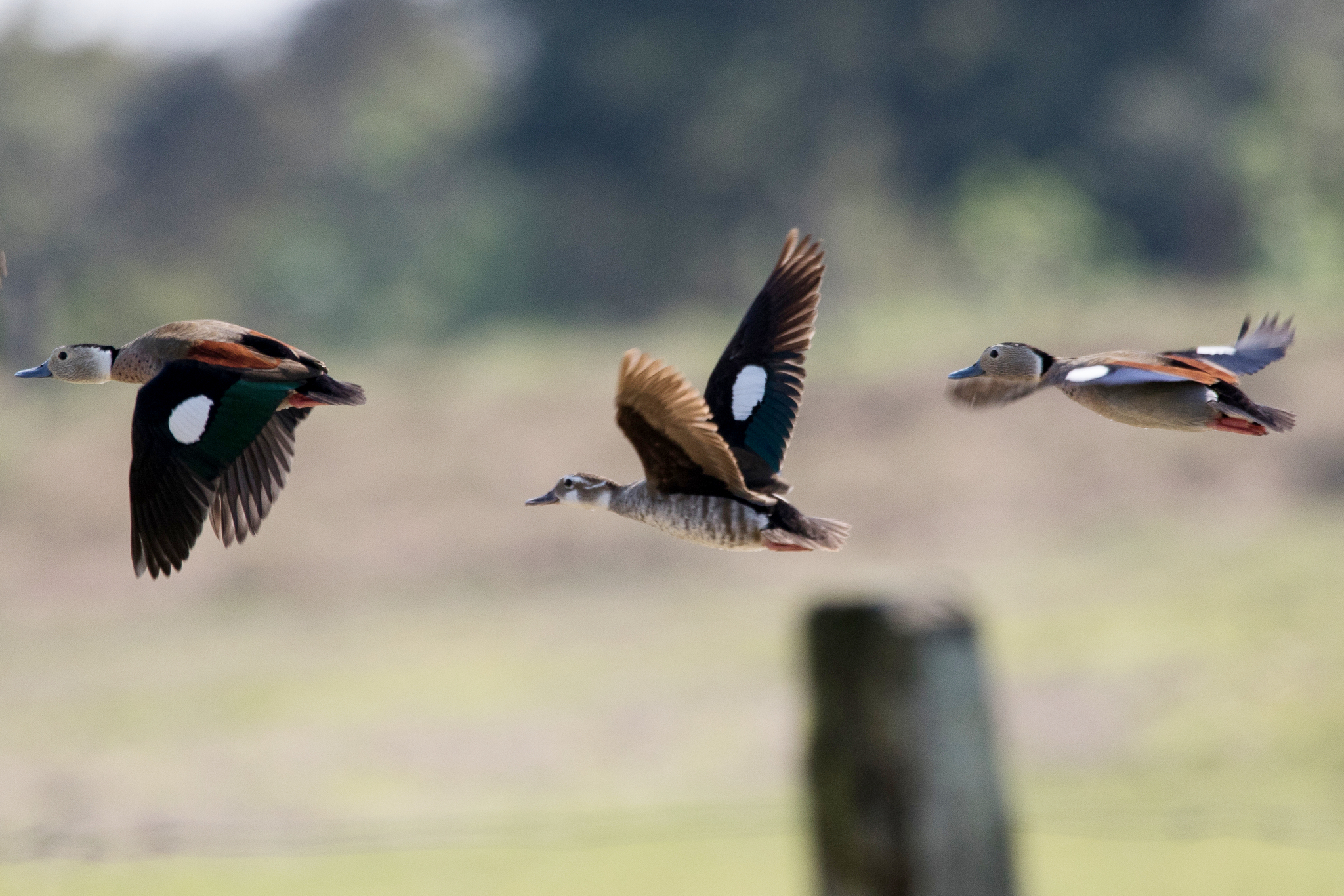
In flight, showing the white wing patch; Rio Grande do Sul, Brazil

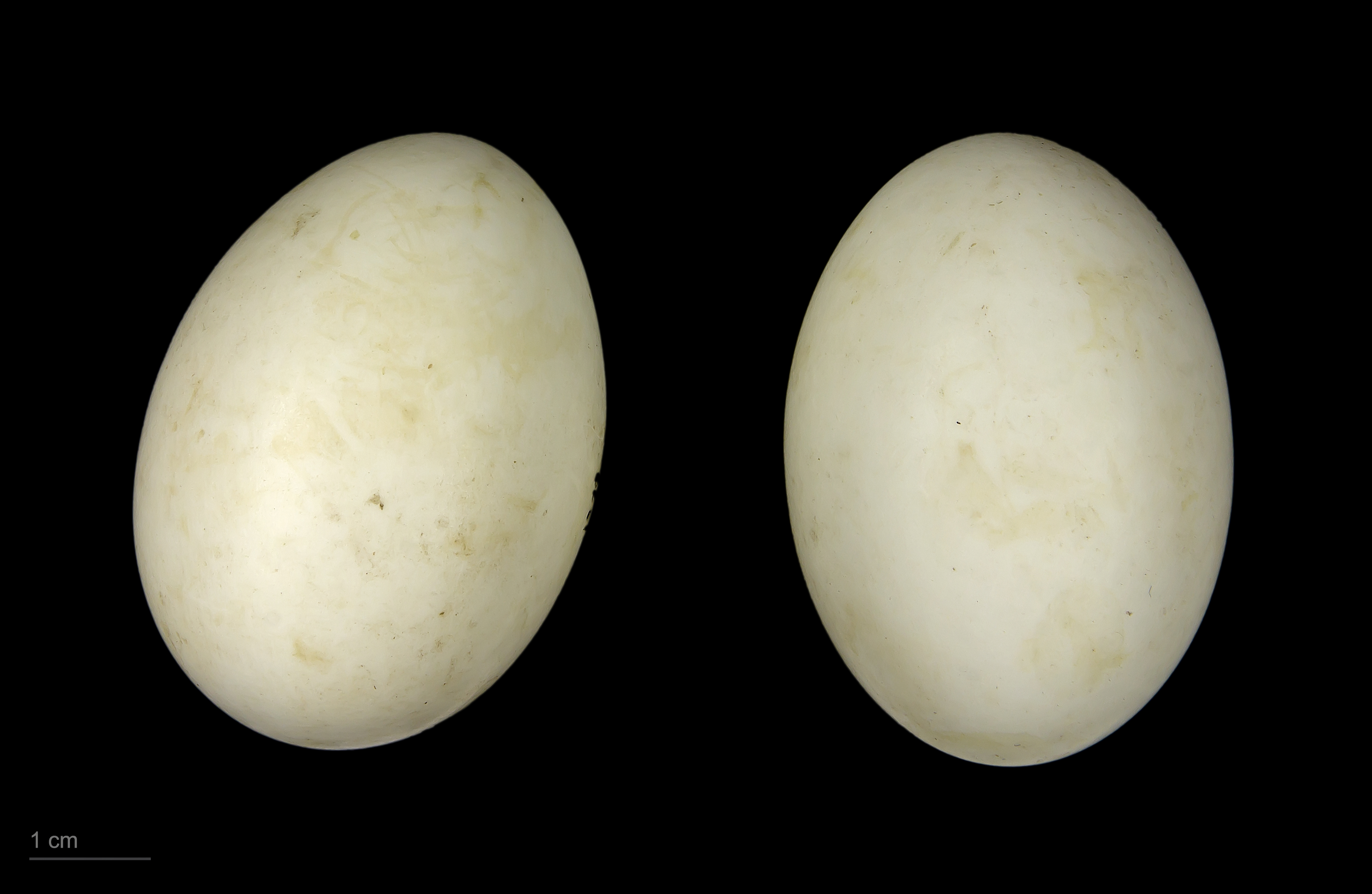
Eggs (Muséum de Toulouse)
