= Cotton pygmy goose =

Conservation status
- Least Concern (IUCN 3.1)

Scientific classification
- Kingdom: Animalia
- Phylum: Chordata
- Class: Aves
- Order: Anseriformes
- Family: Anatidae
- Genus: Nettapus
- Species: N. coromandelianus

Binomial name
- Nettapus coromandelianus (Gmelin, JF, 1789)

Subspecies
- N. c. coromandelianus; N. c. albipennis Gould, 1842
- Range Cotton pygmy goose (N. c. coromandelianus) Cotton pygmy goose (N. c. albipennis) African pygmy goose Green pygmy goose

Species of bird

The cotton pygmy goose or cotton teal (Nettapus coromandelianus) is a small perching duck which breeds in South and Southeast Asia extending to Queensland in Australia where they are sometimes called white-quilled pygmy goose. They are among the smallest waterfowl in the world and are found in small to large waterbodies with good aquatic vegetation. They are usually seen in pairs or larger groups of pairs, roosting and nesting on trees near water. They are strong fliers and are known to disperse widely, especially in winter. Their breeding season coincides with the rains.

== Taxonomy ==
The cotton pygmy goose was formally described in 1789 by the German naturalist Johann Friedrich Gmelin in his revised and expanded edition of Carl Linnaeus's Systema Naturae. He placed it with the ducks, swans and geese in the genus Anas and coined the binomial name Anas coromandeliana. Gmelin based his description on "La Sarcelle de Coromandel" that had been described in 1783 by the French polymath Georges-Louis Leclerc, Comte de Buffon in his Histoire Naturelle des Oiseaux. Hand-coloured plates had been published separately. The cotton pygmy goose is now one of three species placed in the genus Nettapus that was introduced in 1836 by the German naturalist Johann Friedrich von Brandt. The genus name is from Ancient Greek nētta meaning "duck" and pous meaning "foot". Members of the genus are sexually dimorphic, with the cotton pygmy goose the only species in which there is a marked difference in the non-breeding plumage of the males.

Two subspecies are recognized. The nominate form is found in India, Asia extending east to New Guinea. The population in eastern Australia is placed in the subspecies albipennis (first described by John Gould in 1842). It is marginally larger in dimensions.

== Description ==
Small individuals of this species are the smallest waterfowl on earth, at as little as 160 g (5.6 oz) and 26 cm (10 in). The goose-like bill is short and deep at the base. Males have a dark brown forehead and crown and a blackish green broad collar at the base of the neck. The sides of the head and neck are whitish. The back, wing coverts and scapulars are dark brown with green and purple gloss. The female has a duller cap and a brown line through the eye. The collar is replaced by spots and the face is flecked and neck finely vermiculated unlike the male. The non-breeding or eclipse male resembles the female except that it has the broader white wing band. In flight the male has dark wings with white flight feathers tipped in black. The female has dark wings and a white trailing edge to the secondaries and a few inner primaries. They have a red iris and black legs (greenish in breeding males) and bill. The hind toe is narrowly lobed. The nostril is small and oval and opens close to the base of the commissure of the bill.

Downy chicks have white superciliary stripes that meet at the back of the head which is black. A short dark eye stripe is present on the whitish face. The upperside of the neck is grey. The mantle is grey brown and two white patches are present on the scapulars. The tail is dark grey to black. The underside is buff.

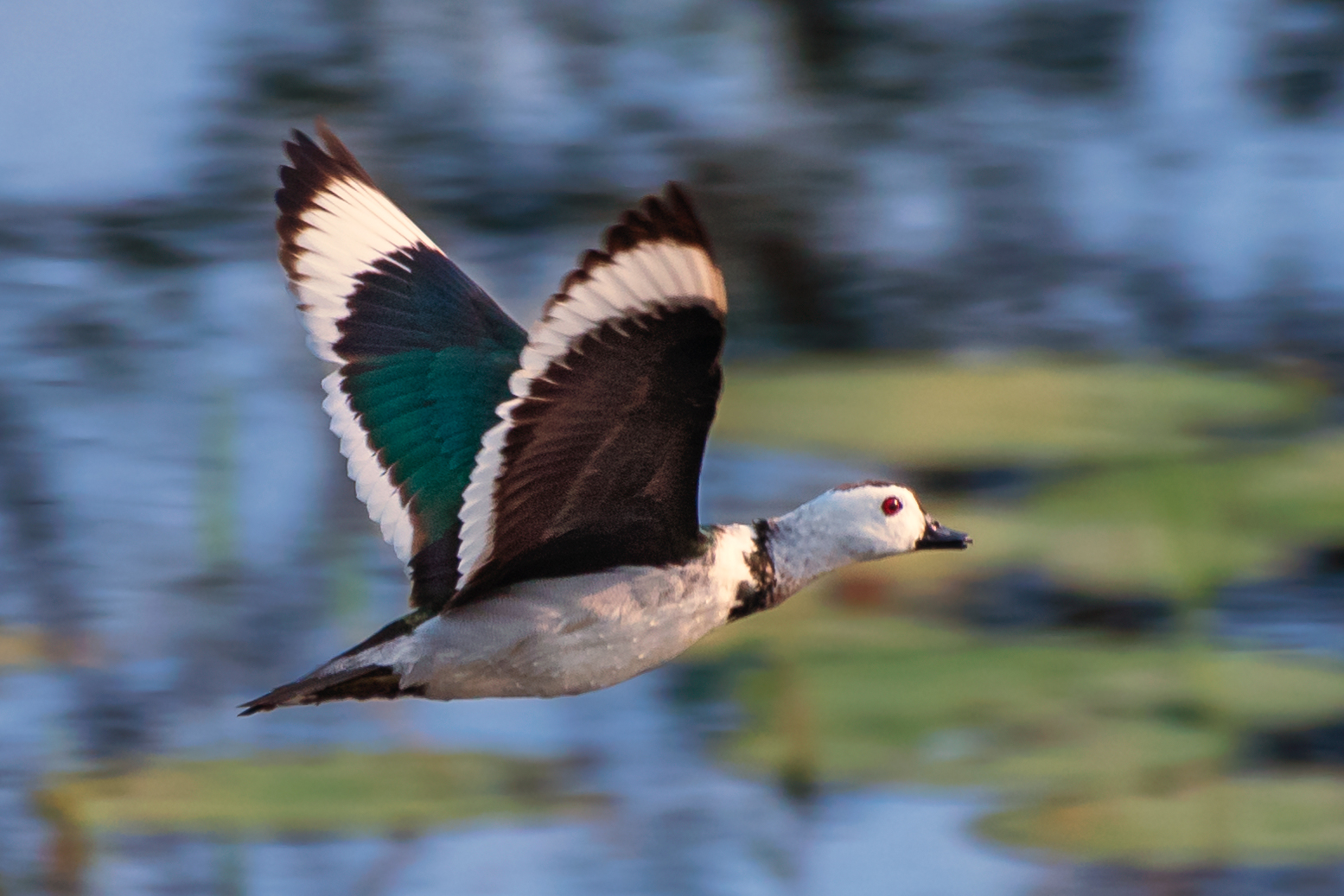
Male in flight, the white band on the dark wing is broad. The green gloss on the upper wing coverts is distinctive.

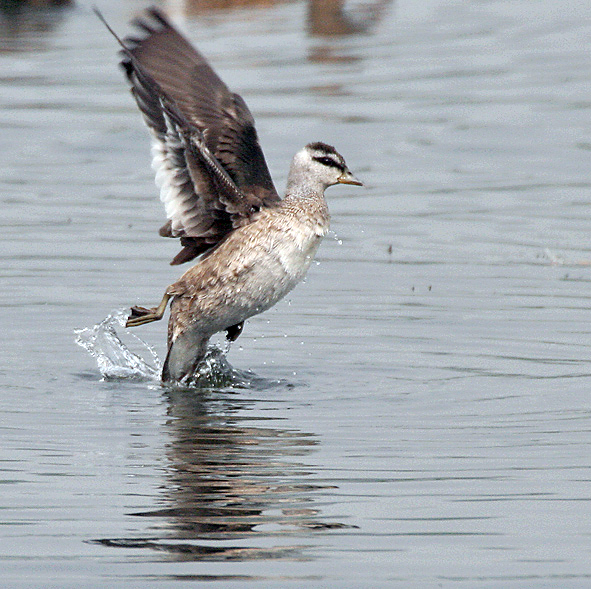
Female in flight, the white trailing edge is restricted mainly to the secondaries

== Distribution and habitat ==
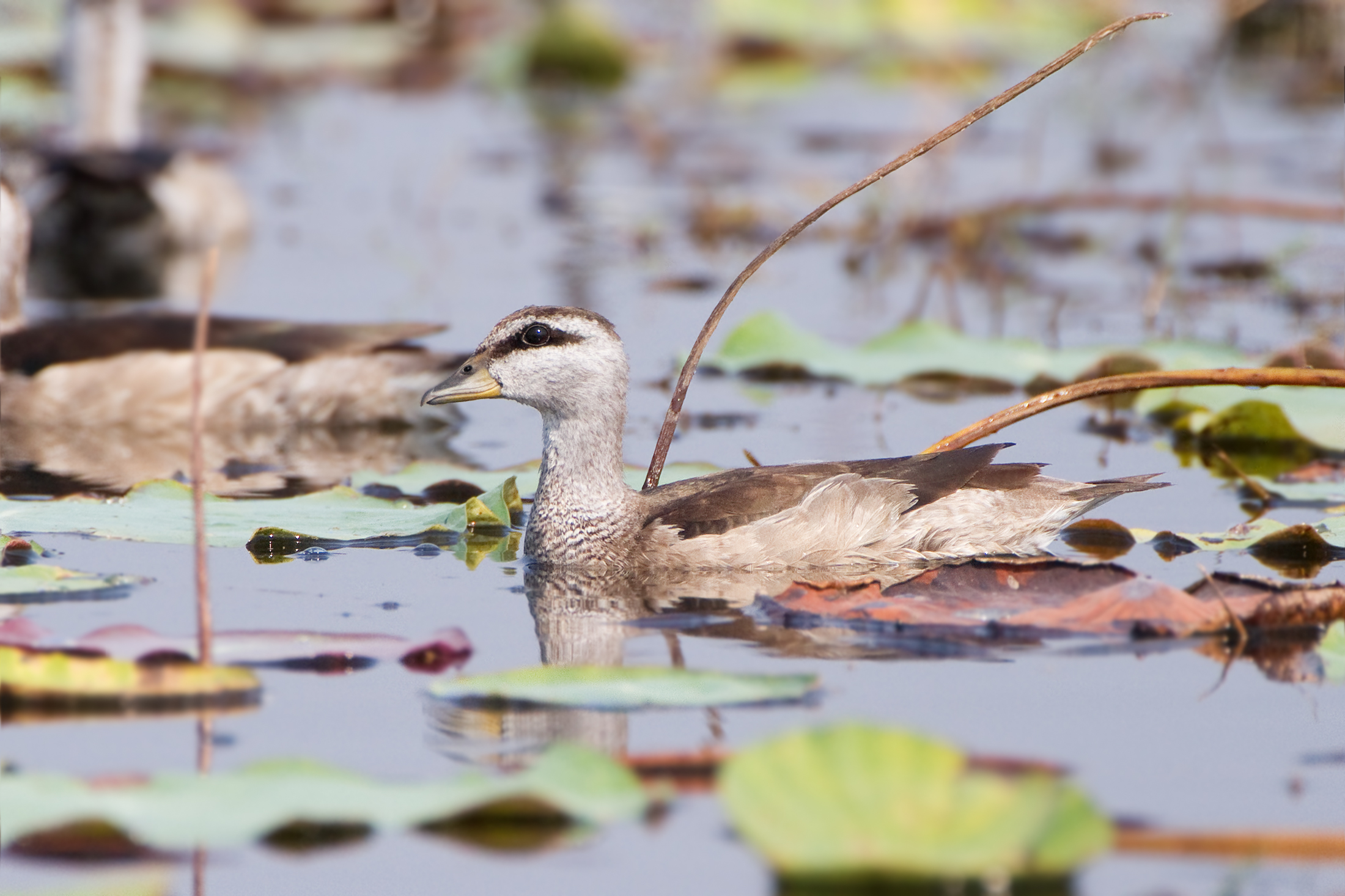
Female with dark eye-stripe, nominate population (Thailand)

This species is widely distributed across tropical and subtropical Asia with the distribution extending to Australia. Although they are not considered to be long-distance migrants, many populations do travel significant distances in response to rain and water availability. Some populations disperse further in summer and are found only seasonally, for instance in Afghanistan. Winter dispersal is also wide and individuals have been seen as far west as Arabia, and Jordan and they are regularly found on islands in the region such as the Maldives and the Andamans. Across their range, they are mainy found in lakes, ponds and shallow waterbodies with ample emergent or floating vegetation amid which they forage. Habitats dominated by flora like Nymphaea, Nymphoides, Nelumbo nucifera, Ipomoea aquatica and various aquatic sedges are often preferred. Occasionally, they can also be found in smaller irrigation ponds around villages and flooded paddies in South Asia. In Australia they are found mainly in lagoons. They are said to roost on trees.

== Behaviour and ecology ==
Several pairs of the bird may forage in close proximity on a single waterbody. Large flocks form in winter and a flock of nearly 6000 was recorded at Chilka lake. This species feeds mainly at the surface of the water. Stomach analysis showed that they fed on small fishes Puntius, Mystus, Oryzias, molluscs, crustaceans, insect larvae as well as plant matter from species such as Ipomoea, Hydrilla and Ruppia. They do not dive or up-end and take to flight from the water surface without having to run or patter on the surface. They fly swiftly, often low over water, and are agile enough to escape falcons.

=== Breeding ===
Courtship displays are largely undocumented but a post-copulatory display involves the male arching neck, displaying the white neck feathers and the white wing patches. They pair up during the breeding season which is mainly during the rains (monsoons in June–August India and January to March in Australia) and build their nests mainly in natural tree hollows, such as tree trunks. The males assist in locating nests but incubation is thought to be by the female alone which lays 6 to 12 ivory-colored eggs per clutch. The nest may as high as five metres from the ground and chicks leap off to follow their parents into water. Larger clutches have been recorded and are thought to be due to intraspecific brood-parasitism.

== Predators and parasites ==
Rock pythons have been recorded preying on Cotton pygmy goose. Plasmodium circumflexum was found in their blood of a specimen examined in Bangladesh. Three species of parasitic cestode Hymenolepis smythi, H. fista and Retinometra fista are known from hosts of the species. The trematode Cyclocoelum sp. was recorded as a parasite in Queensland. Paramonostomum thapari was described from a cotton teal.

== In culture ==
They were hunted with shotguns especially in British India, although they were not considered particularly good eating. Eggs were collected for food and the birds were sold in large numbers in the birds markets of Calcutta in the 19th century. Fishermen in the Sunderbans set up twenty-foot high nets and drove birds on the water toward the nets before alarming them and getting them to fly into the nets. Injured birds were noted to submerge and hide themselves with only the head or bill out of water. In Burma, birds have been recorded nesting within buildings. Sir Harcourt Butler noted a nest at a height of 68 ft (21 m) under the eaves of the roof of the residence of the governor in Rangoon. Hume noted that the numbers of migratory ducks sold in the Calcutta markets declined over ten years but not those of the cotton teal. He also noted their tameness, dabbling about within ten yards of a village washerman noisily thrashing clothes.

The Sinhala name of mal saar or flower teal is based on the colours and possibly the habitat of lily-covered ponds. Many native names (such as lerreget-perreget) are onomatopoeic. The name "cotton teal" was used by Europeans near Bombay who noted that the bird had a lot of white feathers. They produce a low quacky call which has been likened to quacky duck, quacky duck or fixed bayonets (in British India). Samuel Tickell recorded a Kol name from Singhbum of Merom-derebet, merom being a goat and the call likened to a bleat.
