= Perching duck =

Colloquial term for ducks that perch in trees

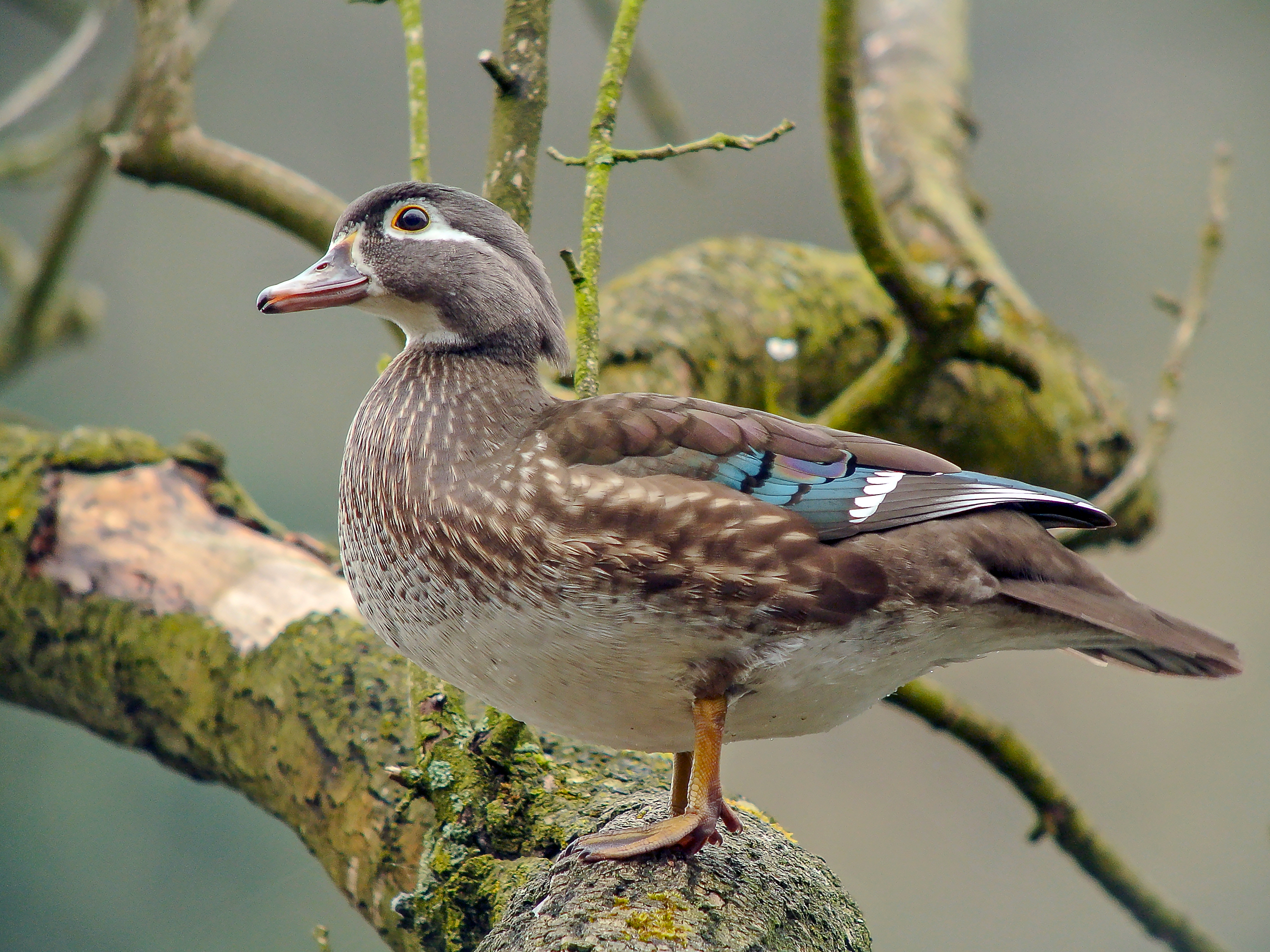
Perching female wood duck (Aix sponsa)

The term "perching ducks" is used colloquially to describe any species of ducks distinguished by their readiness to perch high in trees. Until the late 19th century, "perching ducks" referred to members of Cairinini, a tribe of ducks in the family Anatidae. The grouping has since been shown to be paraphyletic and is now rejected; their apparent similarities result from convergent evolution, with the different members more closely related to various other ducks than to each other. Some authors still adhere to the former taxonomy, retaining species like muscovy duck and wood duck within Cairinini.

Former members of the perching ducks have been suggested to be members, or close relatives, of other subfamilies. Species that were formerly in the Cairinini tribe (and their suggested current taxa) include:

- Spur-winged goose (Plectropterus gambensis): placed in its own subfamily, Plectropterinae
- Salvadori's teal (Salvadorina waigiuensis): contentious; placed by some in Anatini, others in Tadornini
- Blue duck (Hymenolaimus malacorhynchos): Tadornini
- Torrent duck (Merganetta armata): sometimes placed in its own tribe, Merganettini; by others in Tadornini
- Brazilian teal (Amazonetta brasiliensis): Anatini; perhaps Anatini – is particularly closely related to Tachyeres, Lophonetta, and Speculanas species.
- Knob-billed duck (Sarkidiornis melanotos) (Note: Most taxonomists split an additional species, the Comb duck (Sarkidiornis sylvicola) from S. melanotos. Presumably, S. sylvicola shares the clade(s) of its congener.): Anatini; between Anatini or Aythyini; sometimes placed in its own tribe, Sarkidiorini
- Pink-eared duck (Malacorhynchus membranaceus): basal sister to Oxyurinae; sometimes placed in Tandornini or, alternatively, a link between Anatinae and Aythyini
- Hartlaub's duck (Pteronetta hartlaubi): close relative of Aythyini
- Green pygmy goose (Nettapus pulchellus): Oxyurini
- Cotton pygmy goose (Nettapus coromandellanus): Oxyurini
- African pygmy goose (Nettapus auritus): Oxyurini
- Muscovy duck (Cairina moschata): Tadornini; (alternatively, between Mergini and Anatini)
- White-winged duck (Asarcornis scutulata): Aythyini
- Wood duck (Aix sponsa): Tadornini
- Mandarin duck (Aix galericulata): Tadornini
- Ringed teal (Callonetta leucophrys): between Aythyini and Mergini
- Maned duck (Chenonetta jubata): between Aythyini and Mergini; alternatively in Tadornini

Colloquially, certain species of whistling ducks, particularly the black-bellied whistling duck, may also be considered perching ducks, even though they have never been classified as part of the Cairinini.

== Gallery ==
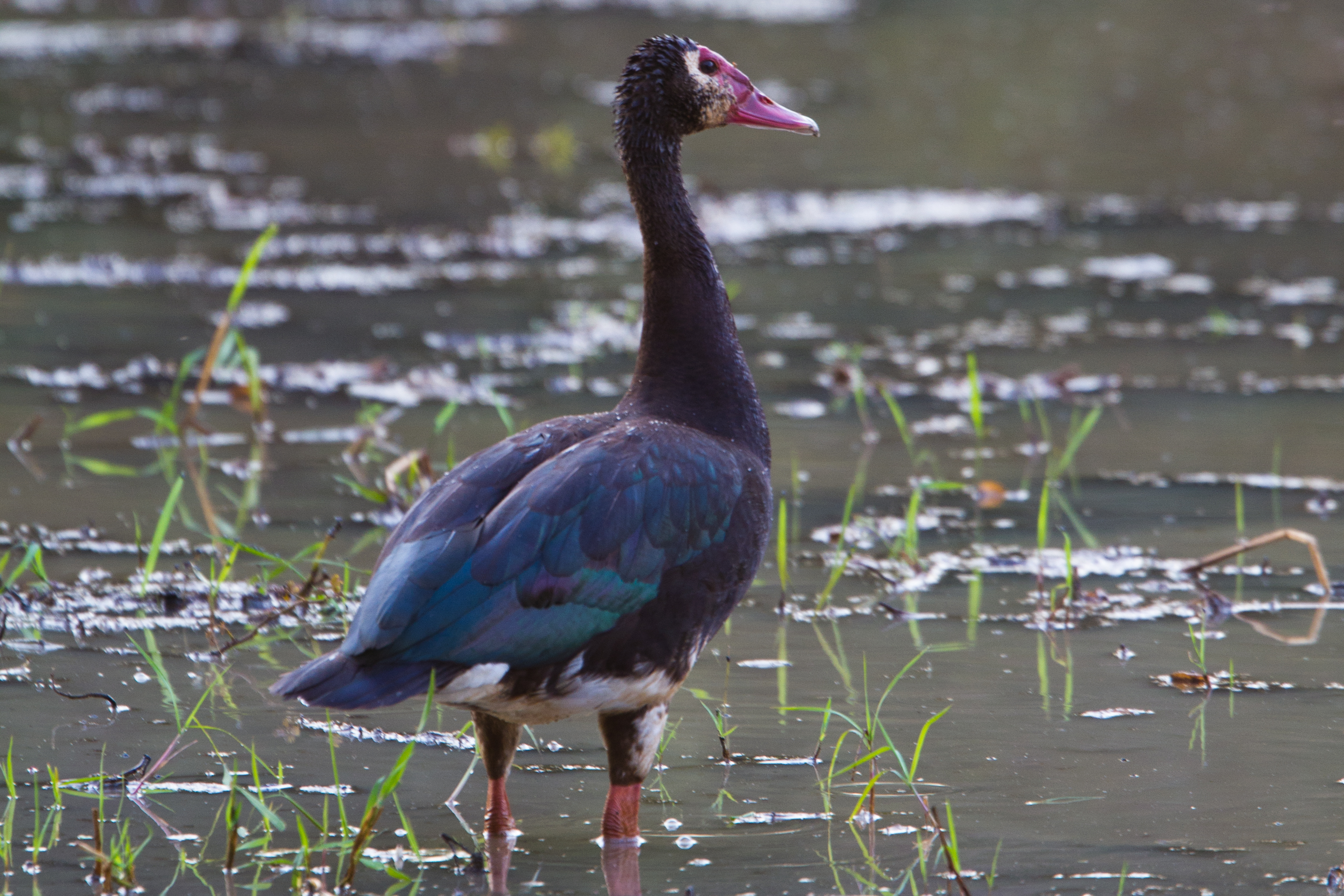
Spur-winged goose (Plectropterus gambensis)

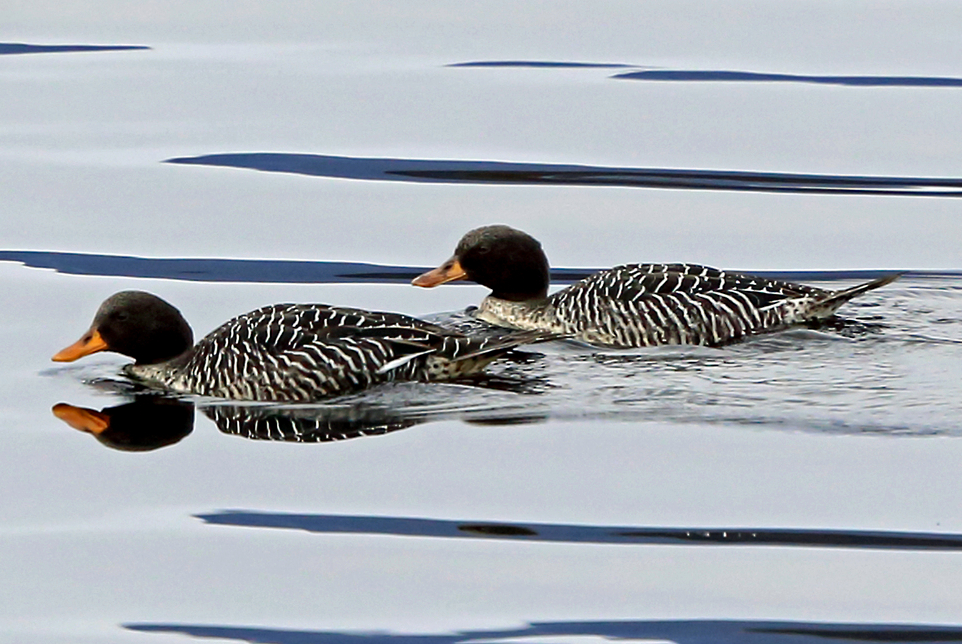
Salvadori's teal (Salvadorina waigiuensis)

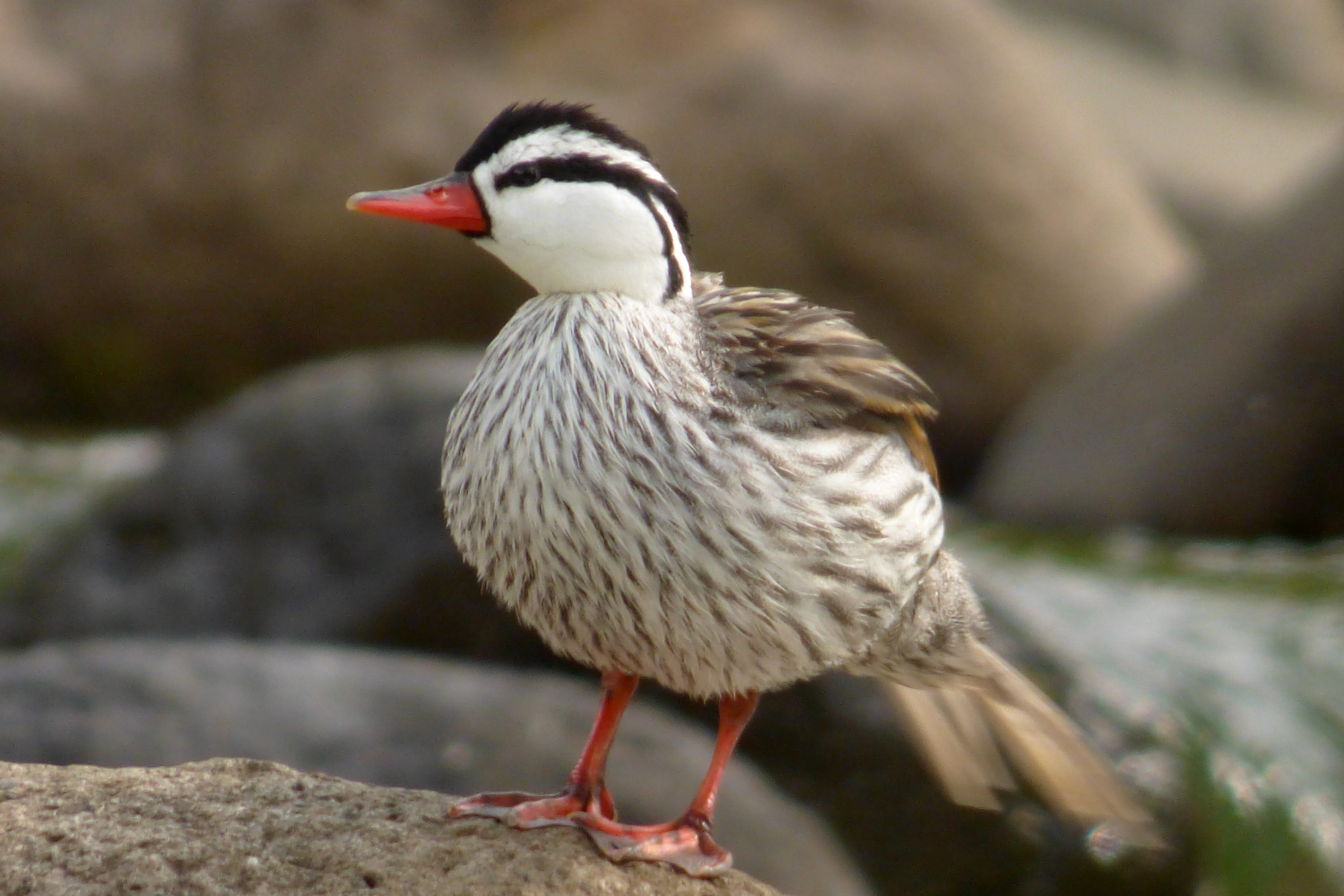
Torrent duck (Merganetta armata)

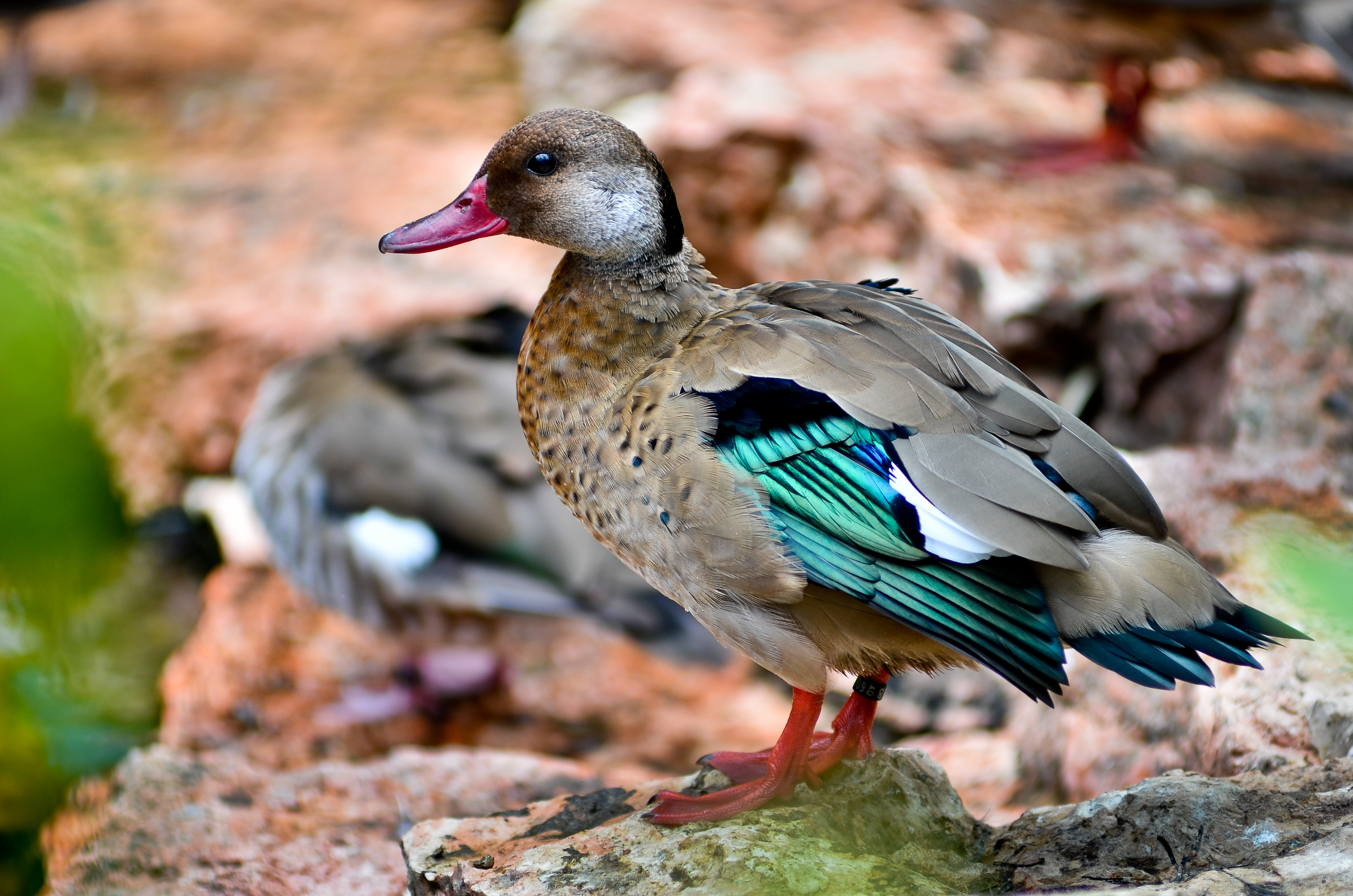
Brazilian teal (Amazonetta brasiliensis)

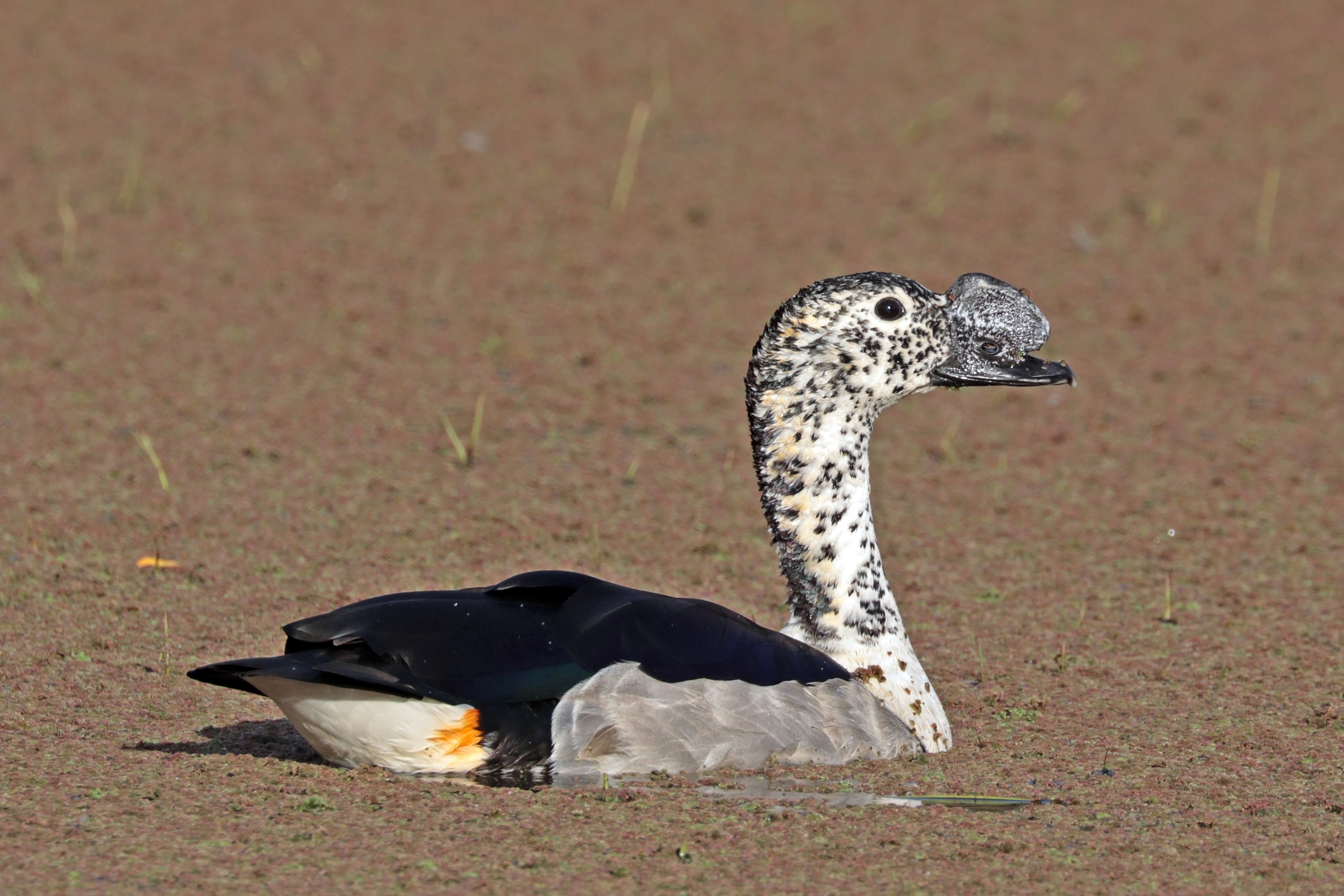
Knob-billed duck (Sarkidiornis melanotos)

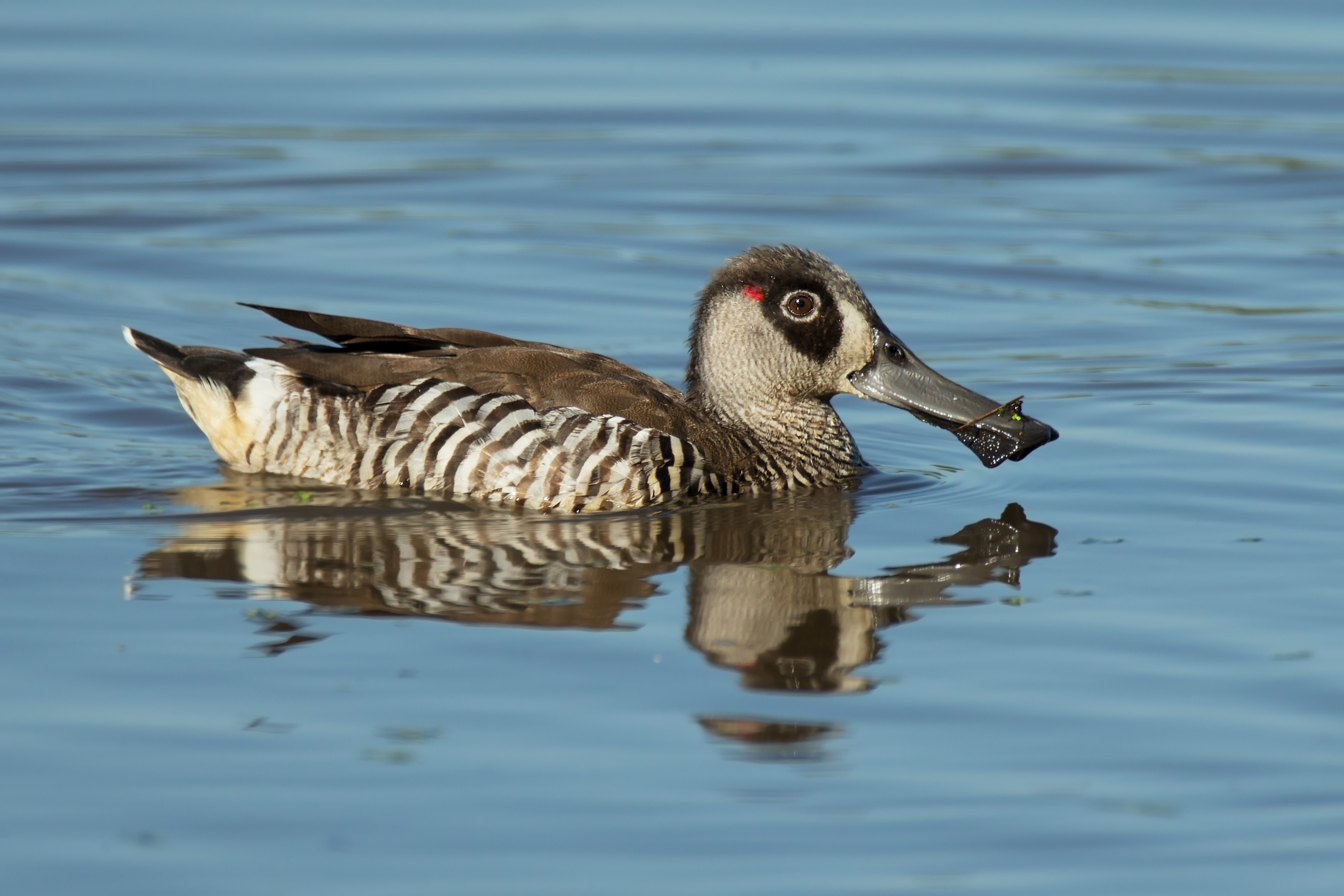
Pink-eared duck (Malacorhynchus membranaceus)

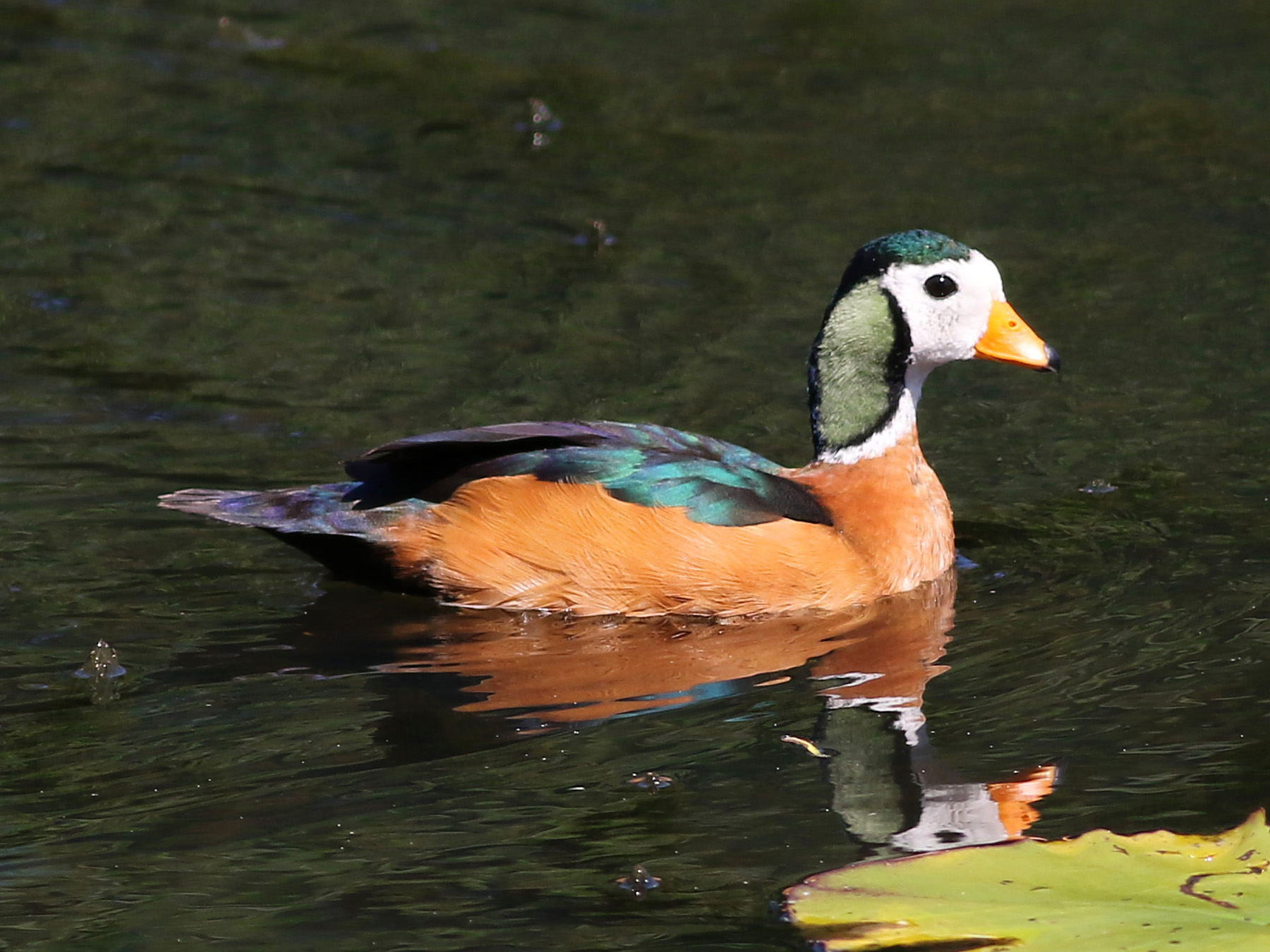
African pygmy goose (Nettapus auritus)

Wood duck (Aix sponsa)

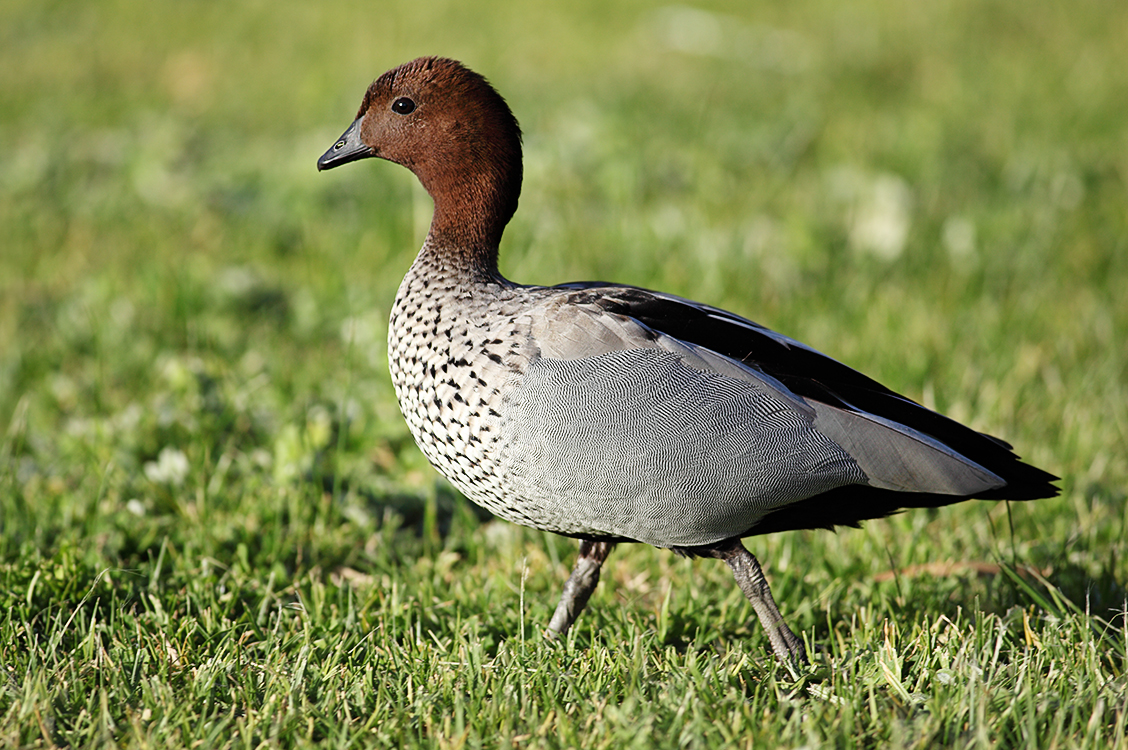
Maned duck (Chenonetta jubata)

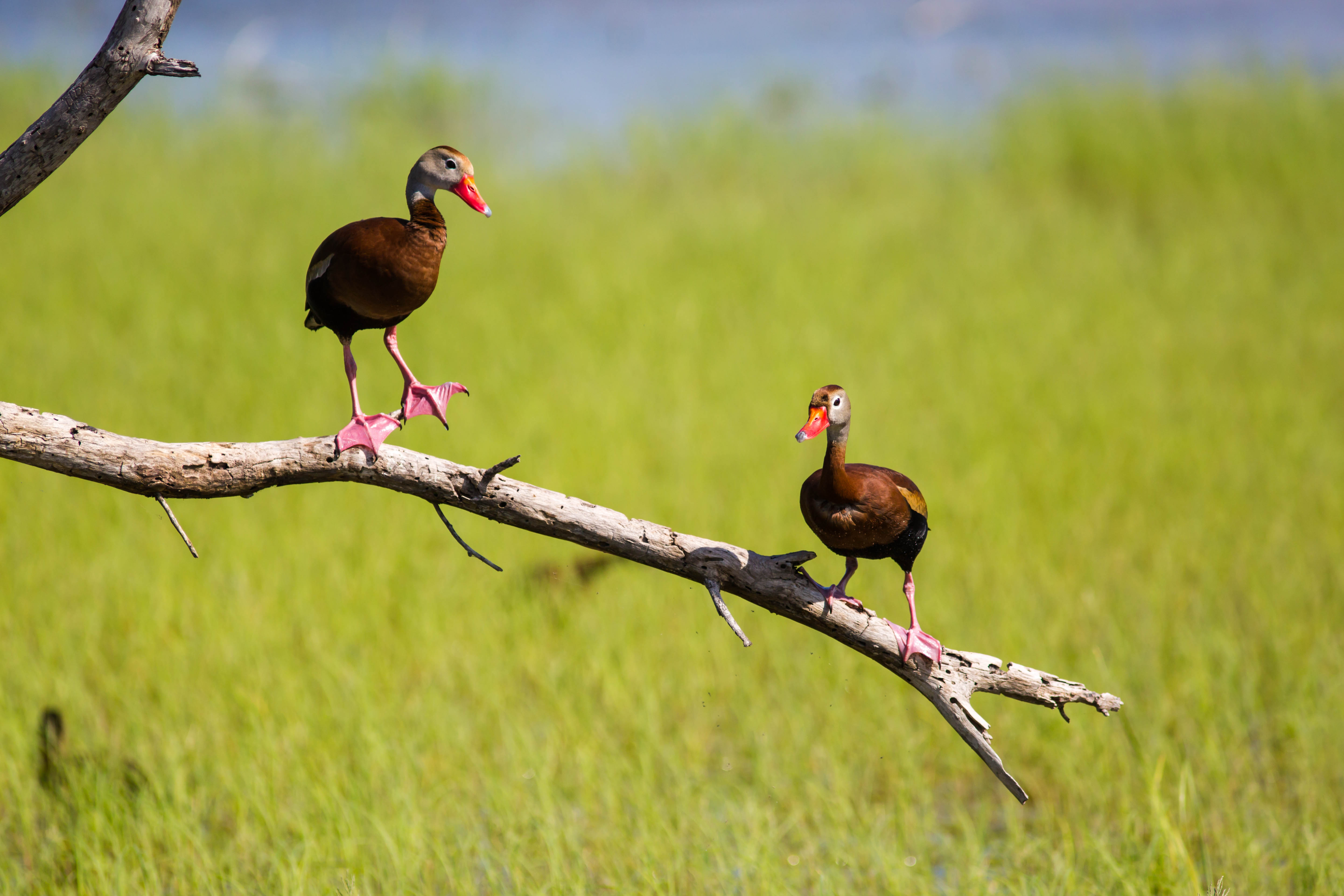
Black-bellied whistling duck (Dendrocygna autumnalis)
