= Regeneration (biology) =

Biological process of renewal, restoration, and tissue growth

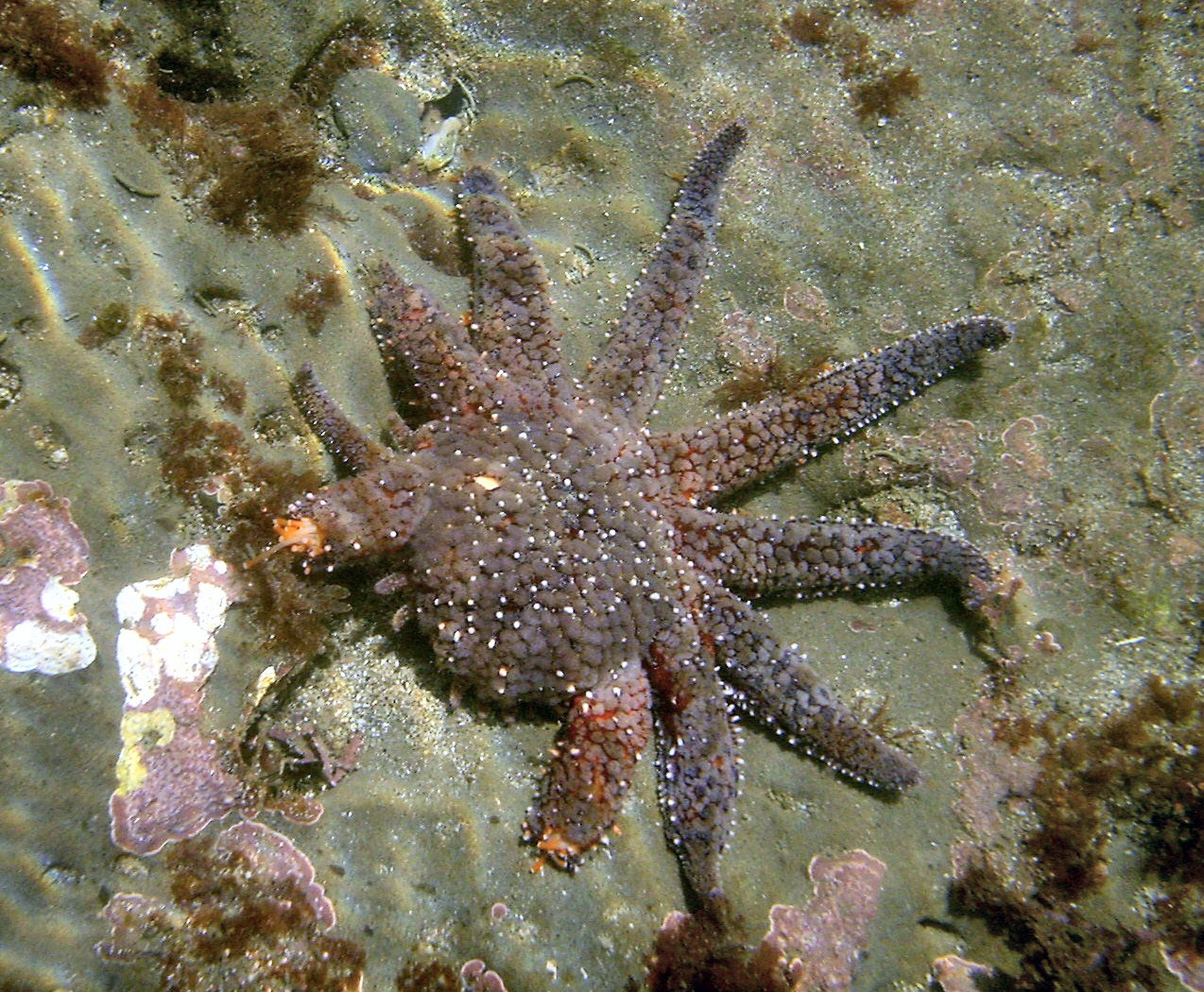
Sunflower sea star regenerates its arms.

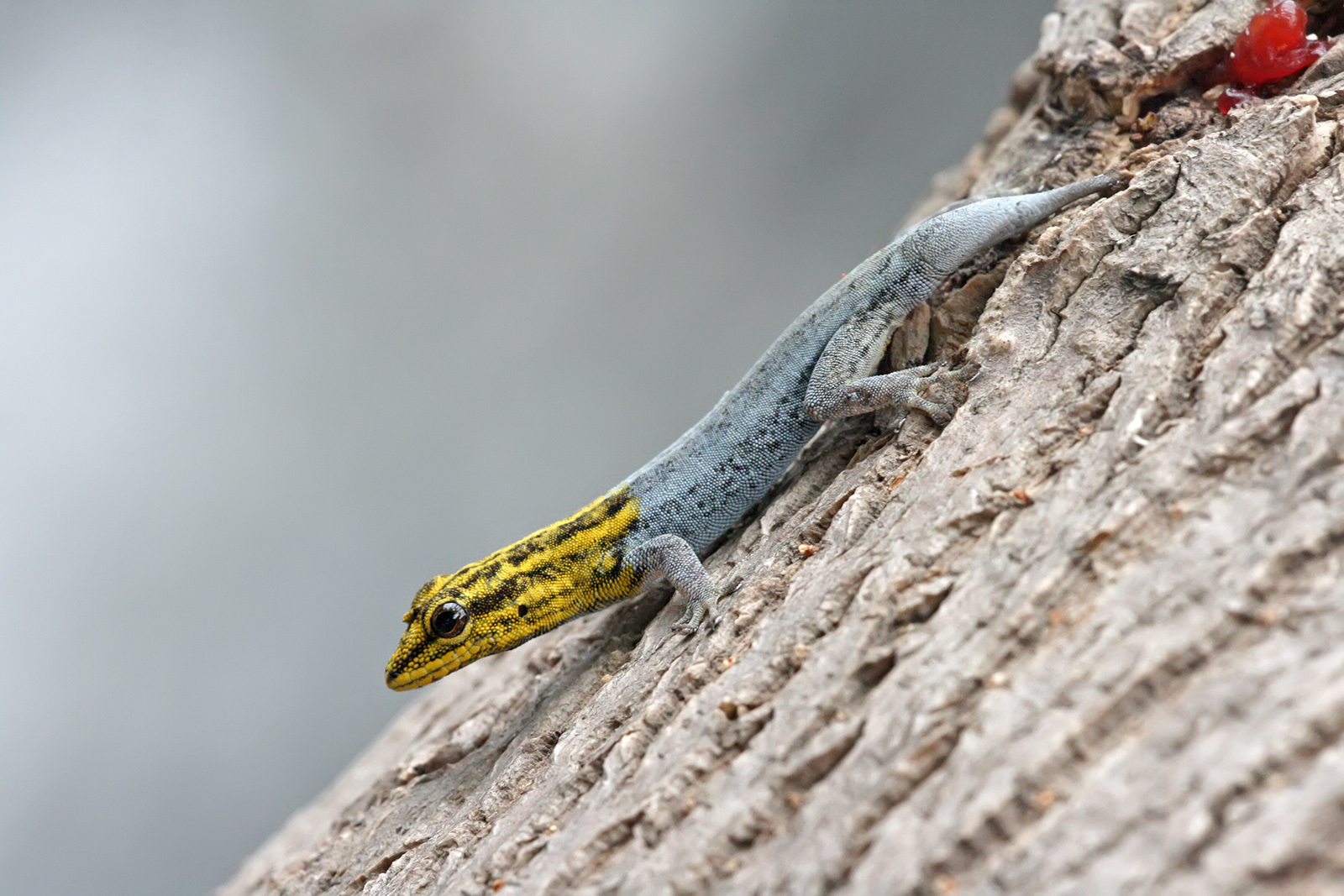
Dwarf yellow-headed gecko with regenerating tail

Regeneration in biology is the process of renewal, restoration, and tissue growth that makes genomes, cells, organisms, and ecosystems resilient to natural fluctuations or events that cause disturbance or damage. Every species is capable of regeneration, from bacteria to humans. Regeneration can either be complete where the new tissue is the same as the lost tissue, or incomplete after which the necrotic tissue becomes fibrotic.

At its most elementary level, regeneration is mediated by the molecular processes of gene regulation and involves the cellular processes of cell proliferation, morphogenesis and cell differentiation. Regeneration in biology, however, mainly refers to the morphogenic processes that characterize the phenotypic plasticity of traits allowing multi-cellular organisms to repair and maintain the integrity of their physiological and morphological states. Above the genetic level, regeneration is fundamentally regulated by asexual cellular processes. Regeneration is different from reproduction. For example, hydra perform regeneration but reproduce by the method of budding.

The regenerative process occurs in two multi-step phases: the preparation phase and the redevelopment phase. Regeneration begins with an amputation which triggers the first phase. Right after the amputation, migrating epidermal cells form a wound epithelium which thickens, through cell division, throughout the first phase to form a cap around the site of the wound. The cells underneath this cap then begin to rapidly divide and form a cone shaped end to the amputation known as a blastema. Included in the blastema are skin, muscle, and cartilage cells that de-differentiate and become similar to stem cells in that they can become multiple types of cells. Cells differentiate to the same purpose they originally filled meaning skin cells again become skin cells and muscle cells become muscles. These de-differentiated cells divide until enough cells are available at which point they differentiate again and the shape of the blastema begins to flatten out. It is at this point that the second phase begins, the redevelopment of the limb. In this stage, genes signal to the cells to differentiate themselves and the various parts of the limb are developed. The end result is a limb that looks and operates identically to the one that was lost, usually without any visual indication that the limb is newly generated.

The hydra and the planarian flatworm have long served as model organisms for their highly adaptive regenerative capabilities. Once wounded, their cells become activated and restore the organs back to their pre-existing state. The Caudata ("urodeles"; salamanders and newts), an order of tailed amphibians, is possibly the most adept vertebrate group at regeneration, given their capability of regenerating limbs, tails, jaws, eyes, and a variety of internal structures. The regeneration of organs is a common and widespread adaptive capability among metazoan creatures. In a related context, some animals are able to reproduce asexually through fragmentation, budding, or fission. A planarian parent, for example, will constrict, split in the middle, and each half generates a new end to form two clones of the original.

Echinoderms (such as the sea star), crayfish, many reptiles, and amphibians exhibit remarkable examples of tissue regeneration. The case of autotomy, for example, serves as a defensive function as the animal detaches a limb or tail to avoid capture. After the limb or tail has been autotomized, cells move into action and the tissues will regenerate. In some cases a shed limb can itself regenerate a new individual. Limited regeneration of limbs occurs in most fishes and salamanders, and tail regeneration takes place in larval frogs and toads (but not adults). The whole limb of a salamander or a triton will grow repeatedly after amputation. In reptiles, chelonians, crocodilians and snakes are unable to regenerate lost parts, but many (not all) kinds of lizards, geckos and iguanas possess regeneration capacity in a high degree. Usually, it involves dropping a section of their tail and regenerating it as part of a defense mechanism. While escaping a predator, if the predator catches the tail, it will disconnect.

== Ecosystems ==
Ecosystems can be regenerative. Following a disturbance, such as a fire or pest outbreak in a forest, pioneering species will occupy, compete for space, and establish themselves in the newly opened habitat. The new growth of seedlings and community assembly process is known as regeneration in ecology.

== Types ==
It is useful to distinguish between two types of regeneration by the triggering circumstances, physiological (homeostatic: cell renewal during normal aging) and reparative (to restore function after injury or loss). Mammals are usually quite adept at the former and has limited capability form the latter. Among reparative regeneration, there are several types in animals:

1. Epimorphosis, where proliferation precedes development of new tissue. It can be further divided into:
  - Epimorphic or compensatory regeneration, which is largely independent of stem cells and relies on the direct recruitment and proliferation of differentiated cells, such as in liver regeneration by hepatocyte proliferation. This restores the volume of the liver, but not its shape.
  - Blastema-mediated epimorphic regeneration, where extreme injury leads to local recruitment of lineage-restricted progenitor cells into a blastema. The blastema would then mature, grow, and reshape to replace the missing structure. This restores the shape of the missing body part. It is seen in limb regrowth in salamanders and full-thickness skin injury in mammals (e.g. human fingertip regeneration). The progenitor cells generally come from proliferation of existing progenitors and/or de-differentiation of mature tissue.
2. Morphallaxis, where existing tissue is re-patterned with little new growth. Common in invertebrates.

=== Cellular molecular fundamentals ===
Pattern formation in the morphogenesis of an animal is regulated by genetic induction factors that put cells to work after damage has occurred. Neural cells, for example, express growth-associated proteins, such as GAP-43, tubulin, actin, an array of novel neuropeptides, and cytokines that induce a cellular physiological response to regenerate from the damage. Many of the genes that are involved in the original development of tissues are reinitialized during the regenerative process. Cells in the primordia of zebrafish fins, for example, express four genes from the homeobox msx family during development and regeneration.

=== Tissues ===
"Strategies include the rearrangement of pre-existing tissue, the use of adult somatic stem cells and the dedifferentiation and/or transdifferentiation of cells, and more than one mode can operate in different tissues of the same animal. All these strategies result in the re-establishment of appropriate tissue polarity, structure and form." During the developmental process, genes are activated that serve to modify the properties of cell as they differentiate into different tissues. Development and regeneration involves the coordination and organization of populations cells into a blastema, which is "a mound of stem cells from which regeneration begins". Dedifferentiation of cells means that they lose their tissue-specific characteristics as tissues remodel during the regeneration process. This should not be confused with the transdifferentiation of cells which is when they lose their tissue-specific characteristics during the regeneration process, and then re-differentiate to a different kind of cell.

== In animals ==
=== Arthropods ===
==== Limb regeneration ====
Many arthropods can regenerate limbs and other appendages following either injury or autotomy. Regeneration capacity is constrained by the developmental stage and ability to molt.

Crustaceans, which continually molt, can regenerate throughout their lifetimes. While molting cycles are generally hormonally regulated, limb amputation induces premature molting.

Hemimetabolous insects such as crickets can regenerate limbs as nymphs, before their final molt.

Holometabolous insects can regenerate appendages as larvae prior to the final molt and metamorphosis. Beetle larvae, for example, can regenerate amputated limbs. Fruit fly larvae do not have limbs but can regenerate their appendage primordia, imaginal discs. In both systems, the regrowth of the new tissue delays pupation.

Mechanisms underlying appendage limb regeneration in insects and crustaceans are highly conserved. During limb regeneration species in both taxa form a blastema that proliferates and grows to repattern the missing tissue.

==== Venom regeneration ====
Arachnids, including scorpions, are known to regenerate their venom, although the content of the regenerated venom is different from the original venom during its regeneration, as the venom volume is replaced before the active proteins are all replenished.

==== Fruit fly model ====
The fruit fly Drosophila melanogaster is a useful model organism to understand the molecular mechanisms that control regeneration, especially gut and germline regeneration. In these tissues, resident stem cells continually renew lost cells. The Hippo signaling pathway was discovered in flies and was found to be required for midgut regeneration. Later, this conserved signaling pathway was also found to be essential for regeneration of many mammalian tissues, including heart, liver, skin, and lung, and intestine.

=== Annelids ===
Many annelids (segmented worms) are capable of regeneration. For example, Chaetopterus variopedatus and Branchiomma nigromaculata can regenerate both anterior and posterior body parts after latitudinal bisection. The relationship between somatic and germline stem cell regeneration has been studied at the molecular level in the annelid Capitella teleta. Leeches, however, appear incapable of segmental regeneration. Furthermore, their close relatives, the branchiobdellids, are also incapable of segmental regeneration. However, certain individuals, like the lumbriculids, can regenerate from only a few segments. Segmental regeneration in these animals is epimorphic and occurs through blastema formation. Segmental regeneration has been gained and lost during annelid evolution, as seen in oligochaetes, where head regeneration has been lost three separate times.

Along with epimorphosis, some polychaetes like Sabella pavonina experience morphallactic regeneration. Morphallaxis involves the de-differentiation, transformation, and re-differentation of cells to regenerate tissues. How prominent morphallactic regeneration is in oligochaetes is currently not well understood. Although relatively under-reported, it is possible that morphallaxis is a common mode of inter-segment regeneration in annelids. Following regeneration in L. variegatus, past posterior segments sometimes become anterior in the new body orientation, consistent with morphallaxis.

Following amputation, most annelids are capable of sealing their body via rapid muscular contraction. Constriction of body muscle can lead to infection prevention. In certain species, such as Limnodrilus, autolysis can be seen within hours after amputation in the ectoderm and mesoderm. Amputation is also thought to cause a large migration of cells to the injury site, and these form a wound plug.

=== Echinoderms ===
Tissue regeneration is widespread among echinoderms and has been well documented in starfish (Asteroidea), sea cucumbers (Holothuroidea), and sea urchins (Echinoidea). Appendage regeneration in echinoderms has been studied since at least the 19th century. In addition to appendages, some species can regenerate internal organs and parts of their central nervous system. In response to injury starfish can autotomize damaged appendages. Autotomy is the self-amputation of a body part, usually an appendage. Depending on severity, starfish will then go through a four-week process where the appendage will be regenerated. Some species must retain mouth cells to regenerate an appendage, due to the need for energy. The first organs to regenerate, in all species documented to date, are associated with the digestive tract. Thus, most knowledge about visceral regeneration in holothurians concerns this system.

=== Planaria (Platyhelminthes) ===
Regeneration research using Planarians began in the late 1800s and was popularized by T.H. Morgan at the beginning of the 20th century. Alejandro Sanchez-Alvarado and Philip Newmark transformed planarians into a model genetic organism in the beginning of the 20th century to study the molecular mechanisms underlying regeneration in these animals. Planarians exhibit an extraordinary ability to regenerate lost body parts. For example, a planarian split lengthwise or crosswise will regenerate into two separate individuals. In one experiment, T.H. Morgan found that a piece corresponding to 1/279th of a planarian or a fragment with as few as 10,000 cells can successfully regenerate into a new worm within one to two weeks. After amputation, stump cells form a blastema formed from neoblasts, pluripotent cells found throughout the planarian body. New tissue grows from neoblasts with neoblasts comprising between 20 and 30% of all planarian cells. Recent work has confirmed that neoblasts are totipotent since one single neoblast can regenerate an entire irradiated animal that has been rendered incapable of regeneration. In order to prevent starvation a planarian will use their own cells for energy, this phenomenon is known as de-growth.

=== Amphibians ===
Limb regeneration in the axolotl and newt has been extensively studied and researched. Although researchers have developed genetically altered axolotls, live cell imaging remains difficult due to the large size of adult axolotls. To fix this issue, they use small juvenile axolotls, focus on smaller amputations like digits, and reduce light distortion caused by refraction in water by using iodixanol, a substance that is safe for living cells and tissues. The nineteenth century studies of this subject are reviewed in Holland (2021). Urodele amphibians, such as salamanders and newts, display the highest regenerative ability among tetrapods. As such, they can fully regenerate their limbs, tail, jaws, and retina via epimorphic regeneration leading to functional replacement with new tissue. Salamander limb regeneration occurs in two main steps. First, the local cells dedifferentiate at the wound site into progenitor to form a blastema. Second, the blastemal cells will undergo cell proliferation, patterning, cell differentiation and tissue growth using similar genetic mechanisms that deployed during embryonic development. Ultimately, blastemal cells will generate all the cells for the new structure.

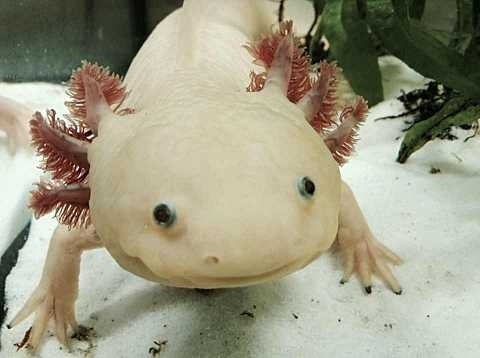
Axolotls can regenerate a variety of structures, including their limbs.

After amputation, the epidermis migrates to cover the stump in 1–2 hours, forming a structure called the wound epithelium (WE). Epidermal cells continue to migrate over the WE, resulting in a thickened, specialized signaling center called the apical epithelial cap (AEC). Over the next several days there are changes in the underlying stump tissues that result in the formation of a blastema (a mass of dedifferentiated proliferating cells). As the blastema forms, pattern formation genes – such as HoxA and HoxD – are activated as they were when the limb was formed in the embryo. The positional identity of the distal tip of the limb (i.e. the autopod, which is the hand or foot) is formed first in the blastema. Intermediate positional identities between the stump and the distal tip are then filled in through a process called intercalation. Motor neurons, muscle, and blood vessels grow with the regenerated limb, and reestablish the connections that were present prior to amputation. The time that this entire process takes varies according to the age of the animal, ranging from about a month to around three months in the adult and then the limb becomes fully functional. Researchers at Australian Regenerative Medicine Institute at Monash University have published that when macrophages, which eat up material debris, were removed, salamanders lost their ability to regenerate and formed scarred tissue instead. The axolotl salamander Ambystoma mexicanum, an organism with exceptional limb regenerative capabilities, likely undergoes epigenetic alterations in its blastema cells that enhance expression of genes involved in limb regeneration. The Axolotl has very little blood and has an excess of epidermal cells. This allows the affected area to then flourish with epidermal cells and continued gene expression allows the area to regenerate to its natural being.

In spite of the historically few researchers studying limb regeneration, remarkable progress has been made recently in establishing the neotenous amphibian the axolotl (Ambystoma mexicanum) as a model genetic organism. This progress has been facilitated by advances in genomics, bioinformatics, and somatic cell transgenesis in other fields, that have created the opportunity to investigate the mechanisms of important biological properties, such as limb regeneration, in the axolotl. The Ambystoma Genetic Stock Center (AGSC) is a self-sustaining, breeding colony of the axolotl supported by the National Science Foundation as a Living Stock Collection. Located at the University of Kentucky, the AGSC is dedicated to supplying genetically well-characterized axolotl embryos, larvae, and adults to laboratories throughout the United States and abroad. An NIH-funded NCRR grant has led to the establishment of the Ambystoma EST database, the Salamander Genome Project (SGP) that has led to the creation of the first amphibian gene map and several annotated molecular data bases, and the creation of the research community web portal. In 2022, a first spatiotemporal map revealed key insights about axolotl brain regeneration, also providing the interactive Axolotl Regenerative Telencephalon Interpretation via Spatiotemporal Transcriptomic Atlas.

==== Frog model ====
Anurans (frogs) can only regenerate their limbs during embryonic development. Reactive oxygen species (ROS) appear to be required for a regeneration response in the anuran larvae. ROS production is essential to activate the Wnt signaling pathway, which has been associated with regeneration in other systems.

Once the limb skeleton has developed in frogs, regeneration does not occur (Xenopus can grow a cartilaginous spike after amputation). The adult Xenopus laevis is used as a model organism for regenerative medicine. In 2022, a cocktail of drugs and hormones (1,4-DPCA, BDNF, growth hormone, resolvin D5, and retinoic acid), in a single dose lasting 24 hours, was shown to trigger long-term leg regeneration in adult X. laevis. Instead of a single spike, a paddle-shaped growth is obtained at the end of the limb by 18 months.

=== Hydra ===
Hydra is a genus of freshwater polyp in the phylum Cnidaria with highly proliferative stem cells that gives them the ability to regenerate their entire body. Any fragment larger than a few hundred epithelial cells that is isolated from the body has the ability to regenerate into a smaller version of itself. The high proportion of stem cells in the hydra supports its efficient regenerative ability.

Regeneration among hydra occurs as foot regeneration arising from the basal part of the body, and head regeneration, arising from the apical region. Regeneration tissues that are cut from the gastric region contain polarity, which allows them to distinguish between regenerating a head in the apical end and a foot in the basal end so that both regions are present in the newly regenerated organism. Head regeneration requires complex reconstruction of the area, while foot regeneration is much simpler, similar to tissue repair. In both foot and head regeneration, however, there are two distinct molecular cascades that occur once the tissue is wounded: early injury response and a subsequent, signal-driven pathway of the regenerating tissue that leads to cellular differentiation. This early-injury response includes epithelial cell stretching for wound closure, the migration of interstitial progenitors towards the wound, cell death, phagocytosis of cell debris, and reconstruction of the extracellular matrix.

Regeneration in hydra has been defined as morphallaxis, the process where regeneration results from remodeling of existing material without cellular proliferation. If a hydra is cut into two pieces, the remaining severed sections form two fully functional and independent hydra, approximately the same size as the two smaller severed sections. This occurs through the exchange and rearrangement of soft tissues without the formation of new material.

During Hydra head regeneration there are coordinated gene expression and chromatin regulation changes. An enhancer is a short DNA sequence (50–1500 base pairs) that can be bound by transcription factors to increase the transcription of a particular gene. In the enhancer regions that are activated during head regeneration, a set of transcription factor motifs commonly occur that appear to facilitate coordinated gene expression.

=== Aves (birds) ===
Owing to a limited literature on the subject, birds are believed to have very limited regenerative abilities as adults. Some studies on roosters have suggested that birds can adequately regenerate some parts of the limbs and depending on the conditions in which regeneration takes place, such as age of the animal, the inter-relationship of the injured tissue with other muscles, and the type of operation, can involve complete regeneration of some musculoskeletal structure. Werber and Goldschmidt (1909) found that the goose and duck were capable of regenerating their beaks after partial amputation and Sidorova (1962) observed liver regeneration via hypertrophy in roosters. Birds are also capable of regenerating the hair cells in their cochlea following noise damage or ototoxic drug damage. Despite this evidence, contemporary studies suggest reparative regeneration in avian species is limited to periods during embryonic development. An array of molecular biology techniques have been successful in manipulating cellular pathways known to contribute to spontaneous regeneration in chick embryos. For instance, removing a portion of the elbow joint in a chick embryo via window excision or slice excision and comparing joint tissue specific markers and cartilage markers showed that window excision allowed 10 out of 20 limbs to regenerate and expressed joint genes similarly to a developing embryo. In contrast, slice excision did not allow the joint to regenerate due to the fusion of the skeletal elements seen by an expression of cartilage markers.

Similar to the physiological regeneration of hair in mammals, birds can regenerate their feathers in order to repair damaged feathers or to attract mates with their plumage. Typically, seasonal changes that are associated with breeding seasons will prompt a hormonal signal for birds to begin regenerating feathers. This has been experimentally induced using thyroid hormones in the Rhode Island Red Fowls.

=== Mammals ===
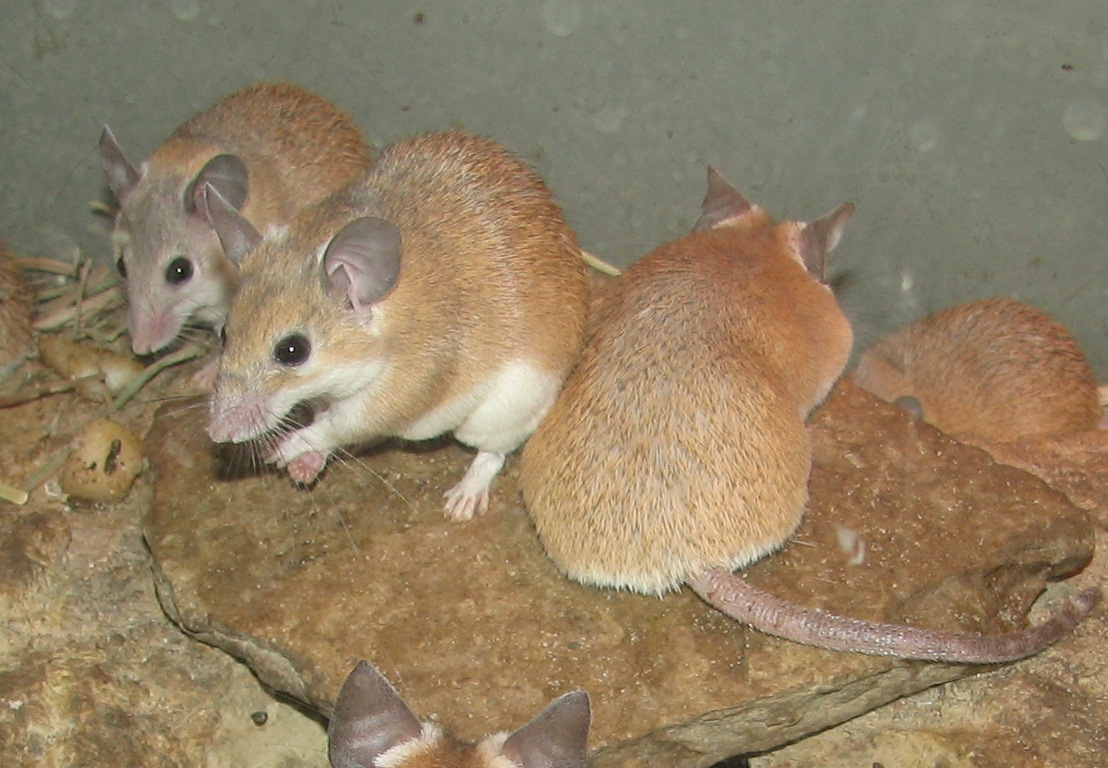
Spiny mice (Acomys cahirinus pictured here) can regenerate skin, cartilage, nerves and muscle.

Mammals are capable of cellular and physiological regeneration, but have generally poor reparative regenerative ability across the group. Examples of physiological regeneration in mammals include epithelial renewal (e.g., skin and intestinal tract), red blood cell replacement, antler regeneration and hair cycling. Male deer lose their antlers annually during the months of January to April then through regeneration are able to regrow them as an example of physiological regeneration. A deer antler is the only appendage of a mammal that can be regrown every year. The regenerative properties of deer antlers have also been applied experimentally to repair bone defects in mice through the use of a bone graft. This graft made use of a decellularized antler scaffold and extra-cellular vesicles originating from antler blastema progenitor cells.

While reparative regeneration is a rare phenomenon in mammals, it does occur. A well-documented example is regeneration of the digit tip distal to the nail bed. Reparative regeneration has also been observed in rabbits, pikas and African spiny mice. In 2012, researchers discovered that two species of African spiny mice, Acomys kempi and Acomys percivali, were capable of completely regenerating the autotomically released or otherwise damaged tissue. These species can regrow hair follicles, skin, sweat glands, fur and cartilage. In addition to these two species, subsequent studies demonstrated that Acomys cahirinus could regenerate skin and excised tissue in the ear pinna.

Despite these examples, it is generally accepted that adult mammals have limited regenerative capacity compared to most vertebrate embryos/larvae, adult salamanders and fish. But the regeneration therapy approach of Robert O. Becker, using electrical stimulation, has shown promising results for rats and mammals in general. Most studies of mammalian regeneration have been done on rodents and human cell cultures. When studies are done on living humans, it appears that the basic principles are usually the same as what was found in these model systems.

Some researchers have also claimed that the MRL mouse strain exhibits enhanced regenerative abilities. Work comparing the differential gene expression of scarless healing MRL mice and a poorly-healing C57BL/6 mouse strain, identified 36 genes differentiating the healing process between MRL mice and other mice. Study of the regenerative process in these animals is aimed at discovering how to duplicate them in humans, such as deactivation of the p21 gene. However, recent work has shown that MRL mice actually close small ear holes with scar tissue, rather than regeneration as originally claimed.

MRL mice are not protected against myocardial infarction; heart regeneration in adult mammals (neocardiogenesis) is limited, because heart muscle cells are nearly all terminally differentiated. MRL mice show the same amount of cardiac injury and scar formation as normal mice after a heart attack. However, recent studies provide evidence that this may not always be the case, and that MRL mice can regenerate after heart damage.

==== Humans ====
The regrowth of lost tissues or organs in the human body is being researched. Some tissues such as skin regrow quite readily; others have been thought to have little or no capacity for regeneration, but ongoing research suggests that there is some hope for a variety of tissues and organs. Human organs that have been artificially regenerated include the bladder, vagina and the penis.

As are all metazoans, humans are capable of physiological regeneration (i.e. the replacement of cells during homeostatic maintenance that does not necessitate injury). For example, the regeneration of red blood cells via erythropoiesis occurs through the maturation of erythrocytes from hematopoietic stem cells in the bone marrow, their subsequent circulation for around 90 days in the blood stream, and their eventual cell-death in the spleen. Another example of physiological regeneration is the sloughing and rebuilding of a functional endometrium during each menstrual cycle in females in response to varying levels of circulating estrogen and progesterone.

However, humans are limited in their capacity for reparative regeneration, which occurs in response to injury. One of the most studied regenerative responses in humans is the hyperplasia of the liver following liver injury. For example, the original mass of the liver is re-established in direct proportion to the amount of liver removed following partial hepatectomy, which indicates that signals from the body regulate liver mass precisely, both positively and negatively, until the desired mass is reached. This response is considered cellular regeneration (a form of compensatory hyperplasia) where the function and mass of the liver is regenerated through the proliferation of existing mature hepatic cells (mainly hepatocytes), but the exact morphology of the liver is not regained. This process is driven by growth factor and cytokine regulated pathways. The normal sequence of inflammation and regeneration does not function accurately in cancer. Specifically, cytokine stimulation of cells leads to expression of genes that change cellular functions and suppress the immune response.

Adult neurogenesis is also a form of cellular regeneration. For example, hippocampal neuron renewal occurs in normal adult humans at an annual turnover rate of 1.75% of neurons. Cardiac myocyte renewal has been found to occur in normal adult humans, and at a higher rate in adults following acute heart injury such as infarction. Even in adult myocardium following infarction, proliferation is only found in around 1% of myocytes around the area of injury, which is not enough to restore function of cardiac muscle. However, this may be an important target for regenerative medicine as it implies that regeneration of cardiomyocytes, and consequently of myocardium, can be induced.

Another example of reparative regeneration in humans is fingertip regeneration, which occurs after phalanx amputation distal to the nail bed (especially in children) and rib regeneration, which occurs following osteotomy for scoliosis treatment (though usually regeneration is only partial and may take up to one year).

Yet another example of regeneration in humans is vas deferens regeneration, which occurs after a vasectomy and which results in vasectomy failure.

=== Reptiles ===
The ability and degree of regeneration in reptiles differs among the various species (see), but the most notable and well-studied occurrence is tail-regeneration in lizards. In addition to lizards, regeneration has been observed in the tails and maxillary bone of crocodiles and adult neurogenesis has also been noted. Tail regeneration has never been observed in snakes, but see. Lizards possess the highest regenerative capacity as a group. Following autotomous tail loss, epimorphic regeneration of a new tail proceeds through a blastema-mediated process that results in a functionally and morphologically similar structure.

=== Chondrichthyes ===
It has been estimated that the average shark loses about 30,000 to 40,000 teeth in a lifetime. Leopard sharks routinely replace their teeth every 9–12 days and this is an example of physiological regeneration. This can occur because shark teeth are not attached to a bone, but instead are developed within a bony cavity.

Rhodopsin regeneration has been studied in skates and rays. After complete photo-bleaching, rhodopsin can completely regenerate within 2 hours in the retina.

White bamboo sharks can regenerate at least two-thirds of their liver and this has been linked to three micro RNAs, xtr-miR-125b, fru-miR-204, and has-miR-142-3p_R-. In one study, two-thirds of the liver was removed and within 24 hours more than half of the liver had undergone hypertrophy.

Some sharks can regenerate scales and even skin following damage. Within two weeks of skin wounding, mucus is secreted into the wound and this initiates the healing process. One study showed that the majority of the wounded area was regenerated within 4 months, but the regenerated area also showed a high degree of variability.

== See also ==
- Regenerative biology
- Autotomy
- Cloning
- Regenerative medicine
- Neuroregeneration
- Organ transplantation
- Epimorphosis
- Morphallaxis
- Polyphyodont

== Sources ==
- Tanaka EM (October 2003). "Cell differentiation and cell fate during urodele tail and limb regeneration". Current Opinion in Genetics & Development. 13 (5): 497–501. doi:10.1016/j.gde.2003.08.003. PMID 14550415.
- Holland ND (2021). "Vicenzo Colucci's 1886 memoir, Intorno alla rigenerazione degli arti e della coda nei tritoni, annotated and translated into English as: Concerning regeneration of the limbs and tail in salamanders". The European Zoological Journal. 88: 837–890. doi:10.1080/24750263.2021.1943549. S2CID 238904520.
- Nye HL, Cameron JA, Chernoff EA, Stocum DL (February 2003). "Regeneration of the urodele limb: a review". Developmental Dynamics. 226 (2): 280–94. doi:10.1002/dvdy.10236. PMID 12557206. S2CID 28442979.
- Yu H, Mohan S, Masinde GL, Baylink DJ (December 2005). "Mapping the dominant wound healing and soft tissue regeneration QTL in MRL x CAST". Mammalian Genome. 16 (12): 918–24. doi:10.1007/s00335-005-0077-0. PMID 16341671. S2CID 24505367.
- Gardiner DM, Blumberg B, Komine Y, Bryant SV (June 1995). "Regulation of HoxA expression in developing and regenerating axolotl limbs". Development. 121 (6): 1731–41. doi:10.1242/dev.121.6.1731. PMID 7600989.
- Torok MA, Gardiner DM, Shubin NH, Bryant SV (August 1998). "Expression of HoxD genes in developing and regenerating axolotl limbs". Developmental Biology. 200 (2): 225–33. doi:10.1006/dbio.1998.8956. PMID 9705229.
- Putta S, Smith JJ, Walker JA, Rondet M, Weisrock DW, Monaghan J, Samuels AK, Kump K, King DC, Maness NJ, Habermann B, Tanaka E, Bryant SV, Gardiner DM, Parichy DM, Voss SR (August 2004). "From biomedicine to natural history research: EST resources for ambystomatid salamanders". BMC Genomics. 5 (1) 54. Bibcode:2004BMCG....5...54P. doi:10.1186/1471-2164-5-54. PMC 509418. PMID 15310388.
- Andrews, Wyatt (March 23, 2008). "Medicine's Cutting Edge: Re-Growing Organs". Sunday Morning. CBS News. Archived from the original on 2008-03-24.
