= Leipzig Zoological Garden =

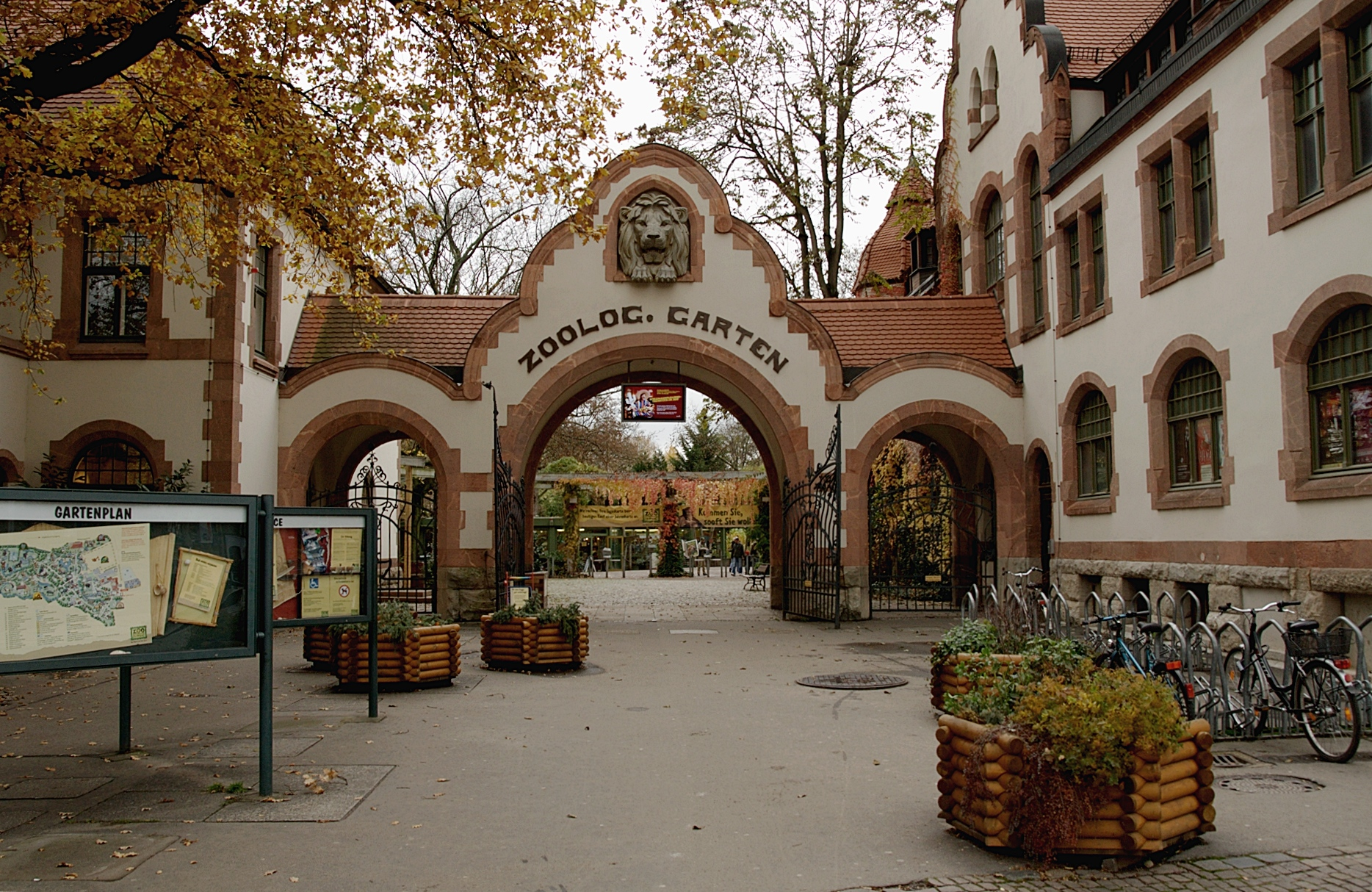
- The main entrance
- Interactive map of Leipzig Zoological Garden
- 51.349°N 12.369°E
- Date opened: June 9, 1878
- Location: Pfaffendorfer-Strasse 29, Leipzig, Germany
- Land area: 27 hectares (67 acres)
- No. of animals: 8077 (2019)
- No. of species: ~850 (2019)
- Annual visitors: 2 million (2011)
- Memberships: EAZA, WAZA
- Website: www.zoo-leipzig.de/en/

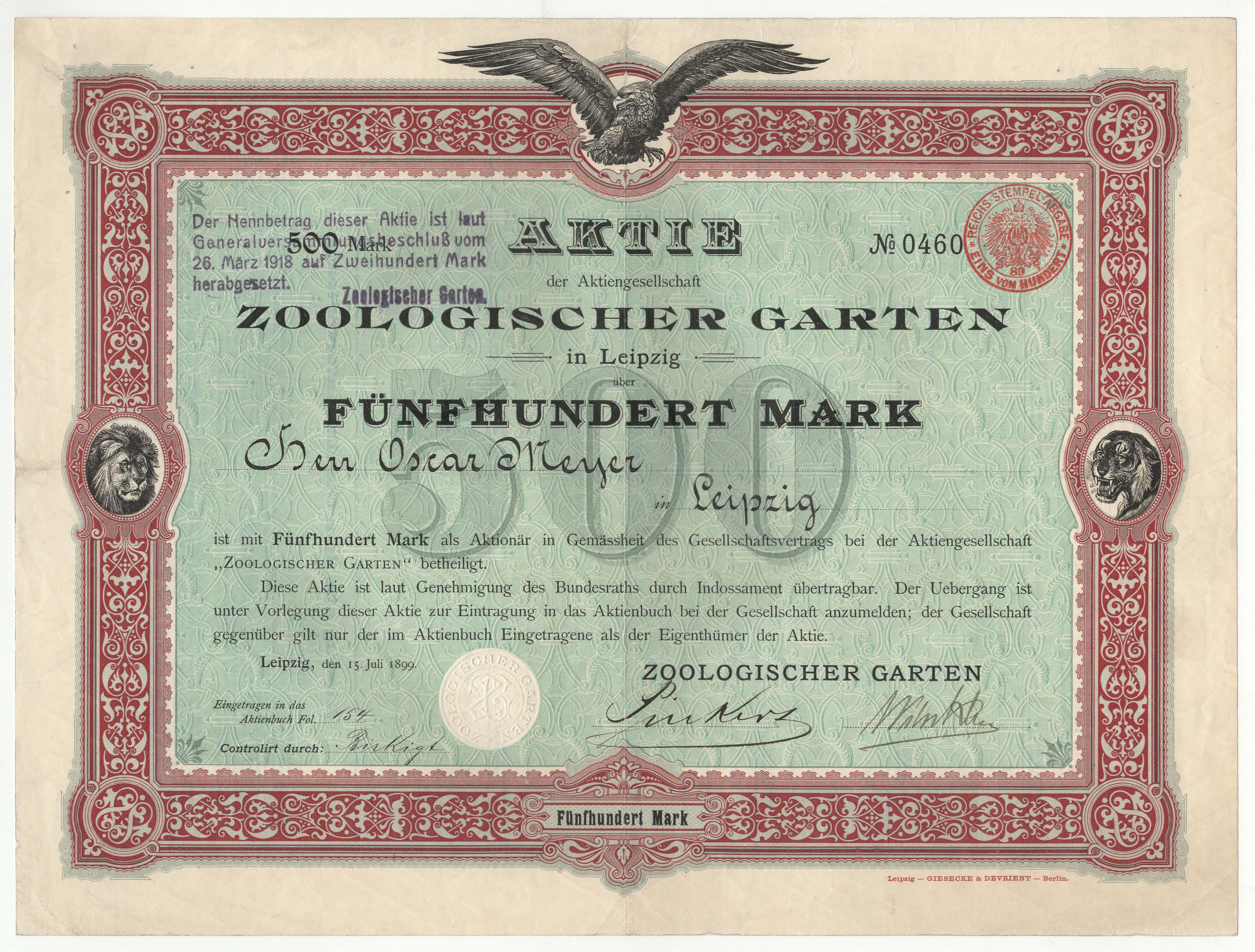
Founder's share of the AG Zoologischer Garten, issued 15 July 1899 with the signature of the founder Ernst Pinkert

Leipzig Zoological Garden, or Leipzig Zoo (German: Zoologischer Garten Leipzig), is a zoo in the Leipzig borough of Mitte, locality Zentrum-Nordwest, Germany. It was first opened on June 9, 1878. It was taken over by the city of Leipzig in 1920 after World War I and now covers about 27 hectares (67 acres) and contains approximately 850 species. By 2020, the zoo featured six different theme worlds, aiming at providing habitats appropriate for the species on display.

Leipzig Zoo is internationally noted for its large building projects such as Pongoland (housing gorillas, chimpanzees, bonobos and orangutans) and Gondwanaland (the world's second largest indoor rainforest hall at 1.65 ha or 4.1 acres). It has bred more than 2,000 lions, 250 rare Siberian tigers, and other carnivores like bears. Leipzig Zoological Garden has been called the "Zoo of the future". It is ranked as the best zoo in Germany and also the second-best in Europe (after Vienna).

== Theme worlds ==
The Zoo Leipzig hosts six different theme worlds; the Founder's Garden, Gondwanaland, Asia, Pongoland, Africa and South America. Zoo director Prof. Dr. Jörg Junhold aimed to combine species conservation, with spacious compounds, which are as appropriate for the species kept within as possible. Additionally the zoo offers educational tours to visitor groups and various special events.

=== Founder's Garden ===
The Founder's Garden is located close to the entrance, partially in historical buildings. Besides the explorer's arch, which is also used for educational purposes this part of the zoo includes compounds displaying koalas since 2016 in the former ape house as well as a budgerigar aviary and primate islands.

List of animals
- Bearded emperor tamarin
- Budgerigar
- Coppery titi monkey
- Golden lion tamarin
- Koala
- White-faced saki

Aquarium

- Bird wrasse
- Black arowana
- Blackspotted puffer
- Bluestreak cleaner wrasse
- Blue-girdled angelfish
- Bonnethead shark
- Chindongo saulosi
- Clown anemonefish
- Clown triggerfish
- Disk tetra
- Duckbill catfish
- Fire eel
- Kotsovato
- Longhorn boxfish
- Malawi hawk cichlid
- Mexican tetra
- Moon jellyfish
- Palette surgeonfish
- Rainbow shiner
- Smooth back river stingray
- Spotted garden eel
- Teardrop angelfish
- Tiger tail seahorse
- Weedy scorpionfish
- White-blotched river stingray
- Xingu peacock bass
- Yellow tang
- Yellowtail tang

=== Gondwanaland ===
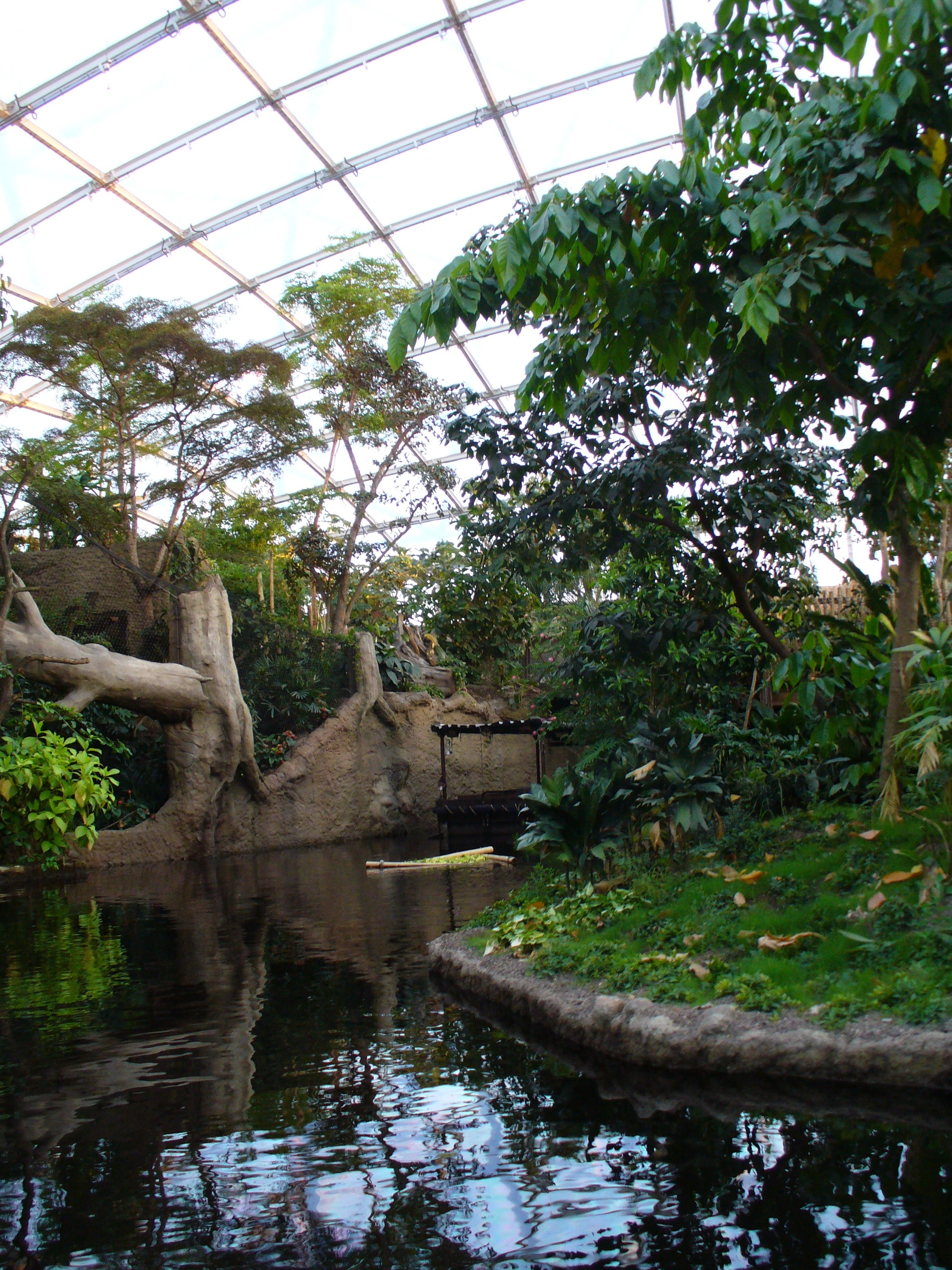
Inside Gondwanaland

In 2010, the massive greenhouse Gondwanaland opened comprising an area larger than two football pitches (16,500 square metres (178,000 sq ft)). It has its own tropical climate and hosts 170 exotic animal species and around 500 different plant species from Africa, Asia and South America. There is a treetop trail, with squirrel monkeys jumping around very closely. Visitors can also take a small open boat (for a small extra fee) to gain a different perspective.

Another rare animal living in Gondwanaland is the eastern quoll, a medium-sized carnivorous dasyurid marsupial native to Australia.

List of animals

Mammals

- Black and rufous sengi
- Black-rumped agouti
- Crowned lemur
- Diana monkey
- Eastern quoll
- Fishing cat
- Giant otter
- Guianan squirrel monkey
- Island flying fox
- Kirk's dik-dik
- Kowari
- Linne's two-toed sloth
- Malayan tapir
- Ocelot
- Oriental small-clawed otter
- Owl-faced monkey
- Pygmy hippopotamus
- Pygmy marmoset

Birds

- African green pigeon
- African pygmy goose
- Allen's gallinule
- Bernier's teal
- Black crake
- Blue-throated piping guan
- Brahminy starling
- Brazilian teal
- Crested partridge
- Cuban grassquit
- Fulvous whistling duck
- Germain's peacock-pheasant
- Hartlaub's turaco
- Madagascar ibis
- Masked lapwing
- Nicobar pigeon
- Pied imperial pigeon
- Radjah shelduck
- Red fody
- Red-whiskered bulbul
- Sunbittern
- Turquoise tanager
- Victoria crowned pigeon
- White-crowned robin-chat

Reptiles

- Arrau turtle
- Asian brown tortoise
- Brown anole
- Dwarf yellow-headed gecko
- Eastern long-necked turtle
- Green iguana
- Komodo dragon
- Madagascar giant day gecko
- Malaysian giant turtle
- Pig-nosed turtle
- Radiated tortoise
- Spotted pond turtle
- Sunda gharial
- Tokay gecko
- Turquoise dwarf gecko

Amphibians

- File-eared tree frog
- Golden mantella
- Greenhouse frog
- Hong Kong whipping frog
- Mission golden-eyed tree frog
- Tomato frog
- White's tree frog
- Yellow stream frog
- Yellow-banded poison dart frog

Fish

- Arapaima
- Atlantic mudskipper
- Australian lungfish
- Giant gourami
- Giant pacu
- Largescale four-eyes
- Red-bellied piranha
- Redtail catfish
- South American lungfish
- Spotted gar
- West African lungfish

Invertebrates

- Coastal horseshoe crab
- Leaf-cutting ant

=== Asia ===
One of the main attractions of this theme world are the Indian elephants. They have their own swimming pool, complete with a visitor gallery underneath. The critically endangered Chinese pangolin – almost extinct in the wild – also inhabits this part of the zoo.

Until they finally received an appropriate environment in 2017, the snow leopards lived in „traditional cages“ like the panther Rainer Maria Rilke wrote about in 1902.

List of animals
- Amur leopard
- Amur tiger
- Bali myna
- Black-headed ibis
- Carniolan honey bee
- Chinese pangolin
- Dalmatian pelican
- Eld's deer
- Eurasian harvest mouse
- Glossy ibis
- Gray slender loris
- Griffon vulture
- Hermit ibis
- Himalayan monal
- Indian elephant
- Indian pond heron
- Indian sloth bear
- Lowland anoa
- Pink-necked green pigeon
- Przewalski's wild horse
- Pygmy slow loris
- Red panda
- Rhesus macaque
- Snow leopard
- Southern three-banded armadillo
- Sri Lankan giant squirrel
- Swinhoe's striped squirrel
- Tufted deer
- Ural owl
- Visayan warty pig
- White-naped crane
- Woolly-necked stork

=== Pongoland ===
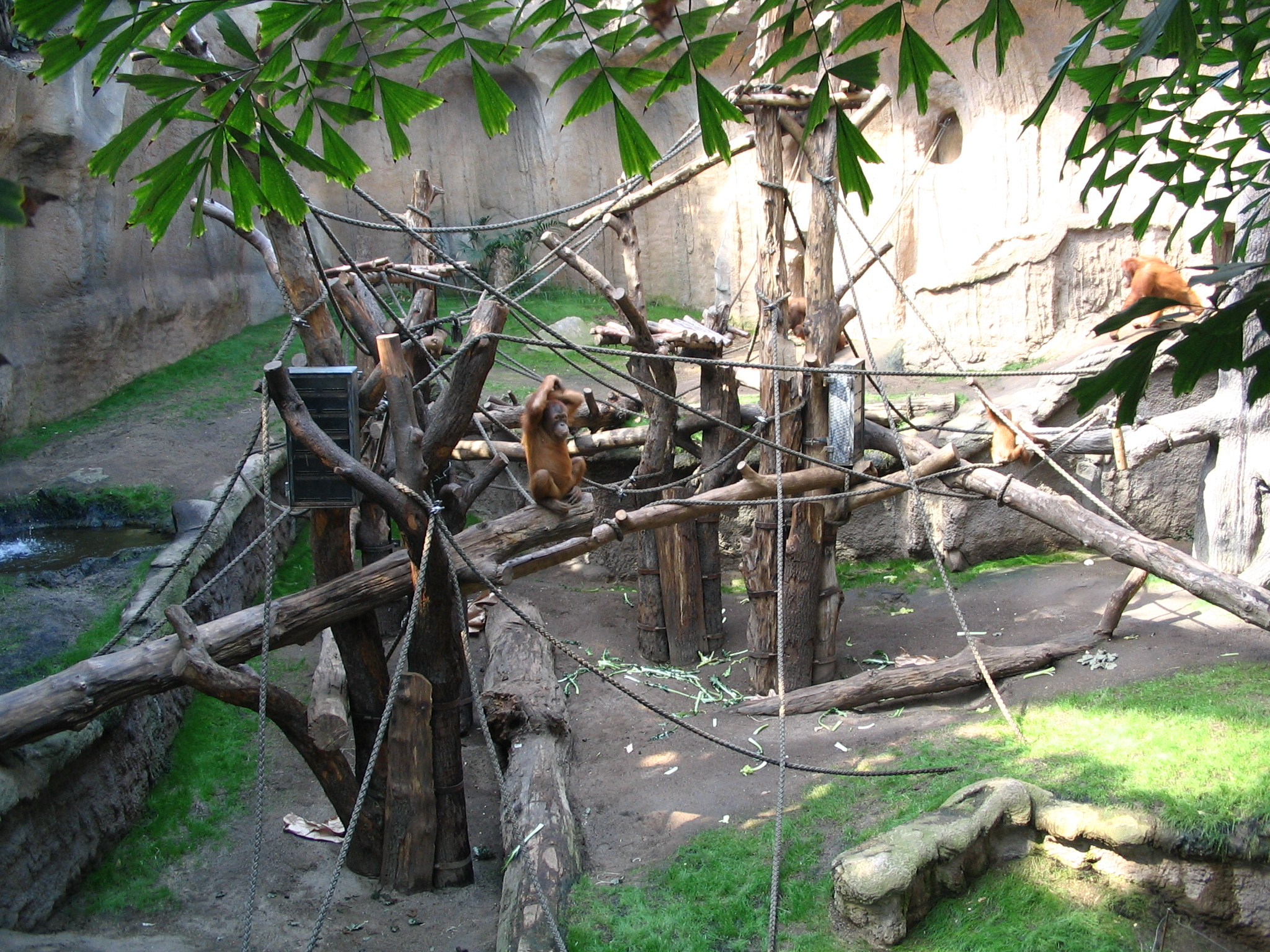
Orangutans at Pongoland

The modern ape-world with spacious outdoor facilities was opened in 2001 and allows four species of primates to live in family groups. Besides that it hosts a research centre in cooperation with the Max Planck Institute for Evolutionary Anthropology. The Wolfgang Köhler Primate Research Center is situated in Pogoland, operating in collaboration with the Leipzig Zoo. The research focuses on both behavior and cognition of the four species of great apes: chimpanzees, gorillas (in this case western lowland gorillas), orangutans, and bonobos. There is a special focus on the ontogeny (origin and development) of chimpanzee cognition. When it was planned and constructed the Yerkes National Primate Research Center functioned as the role model for its creation.

All of the primate species participate in the European Association of Zoos and Aquaria which is part of the EAZA Ex-situ Programme. Numerous young apes were born in Leipzig since Pongoland opened.

List of animals
- Blue-bellied roller
- Bonobo
- Chimpanzee
- Sumatran orangutan
- Violet turaco
- Western lowland gorilla

=== Africa ===
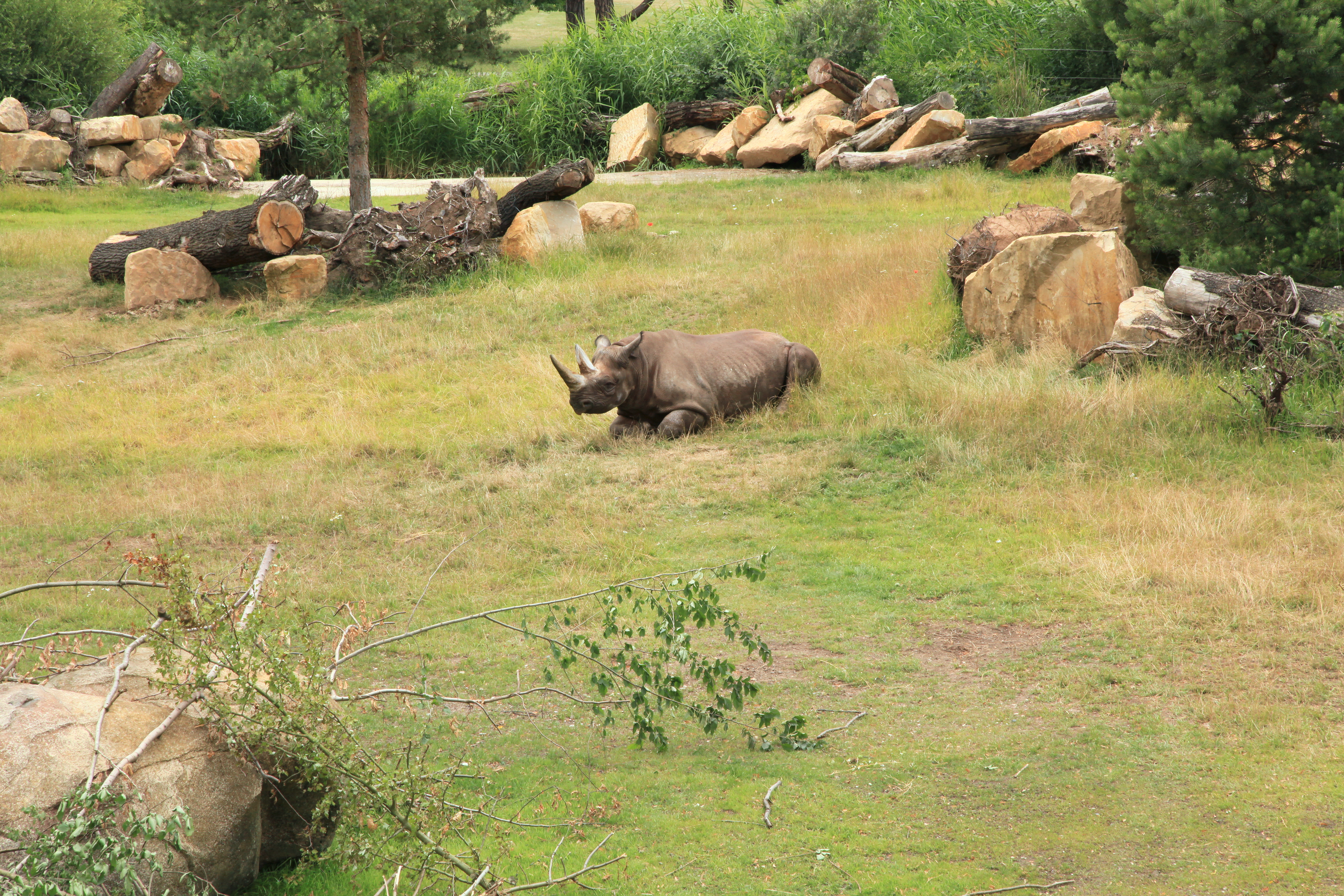
Black rhino in Kiwara Savannah

One of the main attractions of the African area is the 25,000 m^{2} (270,000 sq ft) Kiwara Savannah, a shared habitat occupied by Grévy's zebras, Rothschild's giraffes, Thomson's gazelles, Nile lechwes and ostriches. Among the other animals are lions, hyena and the very popular meerkats.

List of animals
- African lion
- Ankole-Watusi
- Ansell's mole-rat
- Baringo giraffe
- Cape porcupine
- Common dwarf mongoose
- Eastern black rhinoceros
- Fat sand rat
- Grévy's zebra
- Grey crowned crane
- Lesser flamingo
- Nile lechwe
- Okapi
- Patas monkey
- Scimitar-horned oryx
- Short-eared elephant shrew
- Slender-tailed meerkat
- Southern cheetah
- Southern ostrich
- Spotted hyena
- Thomson's gazelle
- Cameroon sheep
- Vietnamese pot-bellied pig

=== South America ===
This area is scheduled to be redesigned to host a South American landscape with a large aquatic habitat will be opened for seals and penguins. Guanacos, flamingos and Chacoan peccaries are amongst the inhabitants (before reconstruction).

List of animals
- Black-faced ibis
- California sea lion
- Capybara
- Chacoan peccary
- Chilean flamingo
- Giant anteater
- Guanaco
- Lesser rhea
- Maned wolf
- Patagonian mara
- Puna teal
- Red shoveler
- Roseate spoonbill
- Rosy-billed pochard
- Scarlet ibis
- White-faced whistling duck
- White-nosed coati
- Yellow-billed pintail

El Ranchito

- African pygmy goat
- Flemish Giant rabbit
- Guinea pig
- Llama
- Welsummer chicken

=== Other animals ===
List of animals

Mammals

- Lion-tailed macaque
- Red-necked wallaby
- Siberian musk deer
- South African fur seals

Birds

- Asian fairy-bluebird
- Black bulbul
- Black-naped fruit dove
- Blue-crowned hanging parrot
- Blue-crowned laughingthrush
- Blue-headed quail-dove
- Brazilian tanager
- Cinnamon ground dove
- Citron-crested cockatoo
- Crimson-bellied parakeet
- Edwards's pheasant
- Lord Derby's parakeet
- Military macaw
- Montserrat oriole
- Purple-naped lory
- Rainbow lorikeet
- Red-legged honeycreeper
- Sclater's crowned pigeon
- Spotted thick-knee
- Sunset lorikeet
- Violaceous euphonia
- Violet-backed starling
- White-headed buffalo weaver
- White-rumped shama
- Yellow-crowned bishop
- Yellow-crowned gonolek

== Gallery ==
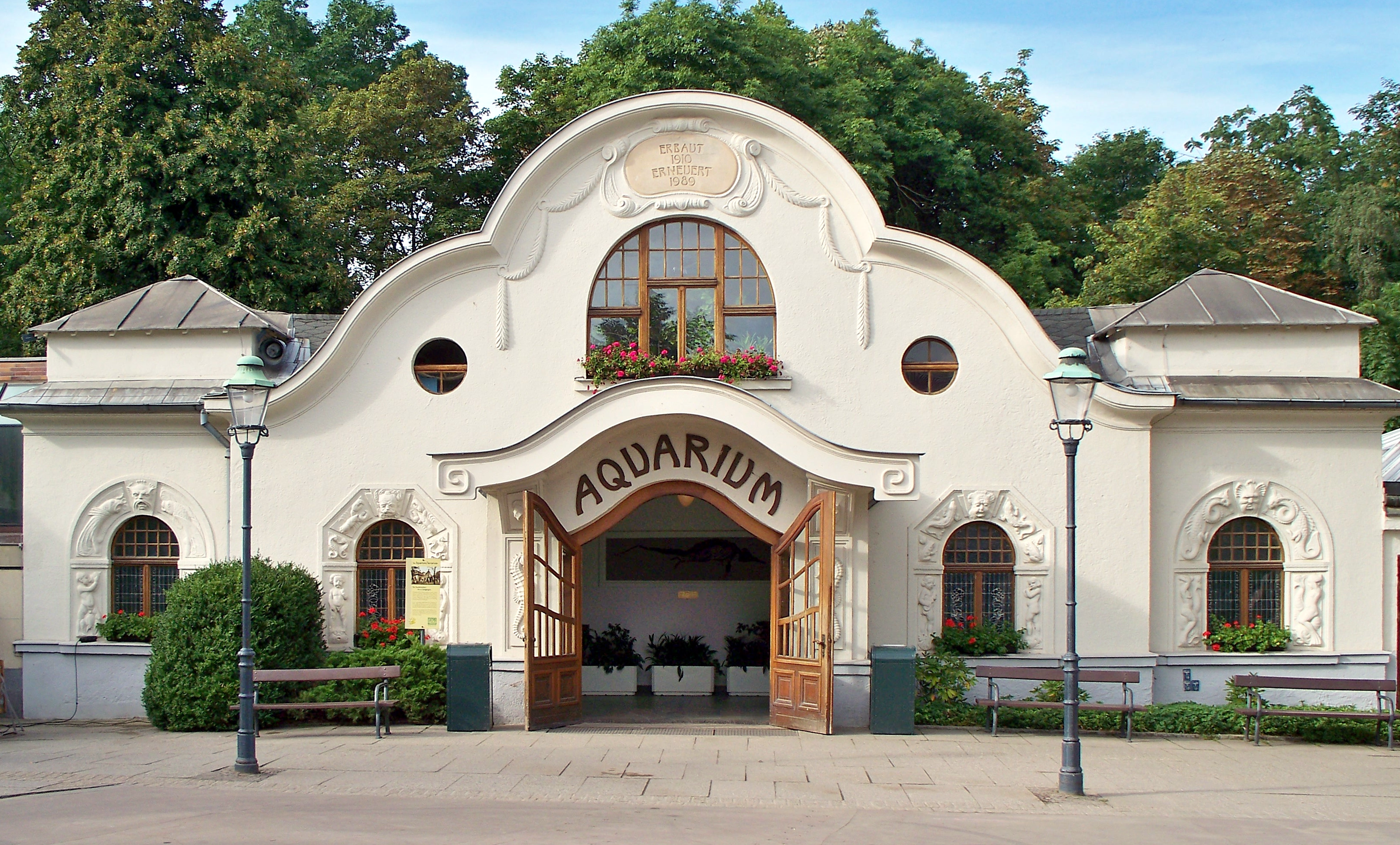
Entrance to the aquarium

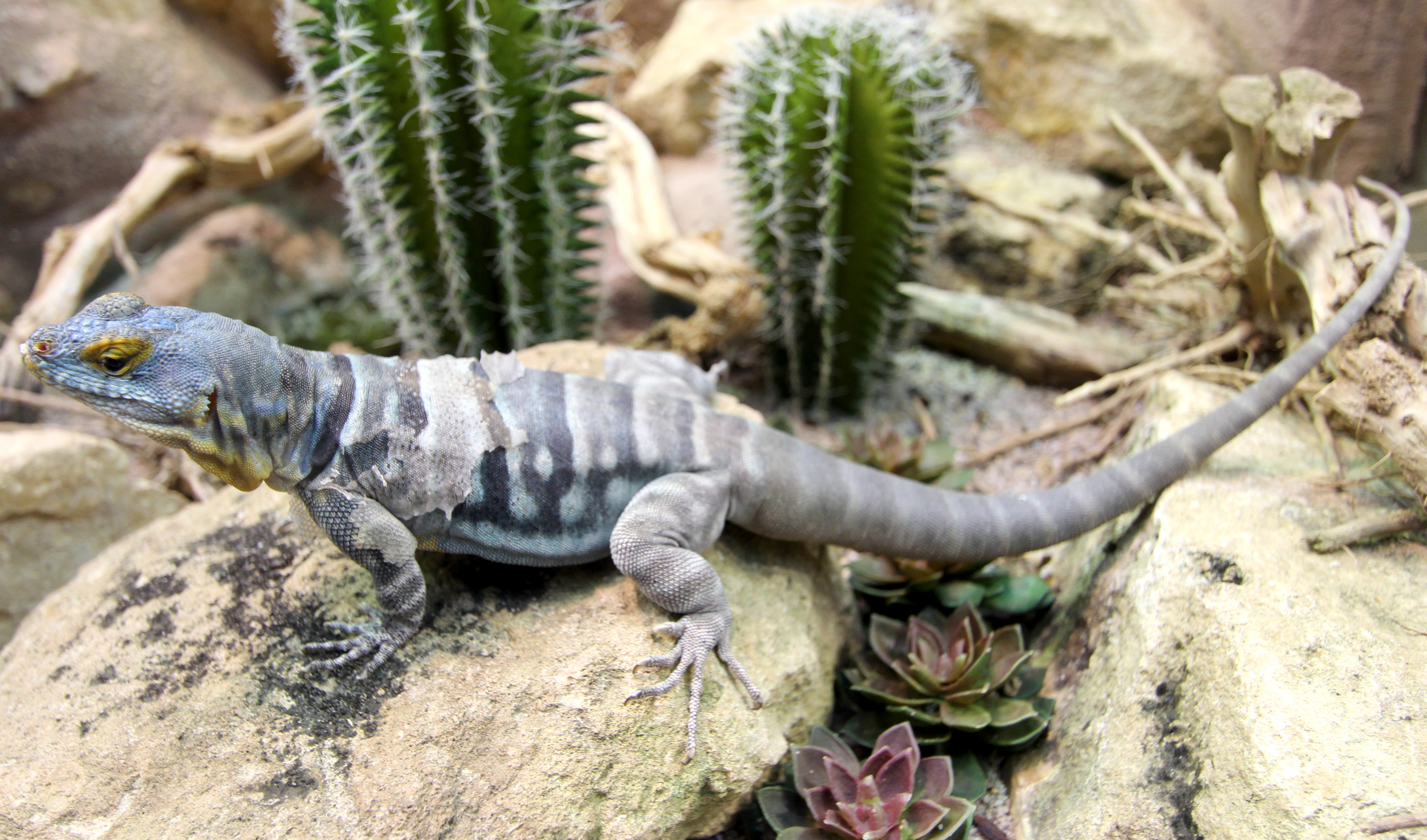
Baja blue rock lizard

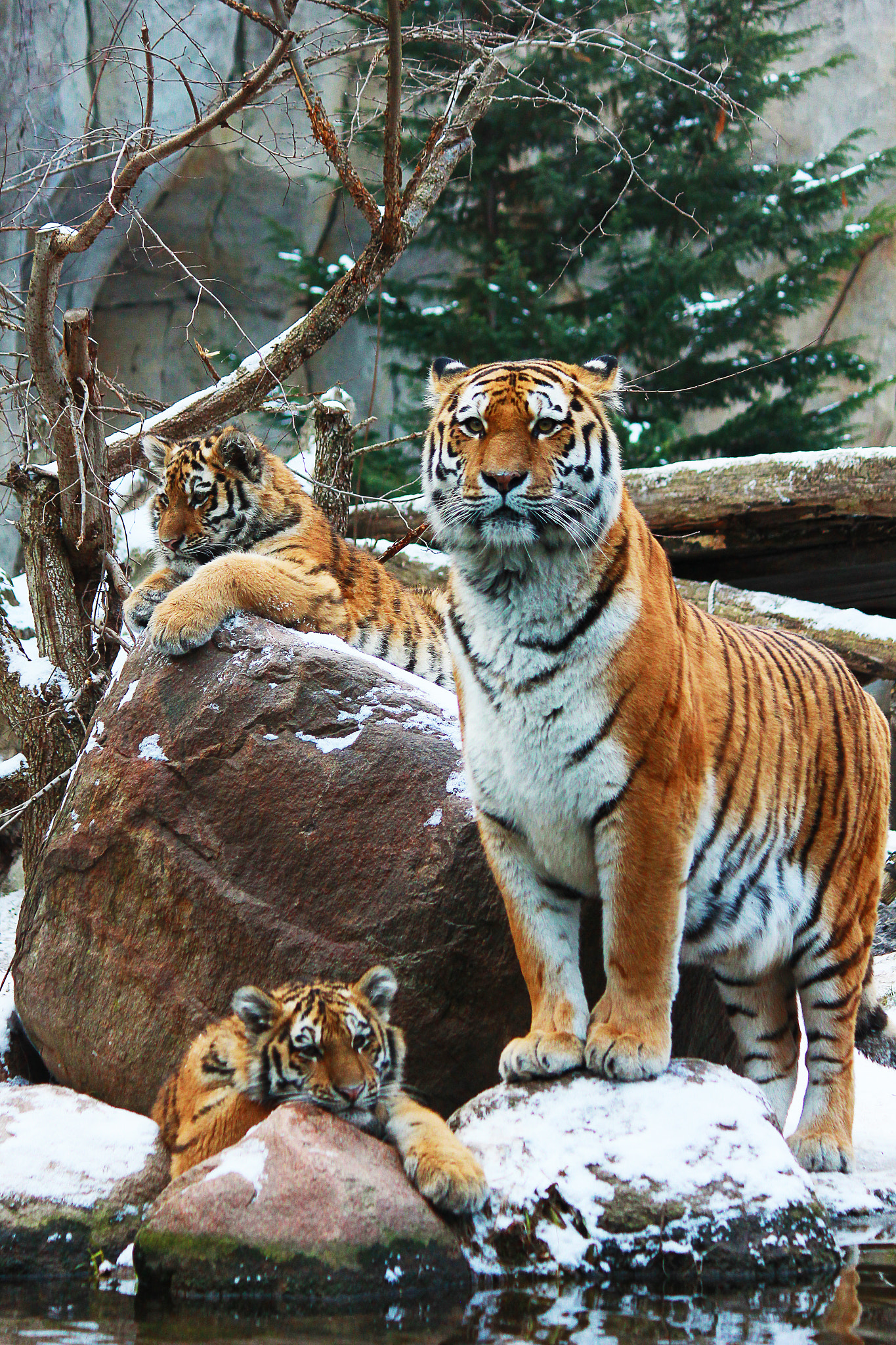
Tiger family

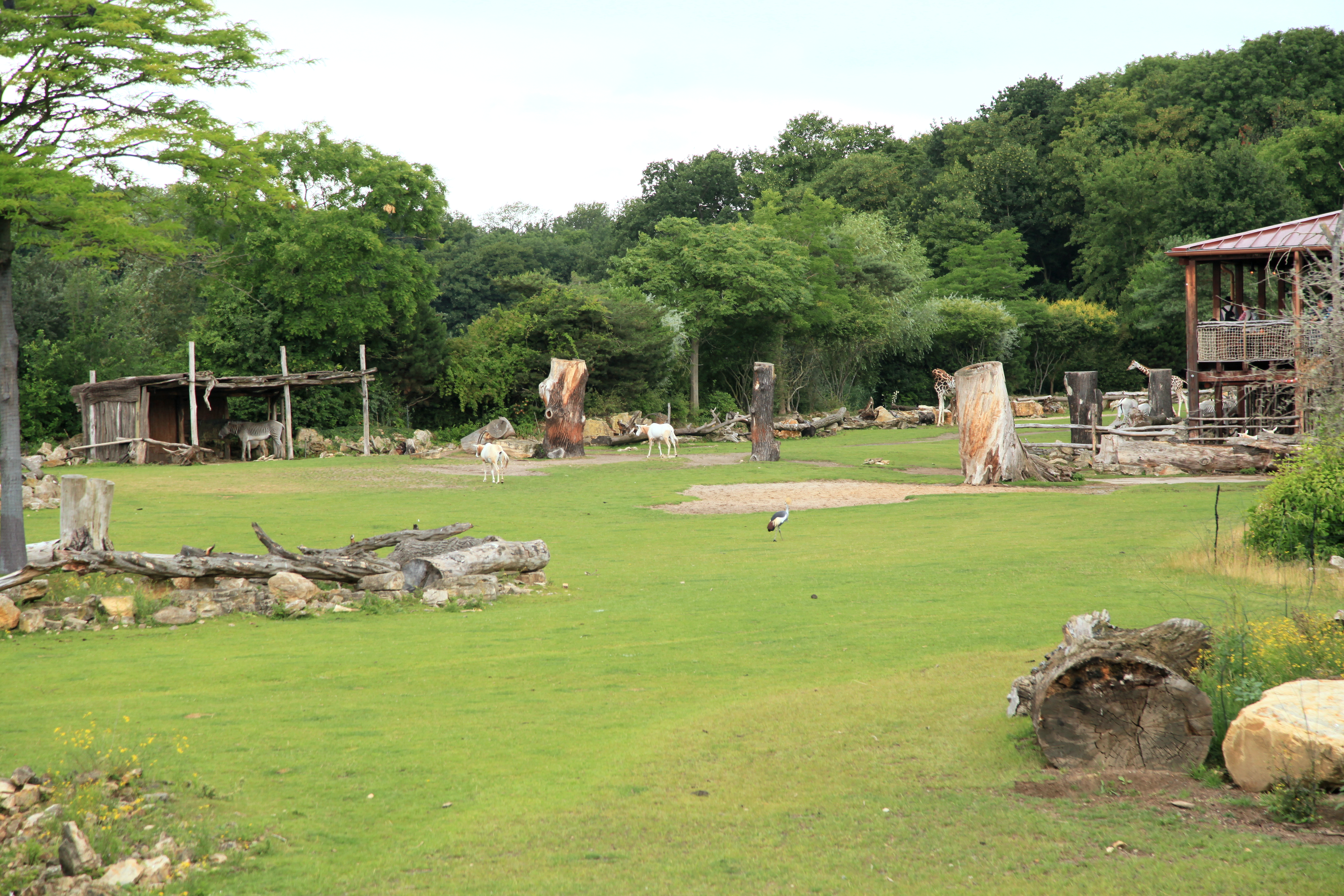
Kiwara Savanne with giraffe, zebra, oryx and crowned crane

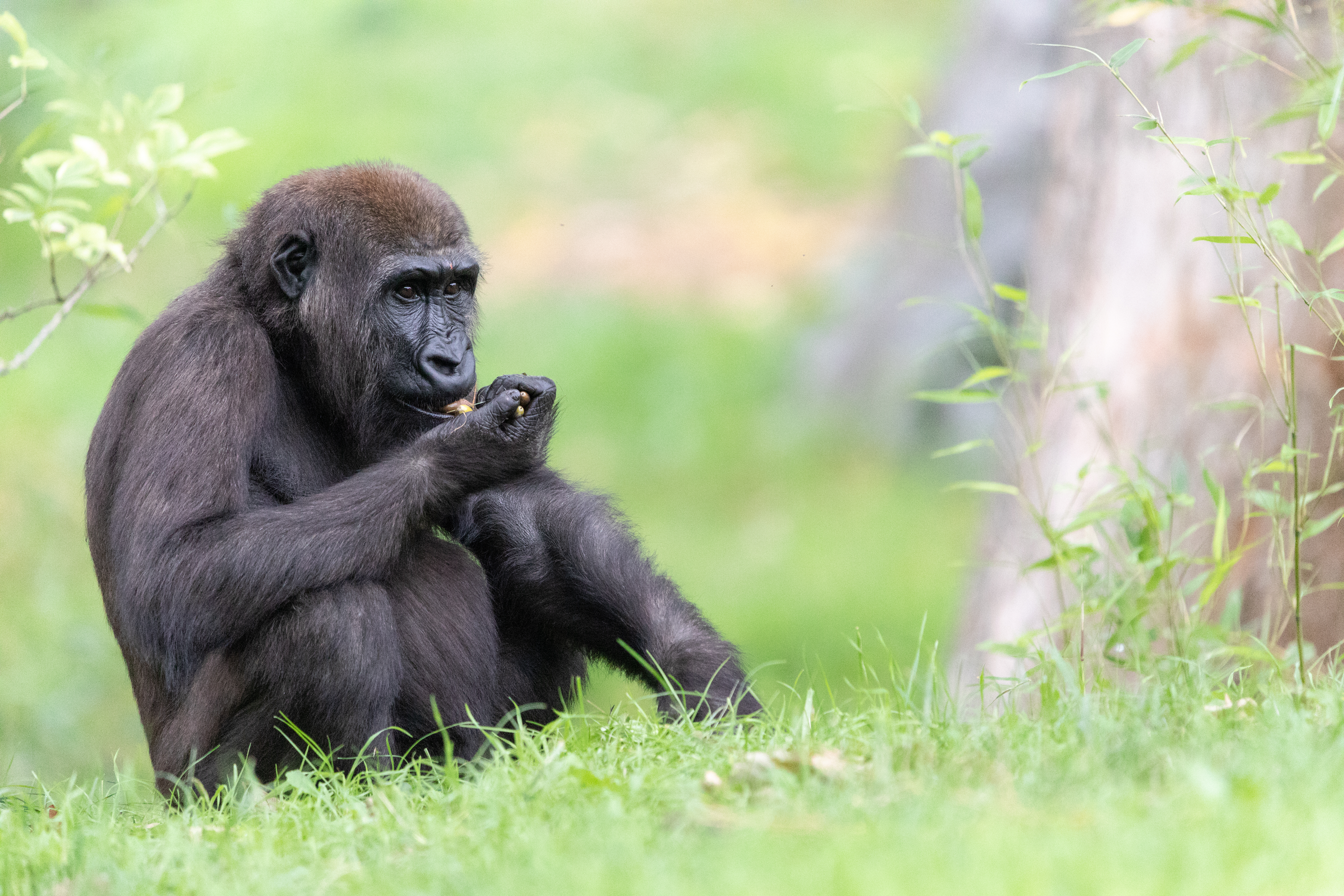
Young gorilla having lunch

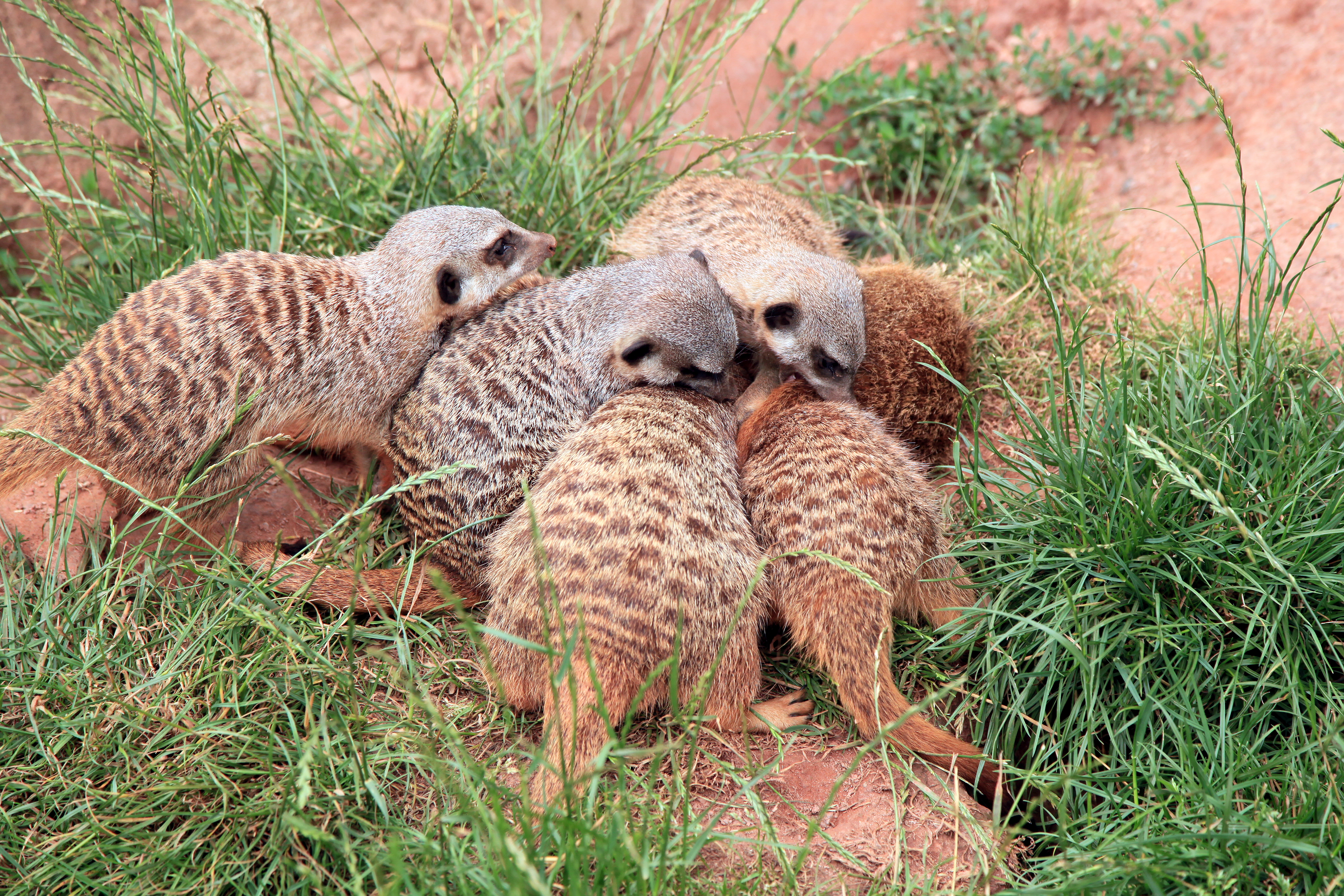
Meerkats

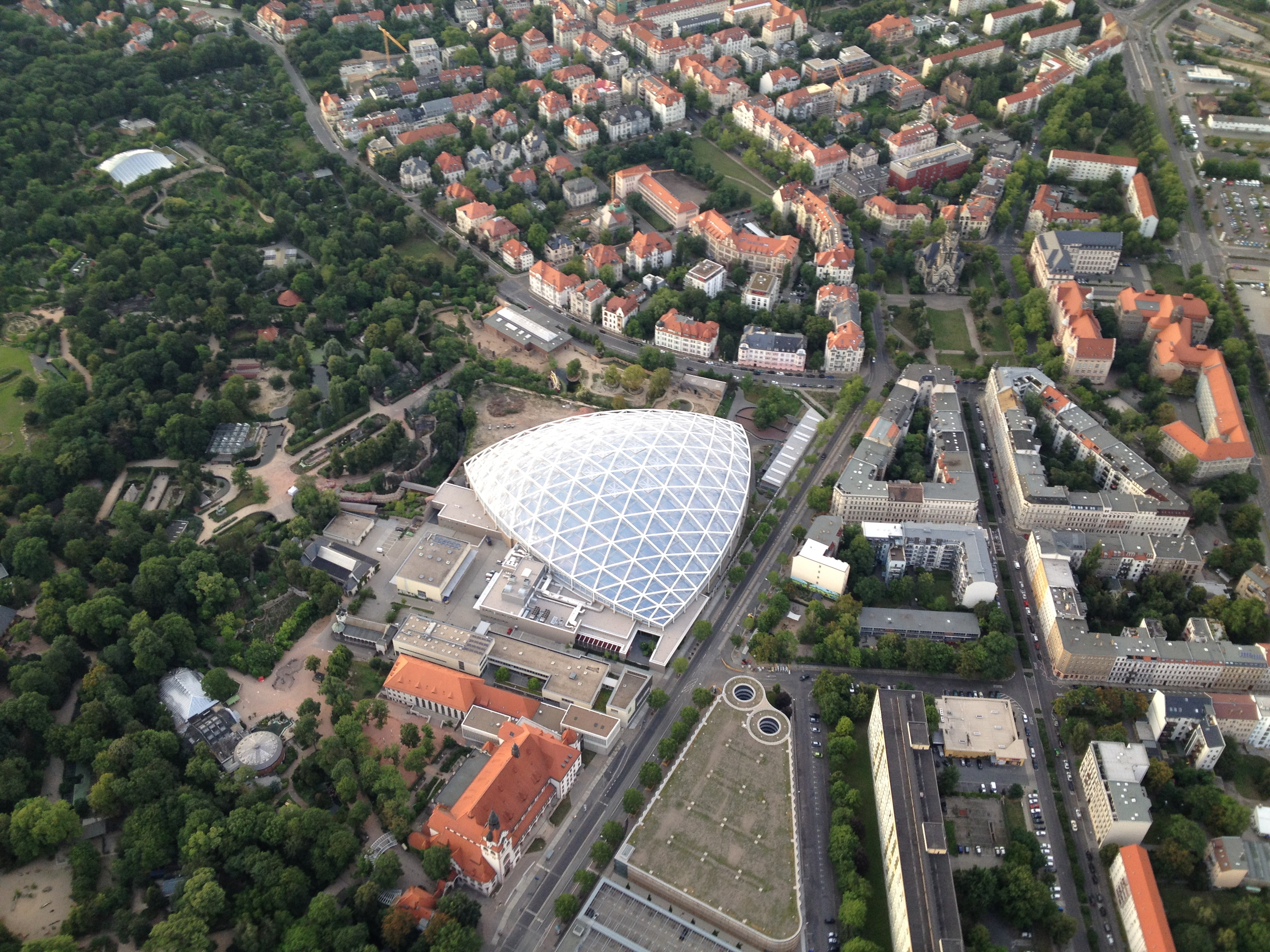
Gondwanaland from above (white hall)

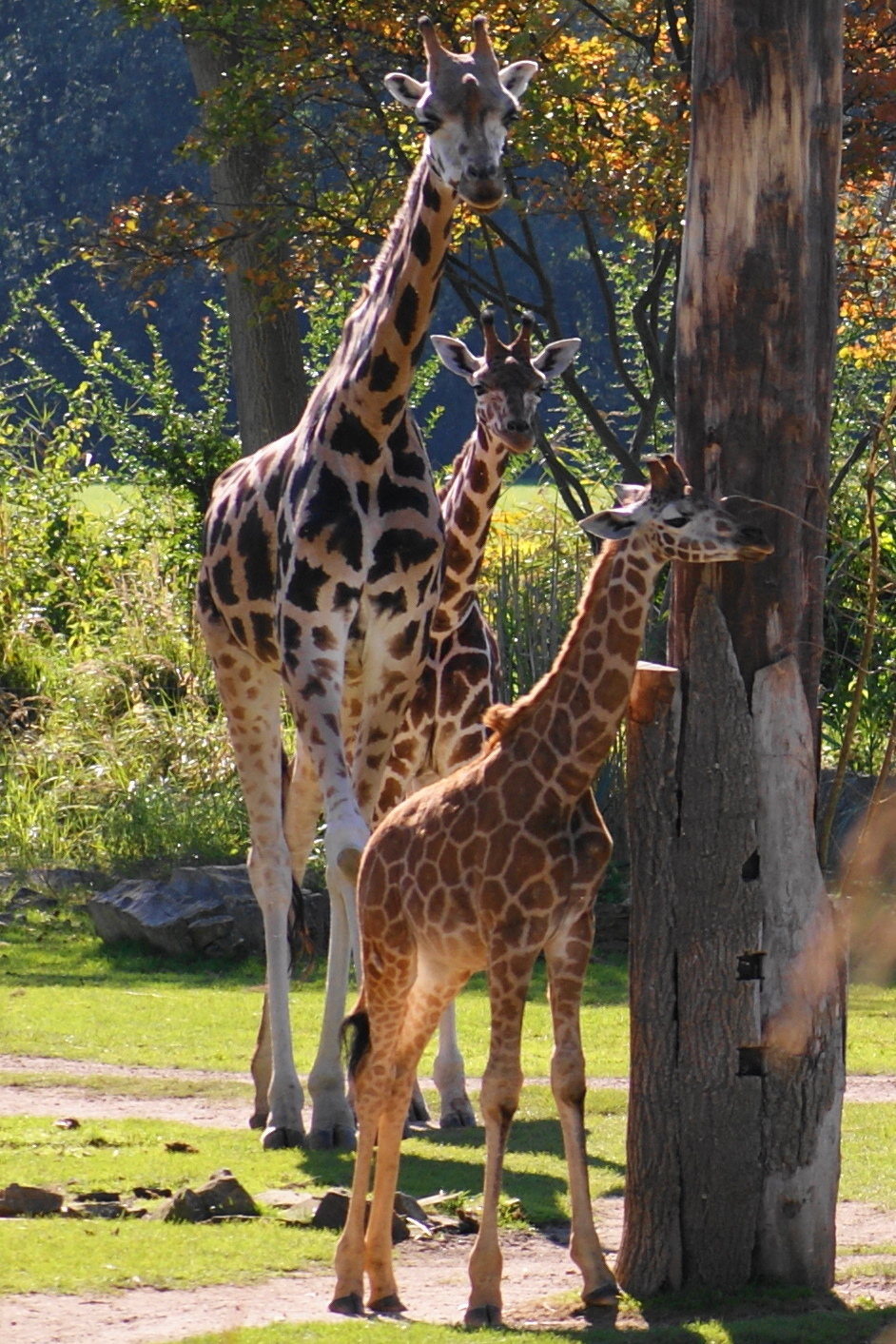
Giraffes

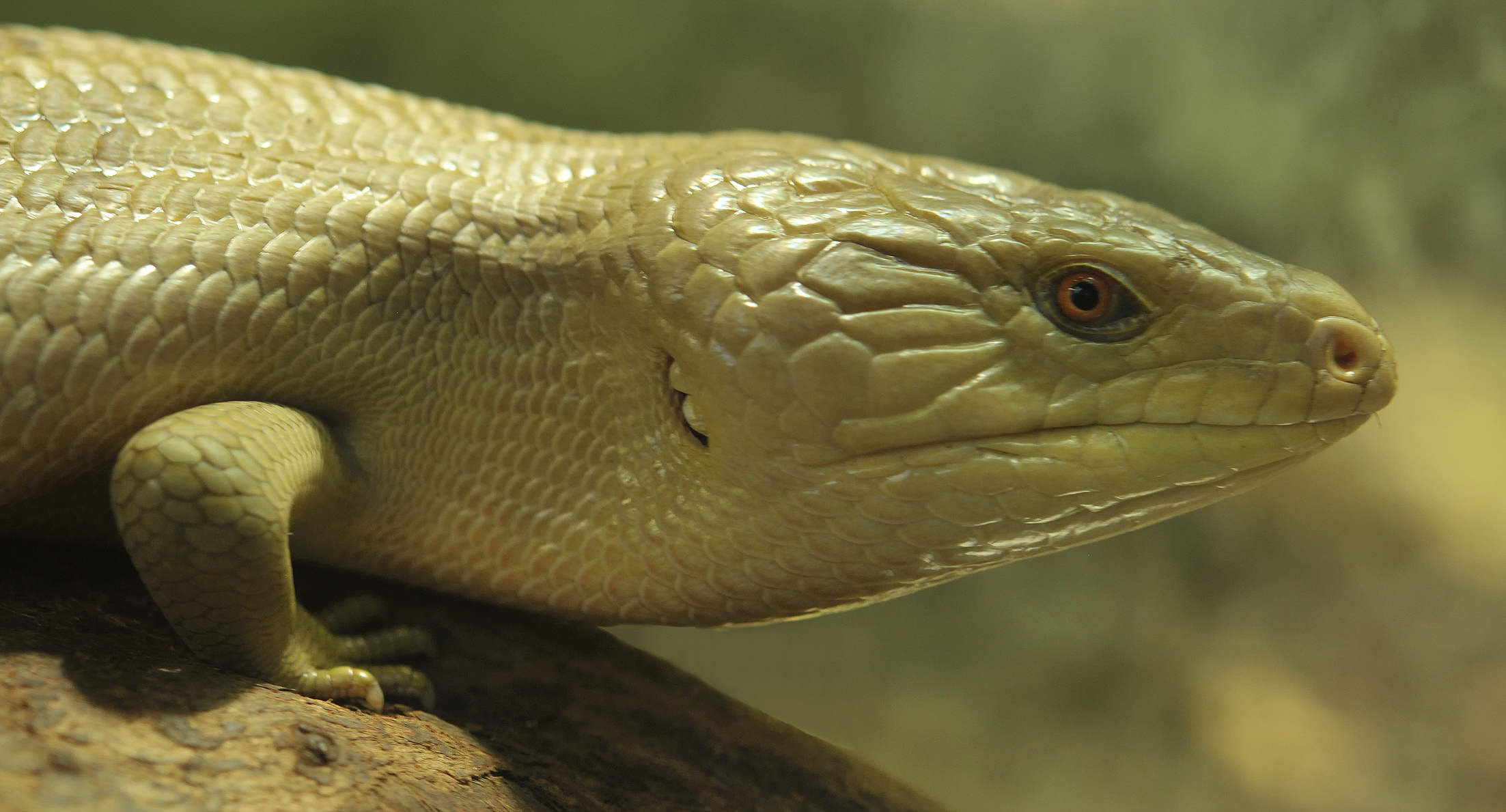
Eastern blue-tongued lizard in the terrarium
