= Blastema =

Mass of cells capable of enacting growth and regeneration

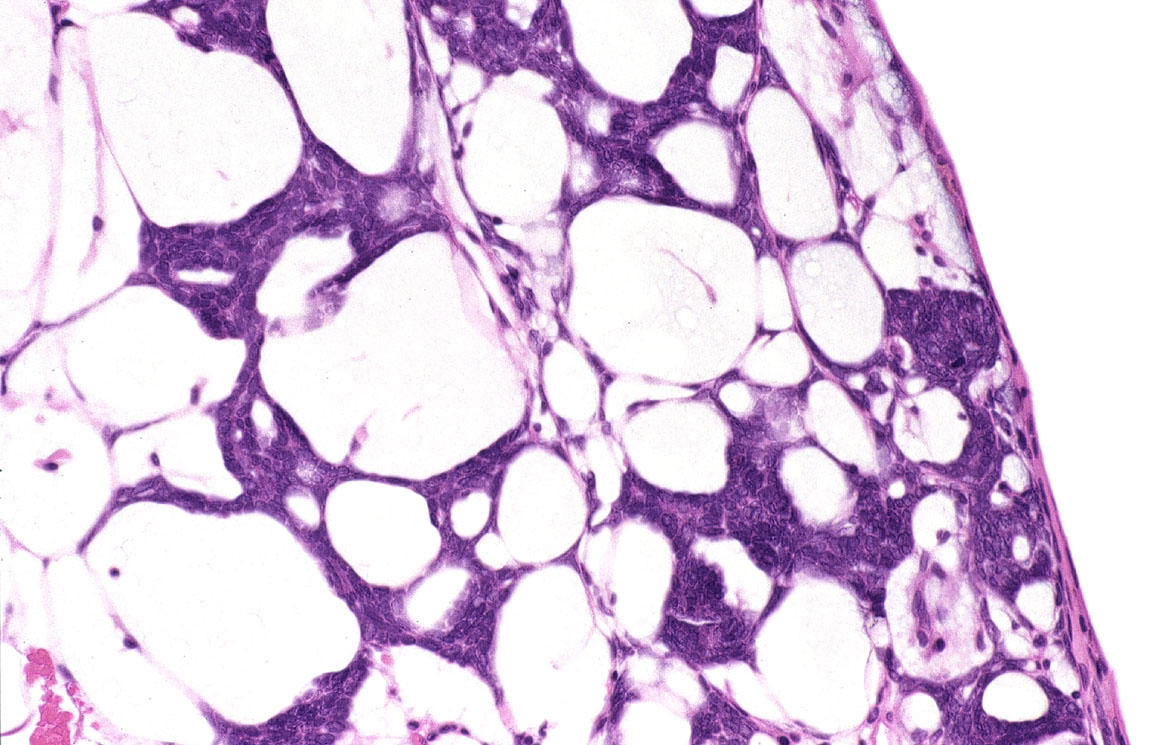
Blastema cells surrounded by transparent cystic spaces.

A blastema (Greek βλάστημα, "offspring") is a mass of cells capable of growth and regeneration into organs or body parts. The changing definition of the word "blastema" has been reviewed by Holland (2021).

== History ==
A broad survey of how blastema has been used over time brings to light a somewhat involved history. The word entered the biomedical vocabulary in 1799 to designate a sinister acellular slime that was the starting point for the growth of cancers, themselves, at the time, thought to be acellular, as reviewed by Hajdu (2011, Cancer 118: 1155–1168).

Then, during the early nineteenth century, the definition broadened to include growth zones (still considered acellular) in healthy, normally developing plant and animal embryos. Contemporaneously, cancer specialists dropped the term from their vocabulary, perhaps because they felt a term connoting a state of health and normalcy was not appropriate for describing a pathological condition.

During the middle decades of the nineteenth century, Schleiden and Schwann proposed the cell theory, and Remak and Virchow insisted that cells can only be generated by division of existing ones. Consequently, the conception of the blastema changed from acellular to cellular. More specifically, the term came to designate a population of embryonic cells that gave rise to a particular tissue.

In short, the term blastema started being used to refer to what modern embryologists increasingly began calling a rudiment or anlage (German for "foundation"). Importantly, the term blastema did not yet refer to a mass of undifferentiated-looking cells that accumulates relatively early in a regenerating body part. For instance, Morgan (1900), does not use the term even once in his classic book, "Regeneration."

It was not until the eve of World War 1 that Fritsch (1911, Zool. Jb. Zool. Physiol. 30: 377–472) introduced the term blastema in the modern sense, as now used by contemporary students of regeneration. Currently, the old usage of blastema to refer to a normal embryological rudiment has largely disappeared (except for describing aspects of development of the kidney and, to a lesser extent, the adrenal gland).

During the last century, blastemas were thought to be composed of undifferentiated pluripotent cells, but recent research indicates that in some organisms blastemas may retain memory of tissue origin. They are typically found in the early stages of an organism's development such as in embryos, and in the regeneration of tissues, organs and bone.

== Occurrence ==
Most animals do not produce blastemas as adults. Among those that can, limitations apply in terms of which organs are regenerated.

- Urodeles, i.e. the salamanders, can regenerate many organs after their amputation, including their limbs, tail, retina and intestine (& lens in newts).
- The adult zebrafish can regenerate its heart, brain, spinal cord, fins, and pancreas.
- Rodents (e.g. mouse, rat) and humans can regenerate their digit tips until the beginning of old age.
- Rabbits and some rodents close ear hole punches with a blastema.
- Dear antlers are regrown annually through a blastema.
- Planarian flatworms can regenerate their entire body.

Regeneration capability has a tendency to reduce as the animal matures. For example, the mouse can regenerate its heart and spinal cord until the seventh day of life; the frog can regenerate its tail and limb until metamorphisis. Regeneration capability correlates with an ability to heal skin without scarring.

== Salamander limb regeneration ==
When the limb of the salamander is cut off, a layer of epidermis covers the surface of the amputation site. In the first few days after the injury, this wounded epidermis transforms into a layer of signaling cells called the Apical Epithelial Cap (AEC), which has a vital role in regeneration. In the meantime, fibroblasts from the connective tissue migrate across the amputation surface to meet at the center of the wound. These fibroblasts multiply to form a blastema, the progenitor for a new limb.

An important model organism for studying limb regeneration is Ambystoma mexicanum (axolotl), a neotenic salamander with exceptional regenerative capabilities. Limb regeneration in these salamanders involves the blastema. Blastema cells, during limb regeneration, experience DNA double-strand breaks and thus require a form of DNA repair referred to as homologous recombination that deals with double-strand breaks. Additionally, blastema cells probably undergo epigenetic alterations during limb regeneration.

Salamander blastema cells can differentiate into any cell type with the exception of neurons. This means axons which are cut can be regrown by blastema cells, but if the soma of a neuron is damaged then a new neuron is unable to be created. As a result, neural organs cannot be regenerated.

=== Formation ===
In urodele amphibians, studies suggest that dedifferentiation of cells leads to the formation of a blastema that is able to form multiple tissue types after the amputation of their tails and wound healing occurs.

Urodeles use hedgehog for dorsal-ventral patterning of their regenerating tail and its surrounding tissue. This was suggested by its inhibition leading to reduced blastemas.

== Planarian flatworms ==
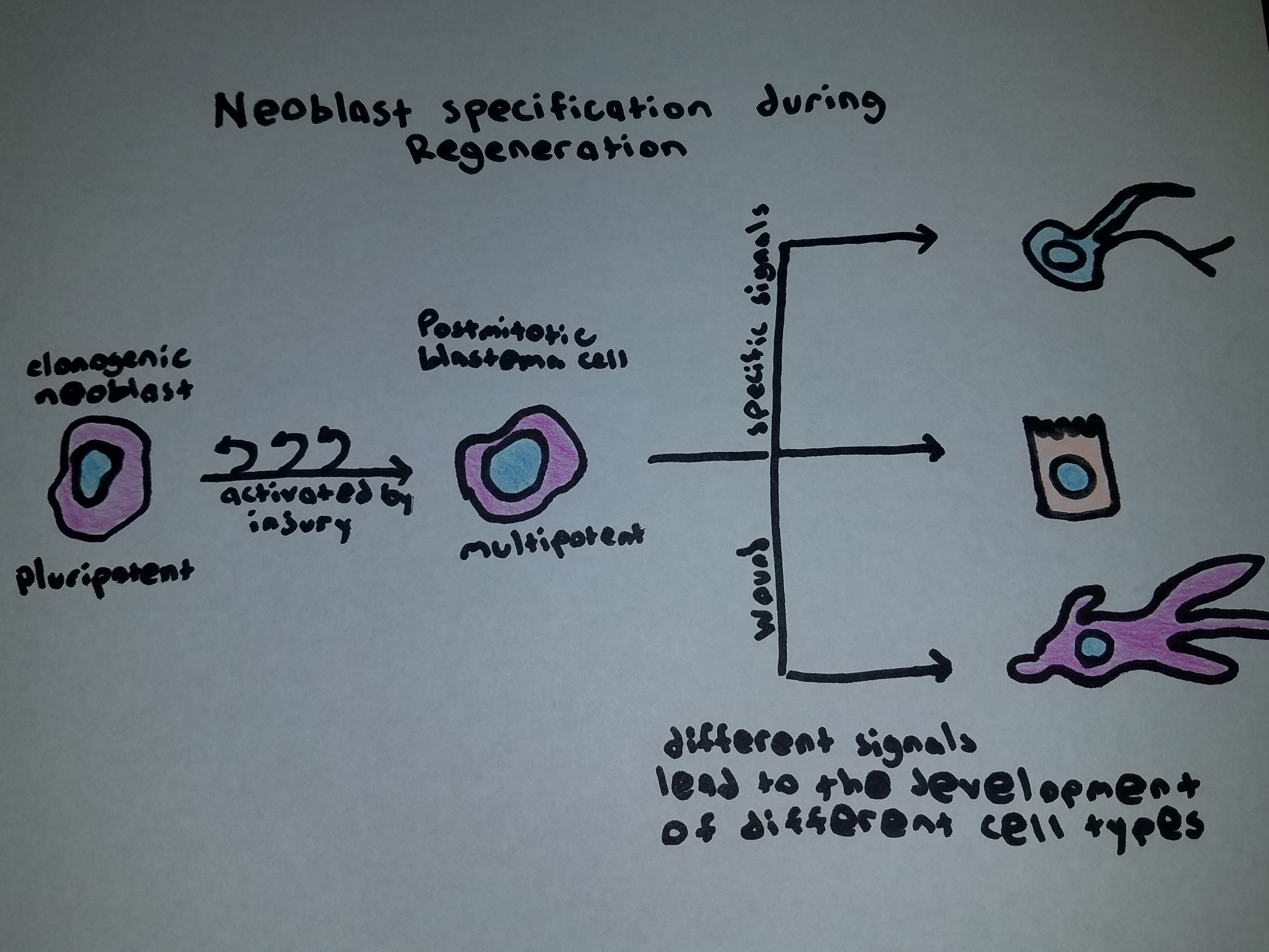
Neoblast specification during regeneration.

The planarian flatworms are noted for the ability to regenerate their entire body. This is enabled by a large population of pluripotent adult stem cells, the neoblasts. Flatworms use these undifferentiated cells for regeneration after paracrine factors can provide signals from the surface of the wound. The cells in the blastema are also referred to as clonogenic neoblasts (cNeoblasts) that are able to move to the site of the wound and reform the tissue.

Regeneration in planarians is controlled by intestinal cells. As these intestinal cells are not physically in contact with the neoblasts, it remains unclear how they guide these stem cells. Neoblasts are located between gut branches.

In these flatworms, RNA interference studies suggest that the gene Smad-beta-catenin-1 (a Wnt pathway effector) sets up the anterior-posterior axis after injury. Inhibitions to this results in reversed polarity across the blastema.

== Mammals ==
=== Digit tip ===
In rodents and humans, the digit tip (the part of the finger around the P3 bone element) can be cut off to the level of the fat pad and regenerated in a highly reproducible way. In such an amputation, the cut crosses the P3 bone, so that the wound consists of a central bony region (without exposing the proximal marrow) and a periphery of loose connective tissue mostly encircled by the nail epidermis. Unlike in other types of regeneration, the epidermis does not directly close over the amputated bone. Instead it constricts around the bone while upregulating osteoclast activity to dissolve the bone, so that the wound is closed over the eroded bone. This functionally causes an re-amputation.

Like in amphibians, epidermis is known to be important for mammalian (including human) fingertip regeneration. Nail stem cells, which is responsible for nail growth in normal conditions, appear to be responsible for blastema formation, with the Wnt pathway being indespensable for both nail growth and skeletal regeneration. In mice, the digit tip blastema consists of a population of quickly proliferating undifferentiated mesenchymal cells. Msx1 and Bmp4 (among other BMPs) are key factors.

== Zebrafish ==
In zebrafish, and in general, it seems as if experts are still uncertain of what truly forms the blastema. However, two common theories that have often been expressed are cell dedifferentiation and the recruitment of stem cells to the wound site.

Zebrafish seem to use IGF signalling in limb regeneration as its inhibition led to clues of them being required for blastema function.
