= Neoblast =

Planarian regeneration proliferative cells

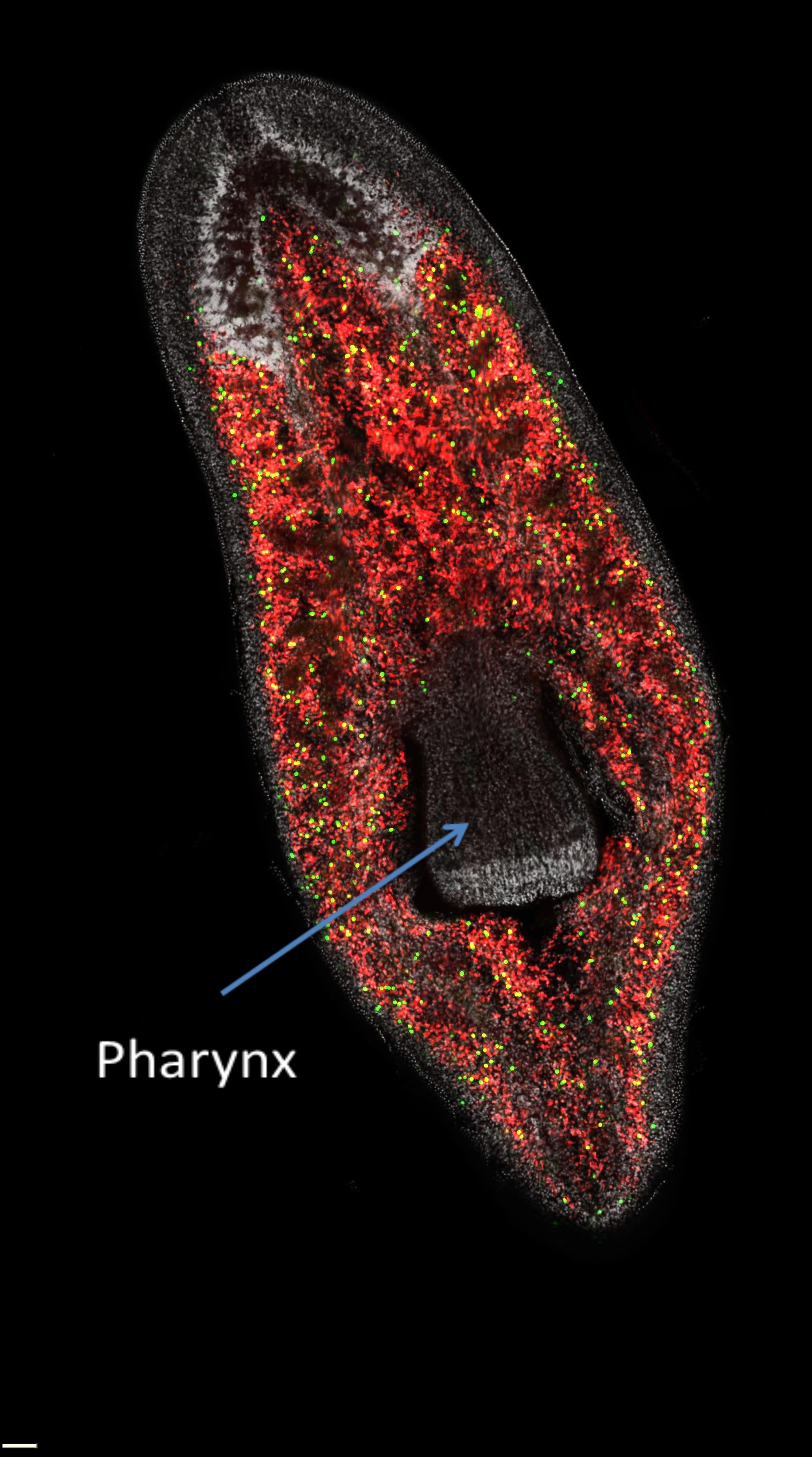
- Distribution of neoblasts in the planarian Schmidtea mediterranea. Neoblasts are found throughout the body, except for the pharynx (blue arrow) and the head tip. Neoblasts are labeled in red. Green labeling shows neoblasts in division.

Details
- Gives rise to: Blastema

Neoblasts (/ˈniːoʊˌblæst/) are adult stem cells found in planarian flatworms. They are the only dividing planarian cells, and they produce all cell types, including the germline. Neoblasts are abundant in the planarian parenchyma, and comprise up to 30 percent of all cells. Following injury, neoblasts rapidly divide and generate new cells, which allows planarians to regenerate any missing tissue.

== Characteristics ==
Neoblasts are somatic adult stem cells that are abundant in planarians. Morphologically, neoblasts are round and small, 5 to 10 μm, and have a large nucleus and scant cytoplasm. They are the only dividing planarian cells.

Neoblasts are found in the planarian parenchyma across the entire body, outside organ systems, intercalated between gut branches. The only regions that lack neoblasts completely are the pharynx and the head tip.

== Blastema formation ==
New cells produced by dividing neoblasts form the regenerating blastema. Hours following the injury, a wound response is initiated. The initial wound response is characterized by an increase in the number of cell divisions and by expression of injury-response genes. The expression of genes that are required for regenerating the specific damaged tissues is observed few days following the injury. The changes in gene expression are followed by the rapid growth of the blastema, and with emergence of new functional tissues.

During regeneration, stem cells appear in proximity to mmp-1^{+} secretory hecatonoblasts and porcupine^{+} intestinal cells. The hecatonoblasts are dispensable while the intestinal cells are required. Unusually, the intestinal cells do not tend to be in direct contact with the stem cells that they control (or have any cell-cell junctions), a control scheme unusual among invertebrate stem cells.

== Molecular characteristics ==
=== Components of chromatoid bodies ===
Neoblasts have chromatoid bodies, which are electronically dense structures composed of ribonucleoprotein complexes that are possibly responsible for maintaining neoblasts. Two protein components have been found within the chromatoid bodies DjCBC-1 and SpolTud-1, which are homologous to proteins involved in the proliferation of germline cells in other organisms.

=== Piwi and the interaction of small RNAs in neoblasts ===
The Argonaute Piwi sub-family of proteins and the small RNAs that interact with them are essential for germline cell development, cell turnover, epigenetic regulation, and repression of transposable elements. Neoblasts express three Piwi homologs, and expression of the Piwi homolog smedwi-1 is used to distinguish neoblasts from other somatic cells. The expression of two other Piwi homologs, smedwi-2 and smedwi-3, is essential for neoblasts. Inhibition of smedwi-2 or smedwi-3 gene expression blocks regeneration, impairs tissue maintenance and leads to death.

=== Neoblast specialization ===
The PIWI gene smedwi-1 is expressed by all neoblasts.

There are two distinct populations of neoblasts, called zeta and sigma. Zeta and sigma neoblasts are morphologically similar, but they are characterized by expression of different genes. Sigma neoblasts produce brain, intestine, muscle, excretory, pharynx, and eye cell types. They also lead to cells that become zeta neoblasts. Zeta neoblasts then develop the other epidermal cell types.

=== Signaling pathways affecting neoblasts ===
Wnt signaling pathway activity regulates the planarian anterior-posterior axis. Analysis of the gene Smed-betacatenin-1, encoding a Wnt pathway effector, has revealed its role in regulating the anterior-posterior axis. Smed-betacatenin-1 expression is required for producing tissues with posterior identity, and inhibition of Smed-betacatenin-1 expression results in animals regenerating anterior tissues (e.g., head) instead of posterior (e.g. tail). More generally, a variety of position control genes (PCGs) expressed by a layer of muscle cells under the epidermis tell the neoblasts where they are.

== History ==
Regeneration research using planarians began in the late 1800s and was popularized by T.H. Morgan at the beginning of the 20th century. Alejandro Sanchez-Alvarado and Philip Newmark transformed planarians into a model genetic organism in the beginning of the 20th century to study the molecular mechanisms underlying regeneration. Morgan found that a piece corresponding to 1/279th of a planarian or a fragment with as few as 10,000 cells could regenerate into a new worm within one to two weeks. Morgan also found that if both the head and the tail were cut off a flatworm the middle segment would regenerate a head from the former anterior end and a tail from the former posterior end.

Schmidtea mediterranea has emerged as the species of choice for research due to its diploid chromosomes and the existence of both asexual and sexual strains. Recent genetic screens utilizing double-stranded RNA technology have uncovered 240 genes that affect regeneration in S. mediterranea. Many of these genes have orthologs in the human genome.

== Application ==
The study of neoblasts helps uncover the mechanisms and functioning of stem cells and tissue degeneration. Planarians can regenerate any body part from small pieces in a few days and have many adult stem cells. They are easy to culture and grown to large populations. Their proteins are similar to human proteins. RNA interference is done by feeding, injecting, or soaking them in double-stranded RNA. The genome of Schmidtea mediterranea has been sequenced. In humans, no known pluripotent stem cells remain after birth.

A collaborative research community on planarian research, EuroPlanNet, was launched in May 2010.
