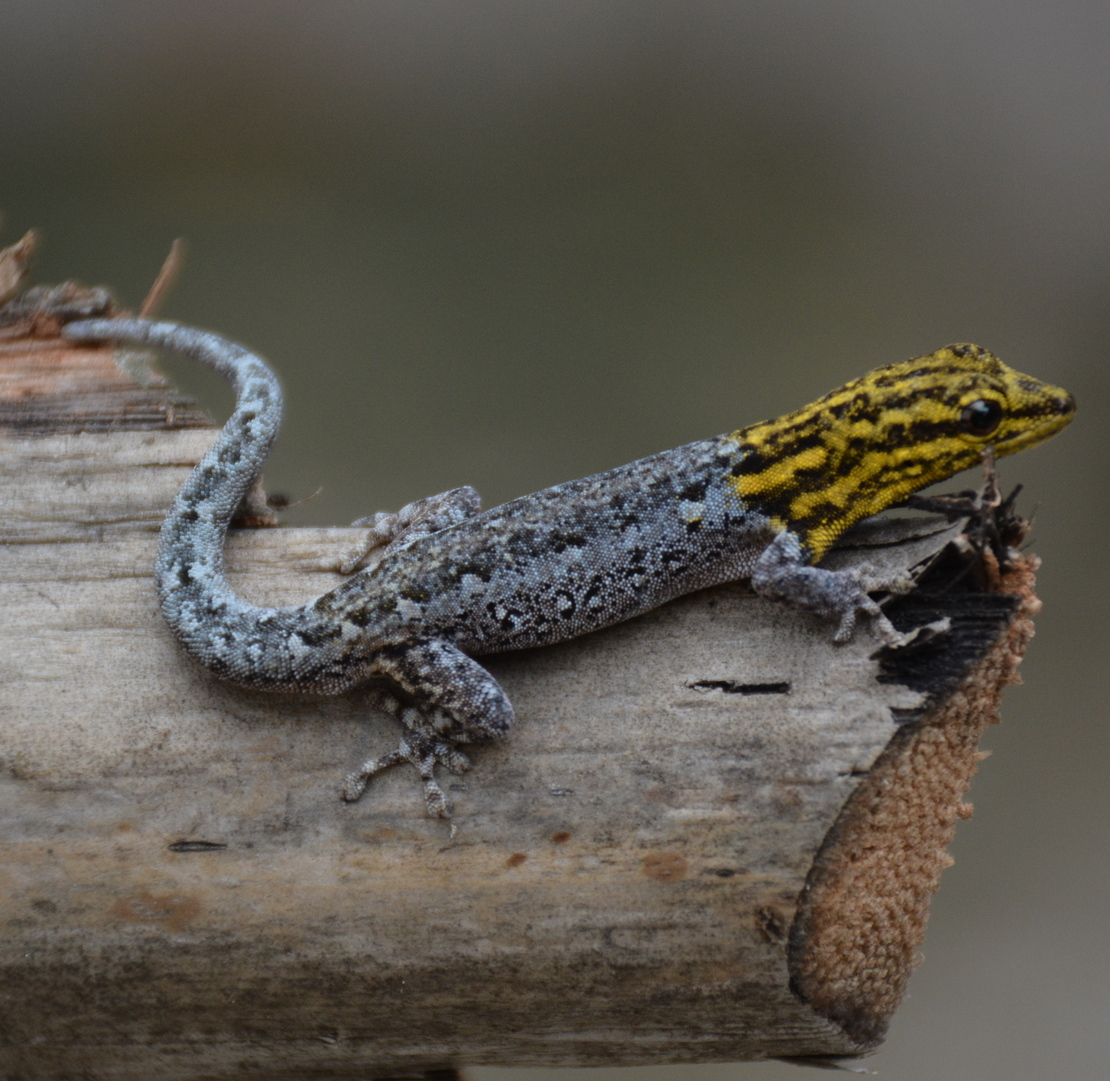

Conservation status
- Least Concern (IUCN 3.1)

Scientific classification
- Kingdom: Animalia
- Phylum: Chordata
- Class: Reptilia
- Order: Squamata
- Suborder: Gekkota
- Family: Gekkonidae
- Genus: Lygodactylus
- Species: L. picturatus

Binomial name
- Lygodactylus picturatus (Peters, 1871)

Synonyms
- Hemidactylus picturatus Peters, 1871

= White-headed dwarf gecko =

Species of lizard

The white-headed dwarf gecko or painted dwarf gecko (Lygodactylus picturatus) is a species of Lygodactylus gecko widely distributed in Africa.

One subspecies is recognized, in addition to the nominate one: Lygodactylus picturatus sudanensis Loveridge, 1935, the Sudani dwarf gecko. The species Lygodactylus luteopicturatus was synonymized with L. picturatus in 2004.

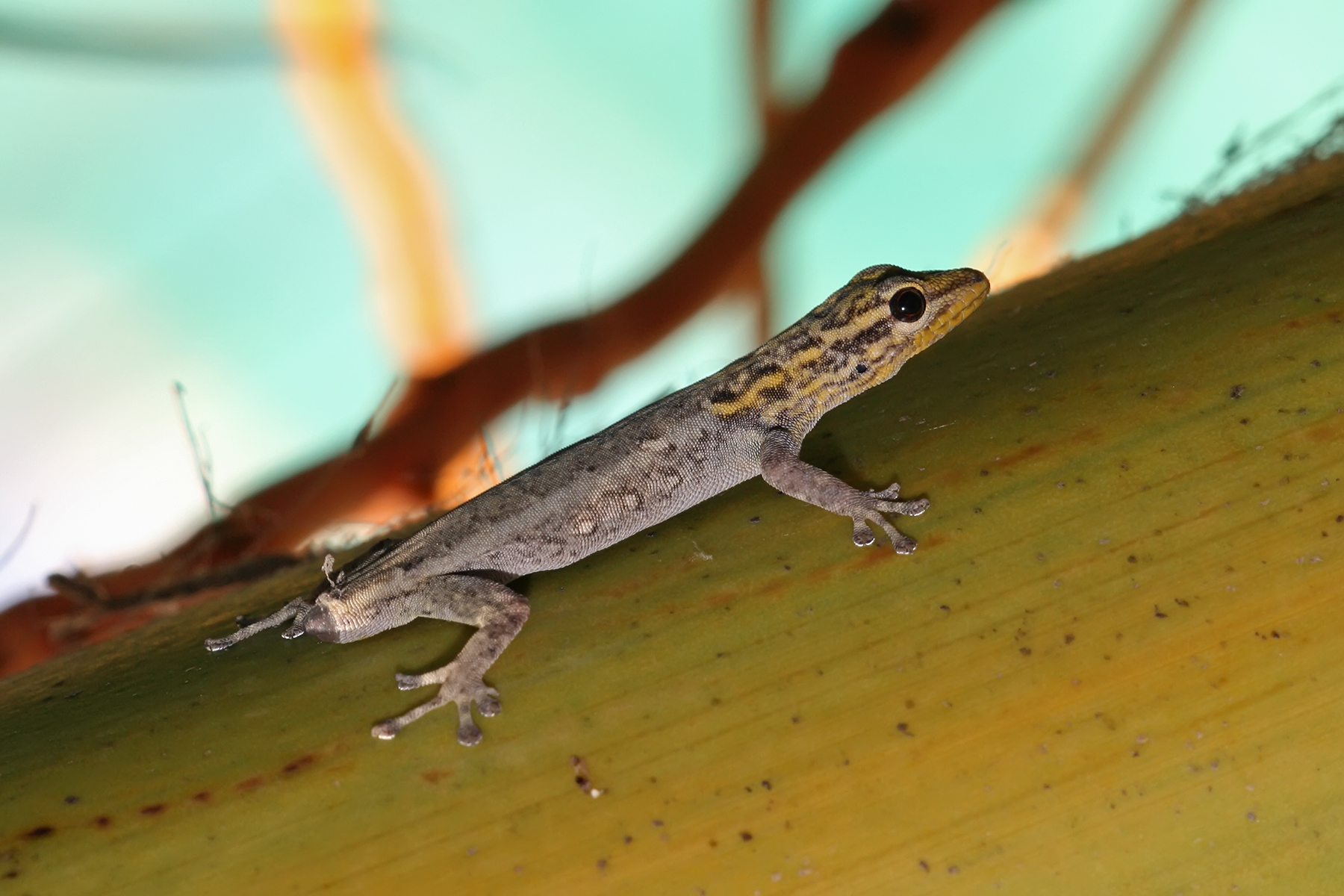
White-headed dwarf gecko in Dar es Salaam, Tanzania. The tail has been lost due to a self-defense mechanism known as autotomy.
