= Phillip Newmark =

American biologist

Philip A. Newmark
- Scientific career
- Workplaces: University of Wisconsin–Madison

Philip A. Newmark is an American biologist, focusing in developmental biology and parasitology, currently at Howard Hughes Medical Institute and University of Wisconsin and an Elected Fellow of the American Association for the Advancement of Science.

Newmark received a BA in biology from Boston University and his PhD from University of Colorado, Boulder.
