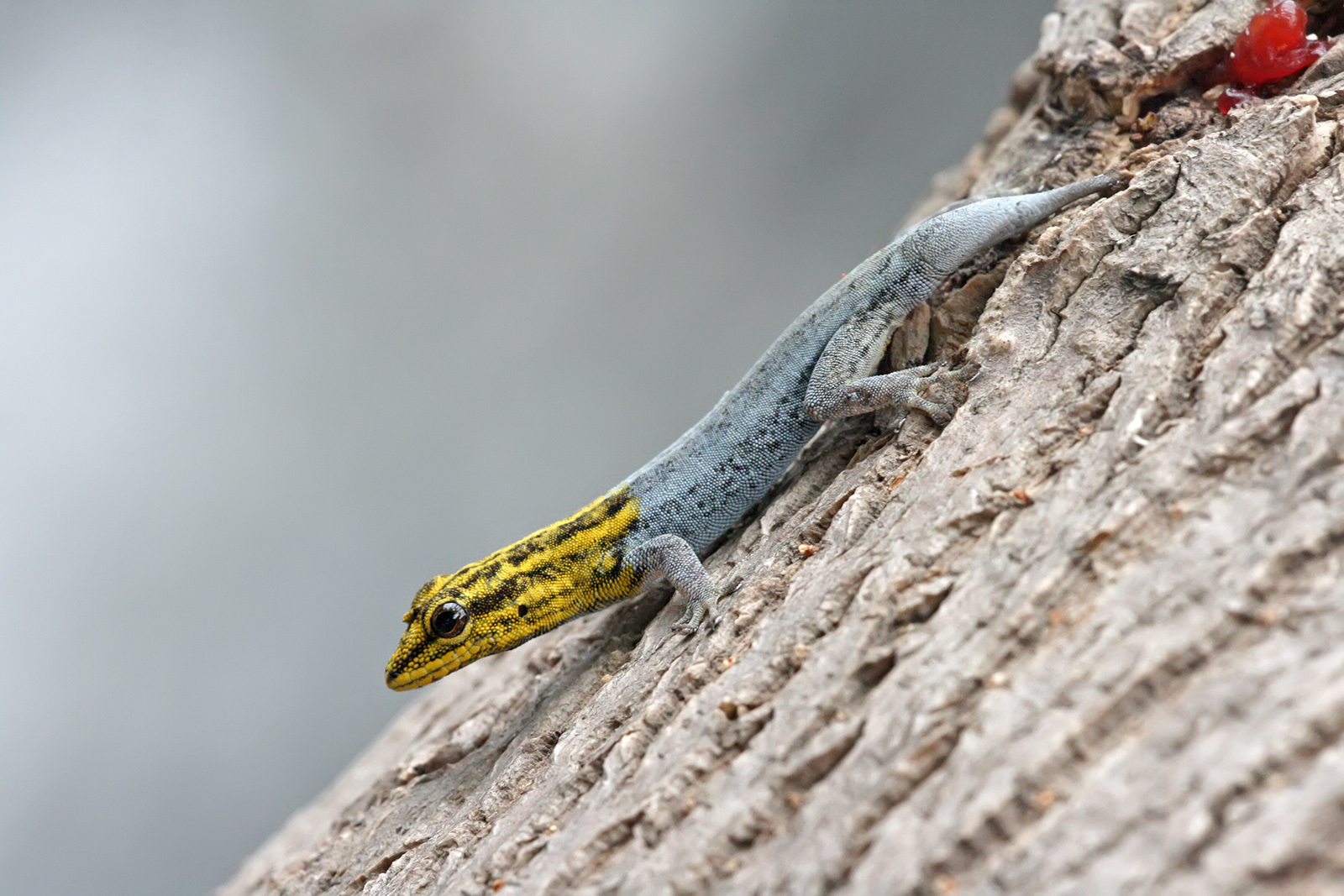
- In Dar es Salaam, Tanzania

Scientific classification
- Kingdom: Animalia
- Phylum: Chordata
- Class: Reptilia
- Order: Squamata
- Suborder: Gekkota
- Family: Gekkonidae
- Genus: Lygodactylus
- Species: L. luteopicturatus

Binomial name
- Lygodactylus luteopicturatus Pasteur, 1964

Subspecies
- L. l. zanzibaritis Pasteur, 1964; L. l. luteopicturatus Pasteur, 1964

= Dwarf yellow-headed gecko =

Yellow-headed dwarf gecko

Species of lizard

The yellow-headed dwarf gecko or dwarf yellow-headed gecko (Lygodactylus luteopicturatus) is a small species of dwarf gecko found in the rocky areas of southern Kenya, Somalia (maybe as an introduced species), eastern Tanzania, and Zanzibar. It can grow up to 90 millimetres (3.5 in), but on average attains a length of 80 millimetres (3.1 in) with a snout-vent (body) length of 39 millimetres (1.5 in). The tail length can be equal to the length of the body from snout to the anus (SVL or Snout-Vent Length).

In 2004, the species was synonymized with Lygodactylus picturatus.

The yellow-headed dwarf gecko has a defense mechanism called tail autotomy, where they drop their tails to flee to safety when they are attacked by a predator. However, tail autotomy only gives the gecko an immediate benefit to escape because an autotomized gecko is slower without its tail and has difficulty running on vertical surfaces. Eggs can be found in places that are secure from predators.
