= Rēkohu shelduck =

Conservation status
- Extinct (c.1500)

Scientific classification
- Kingdom: Animalia
- Phylum: Chordata
- Class: Aves
- Order: Anseriformes
- Family: Anatidae
- Genus: Tadorna
- Species: †T. rekohu

Binomial name
- †Tadorna rekohu (Rawlence et al., 2025)

Extinct species of bird

The Rēkohu shelduck (Tadorna rekohu) is an extinct species of shelduck that was endemic to the Chatham Islands, and was closely related to the paradise shelduck of New Zealand. It went extinct after settlement by Moriori c. 1500.
