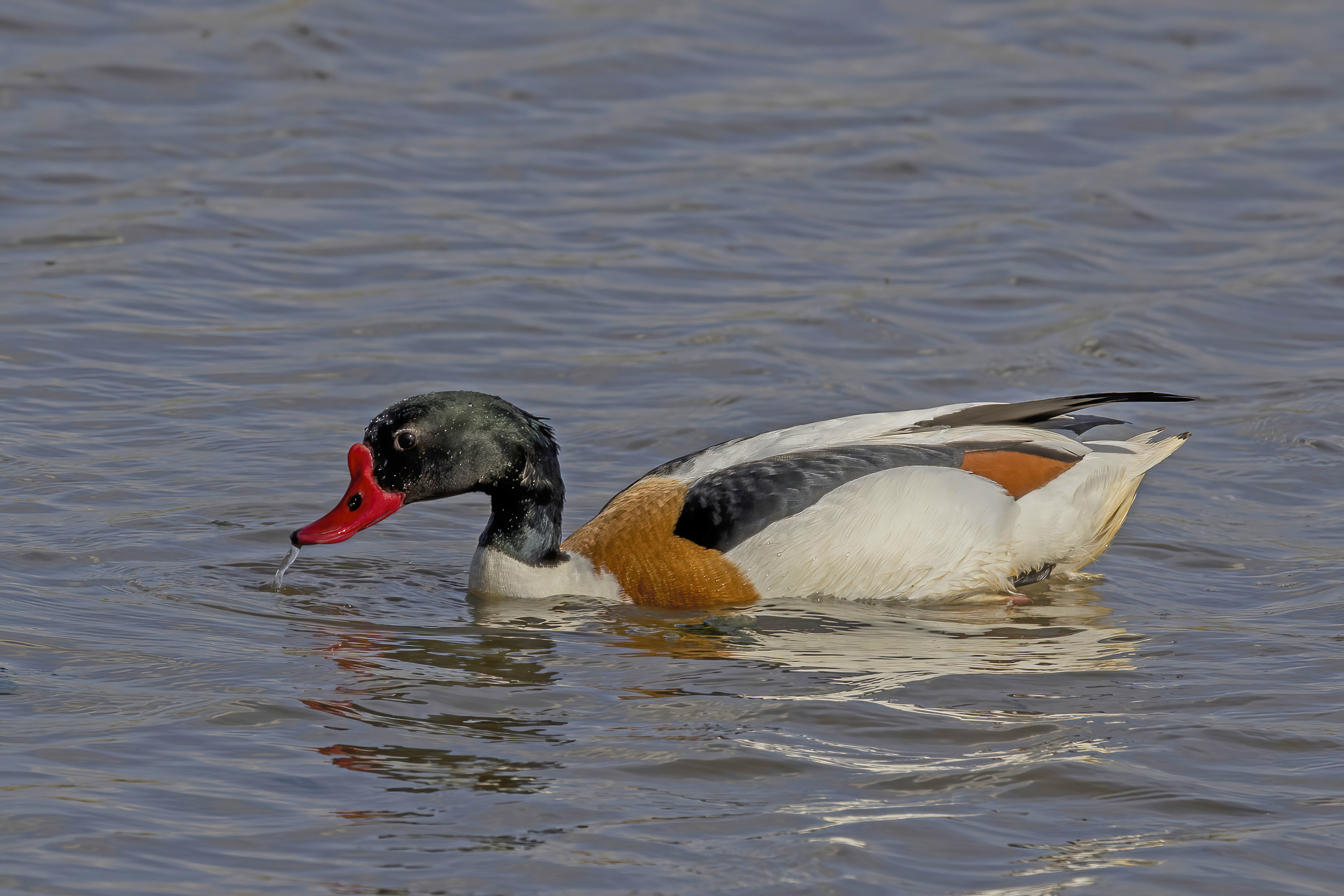
- Male common shelduck

Scientific classification
- Kingdom: Animalia
- Phylum: Chordata
- Class: Aves
- Order: Anseriformes
- Family: Anatidae
- Subfamily: Anatinae
- Genus: Tadorna; F. Boie, 1822

Type species
- Tadorna familiaris F. Boie, 1822 = Anas tadorna Linnaeus, 1758 Boie, 1822

Species
- T. ferruginea T. cana T. tadornoides T. variegata T. cristata T. tadorna

Synonyms
- see text

= Tadorna =

Shelducks

Genus of birds

The shelducks, most species of which are found in the genus Tadorna (except for the Radjah shelduck, which is now found in its own monotypic genus Radjah), are a group of large birds in the tribe Tadornini of the Anatidae, the biological family that includes the ducks and most duck-like waterfowl such as the geese and swans.

== Biology ==
Shelducks are a group of large, often semiterrestrial waterfowl, traditionally seen as intermediate between geese and ducks, but now known to be significantly more closely related to ducks than to geese or swans, forming a clade that is sister to all other ducks. They are medium-sized (from 55–70 cm) Old World waterfowl. The sexes are slightly differently coloured in most species, and all have a characteristic upperwing pattern in flight, with the secondary remiges forming an iridescent green speculum, the primaries black, and the coverts (forewing) white. Their diet consists of small shore animals (winkles, crabs, etc.), as well as grasses and other plants.

They were originally known as "sheldrakes", which remained the most common name until the late 19th century, with 'sheld' meaning variegated. Other archaic names include bergander, burrow-duck, and vulpanser, the last meaning "fox goose". The word "sheldrake" is still sometimes used to refer to a male shelduck.

== Systematics ==
The genus Tadorna was introduced by German zoologist Friedrich Boie in 1822. The type species is the common shelduck. The genus name comes from the French name Tadorne for the common shelduck. It may originally derive from Celtic roots meaning "pied waterfowl", essentially the same as the English "shelduck". A group of them is called a "dopping", taken from the Harley Manuscript.

Tadorna is very closely related to the genus Alopochen, which includes the Egyptian goose and its extinct relatives from the Madagascar region, and slightly less closely related to the genus Radjah, which includes the radjah shelduck. While the classical shelducks form a group that is obviously monophyletic, the interrelationships of these, the aberrant common and especially Radjah sheducks, and the Egyptian goose were found to be poorly resolved by mtDNA cytochrome b sequence data; this genus may thus be paraphyletic. A 2018 analysis clarified some of the interrelationships, but did not include all the species, notably not common shelduck, and likewise a 2025 study which did not include Alopochen or Radjah.

- Common shelduck (Tadorna tadorna)
- † Crested shelduck (T. cristata) - probably extinct (mid-20th century?)
- South African shelduck (T. cana)
- Ruddy shelduck (T. ferruginea)
- Paradise shelduck (T. variegata)
- † Rēkohu shelduck (T. rekohu) - Chatham Islands, extinct (post-16th century)
- Australian shelduck (T. tadornoides)

Fossil bones from Dorkovo (Bulgaria) described as Balcanas pliocaenica may actually belong to this genus. They have even been proposed to be referable to the common shelduck, but their Early Pliocene age makes this rather unlikely.

=== Table of species ===
The following table is based on the Avilist checklist.

Genus Tadorna – F. Boie, 1822 – five species
Common name	Scientific name and subspecies	Range	Size and ecology	IUCN status and estimated population
Common shelduck Male Female	Tadorna tadorna (Linnaeus, 1758)	Europe, Asia, North Africa	Size: Habitat: Diet:	LC
Crested shelduck	Tadorna cristata (Kuroda, 1917)	Eastern Russia, northeast Asia	Size: Habitat: Diet:	CR Probably extinct
South African shelduck Male Female	Tadorna cana (Gmelin, JF, 1789)	Namibia, Botswana, South Africa	Size: Habitat: Diet:	LC
Ruddy shelduck Male Female	Tadorna ferruginea (Pallas, 1764)	Europe, Asia, North Africa	Size: Habitat: Diet:	LC
Paradise shelduck Male Female	Tadorna variegata (Gmelin, 1789)	New Zealand	Size: Habitat: Diet:	LC
Australian shelduck Male Female	Tadorna tadornoides (Jardine & Selby, 1828)	Australia, New Zealand	Size: Habitat: Diet:	LC
