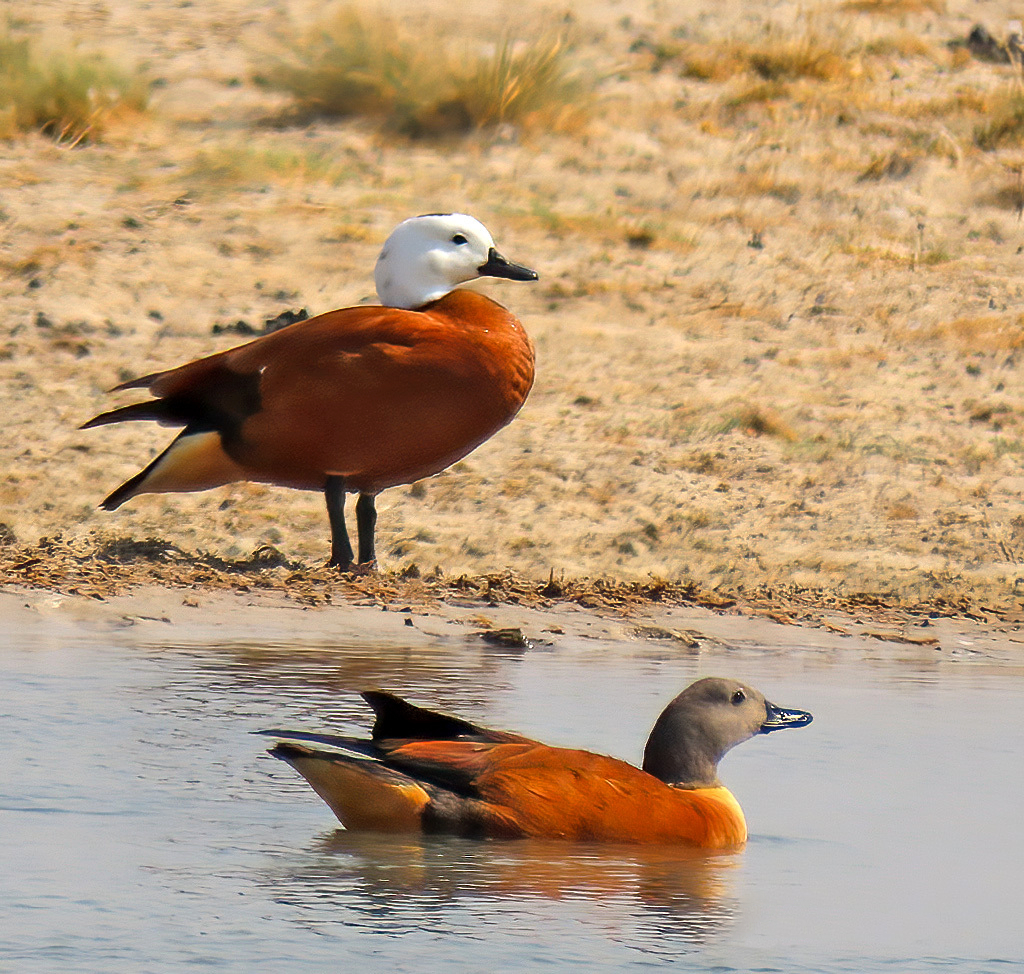
- Adults; female above, male below; Etosha National Park

Conservation status
- Least Concern (IUCN 3.1)

Scientific classification
- Kingdom: Animalia
- Phylum: Chordata
- Class: Aves
- Order: Anseriformes
- Family: Anatidae
- Genus: Tadorna
- Species: T. cana

Binomial name
- Tadorna cana (Gmelin, JF, 1789)
- IUCN distribution of the South African shelduck Extant (resident)

= South African shelduck =

Species of bird

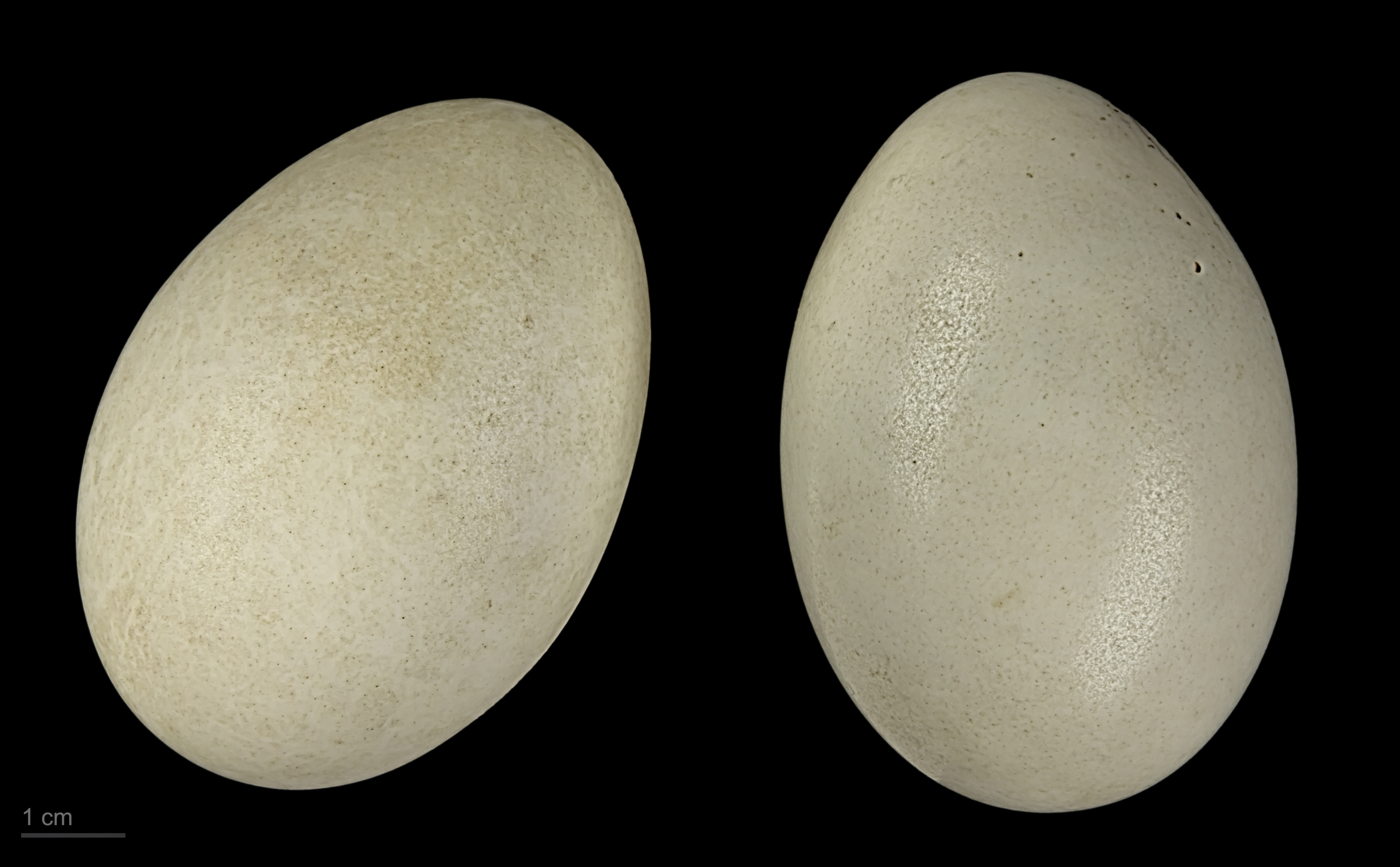
Tadorna cana egg, MHNT.

The South African shelduck or Cape shelduck (Tadorna cana) is a species of shelduck, a group of large goose-like birds in the bird family Anatidae, which includes the swans, geese and ducks. This is a common species native to southern Africa.

This is a 64 cm (25 in) long bird which breeds mainly in Namibia and South Africa. In the austral winter, many birds move north-east from the breeding range to favoured moulting grounds, where sizable concentrations occur.

This species is mainly associated with lakes and rivers in fairly open country, breeding in disused mammal holes, usually those of the aardvark. Pairs tend to be very nomadic when not in breeding season.

== Taxonomy ==
The South African shelduck was formally described in 1789 by the German naturalist Johann Friedrich Gmelin in his revised and expanded edition of Carl Linnaeus's Systema Naturae. He placed it with all the other geese, ducks and swans in the genus Anas and coined the binomial name Anas cana. Gmelin based his description on the "Grey-headed goose" from the Cape of Good Hope that the English ornithologist John Latham had described in 1785 in his A General Synopsis of Birds. The South African shelduck is now placed with five other species in the genus Tadorna that was described by the German zoologist Friedrich Boie in 1822. The genus name comes from the French name Tadorne for the common shelduck. The specific epithet cana is from Latin canus meaning "grey". The species is monotypic; no subspecies are recognised.

== Description ==
Adult South African shelducks have ruddy bodies and wings strikingly marked with black, white and green. The male has a grey head, and the female has a white face and black crown, nape and neck sides. In flight they can be hard to distinguish from Egyptian geese. Juveniles are duller in appearance. Young females lack the white on the head, excluding white eye circles. The colour on the females head is highly variable, with the extent of white increasing with age, and can become almost fully white-headed. Males make a deep honk or hoogh call while the female tends to produce a louder, sharper hark.

South African shelduck is one of the species to which the Agreement on the Conservation of African-Eurasian Migratory Waterbirds (AEWA) applies.

=== Gallery ===
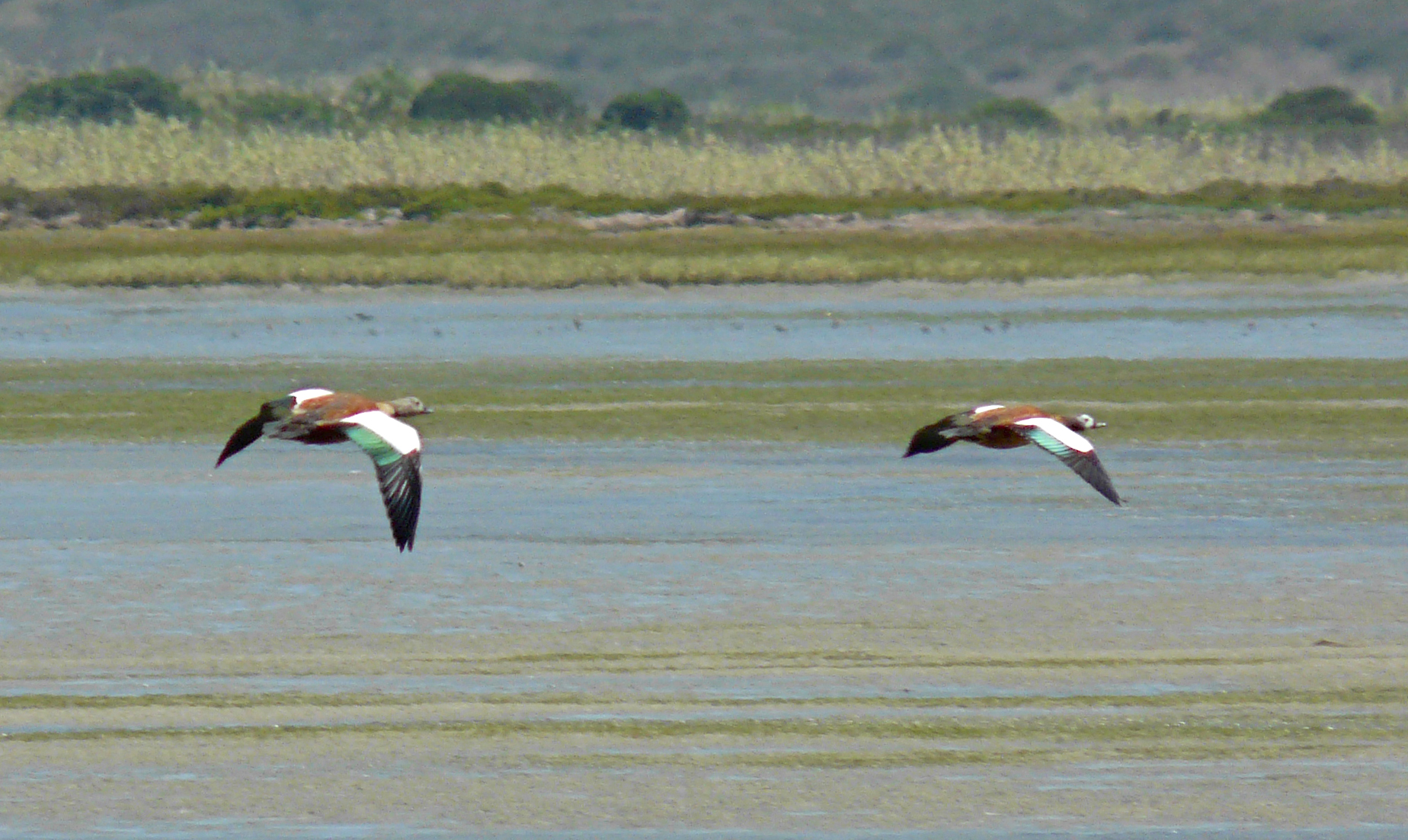
Pair in flight showing the extensive white wing patches and iridescent green speculum; Hopefield, Western Cape, South Africa

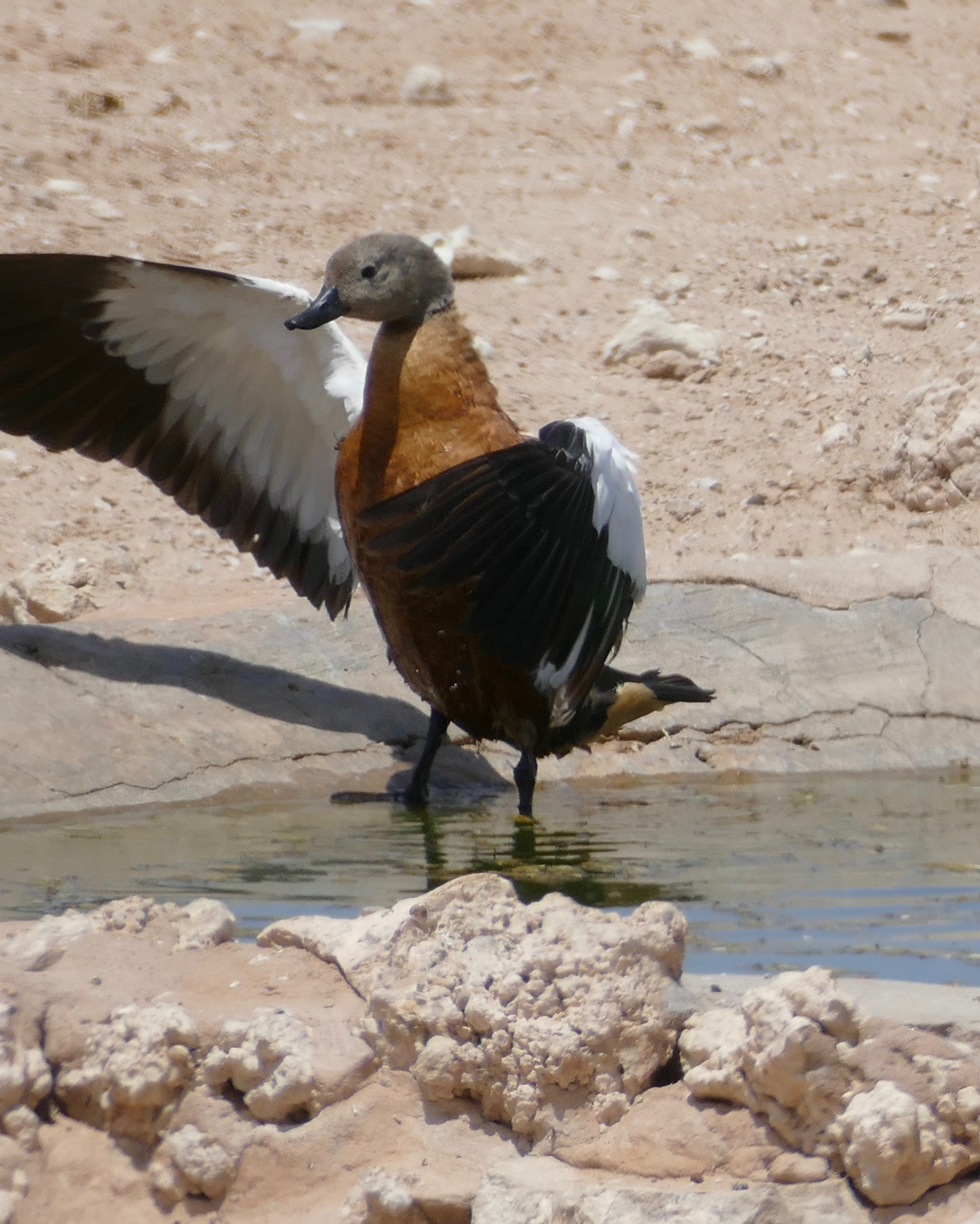
Male, with grey head; Kgalagadi Transfrontier Park, Northern Cape, South Africa

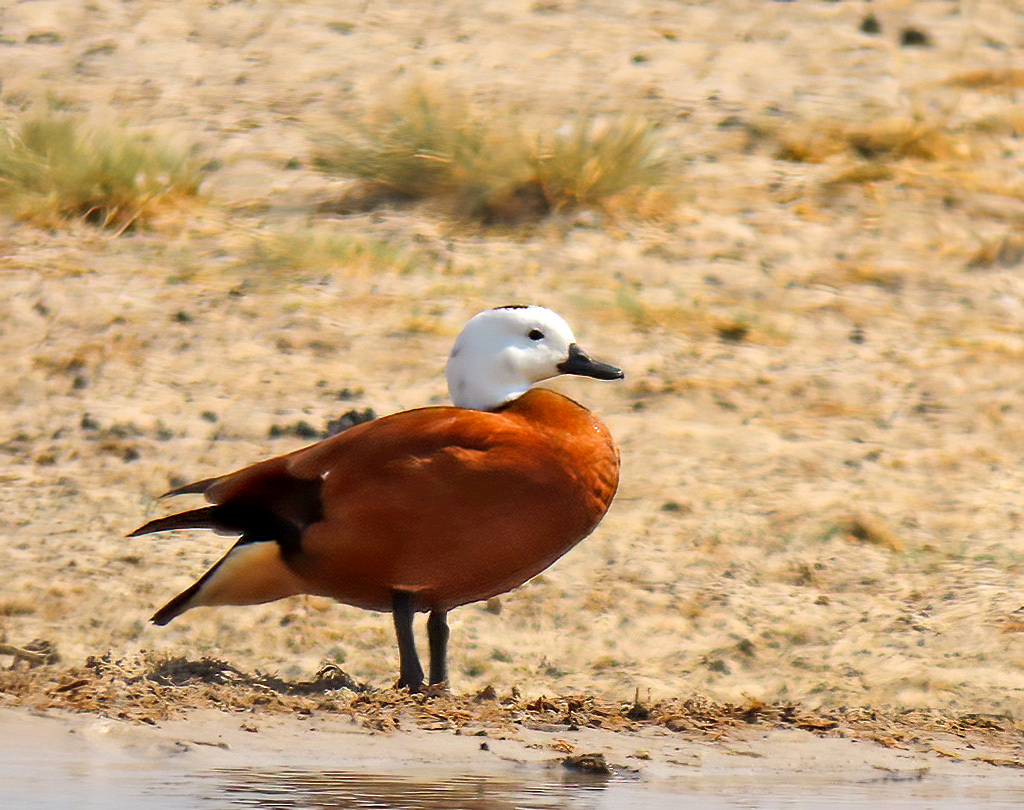
Female with extensive white on the head; Etosha National Park, Namibia

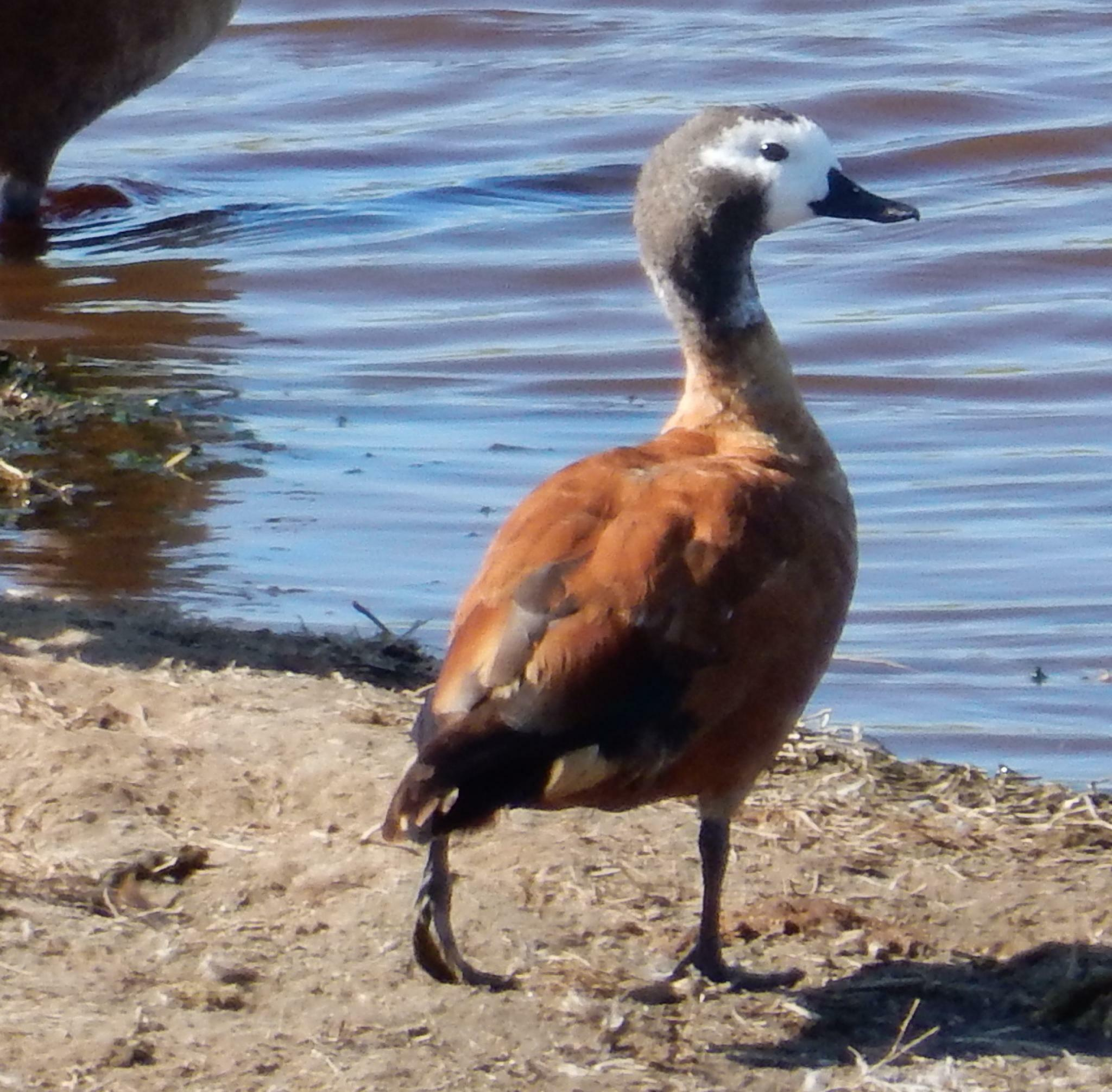
Younger female with less extensive white on the head; Cannon Rocks, Eastern Cape, South Africa

== Captivity ==
In common with the other orange-plumaged shelducks like ruddy shelduck, it is popular in zoos and duck collections; hybrids with these other species in captivity are frequent and are problematic to identify.
