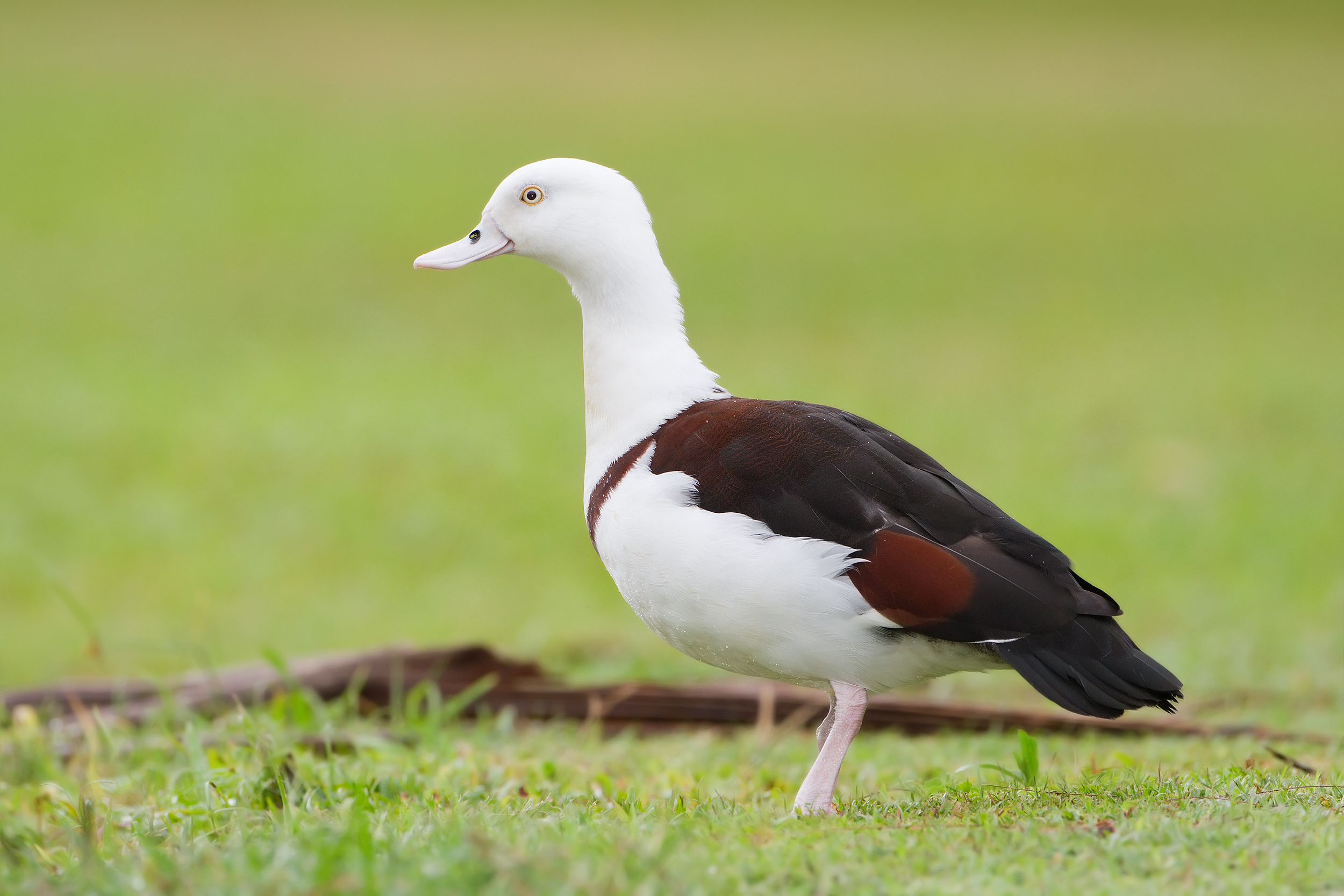
- At Centenary Lakes, Cairns, Queensland
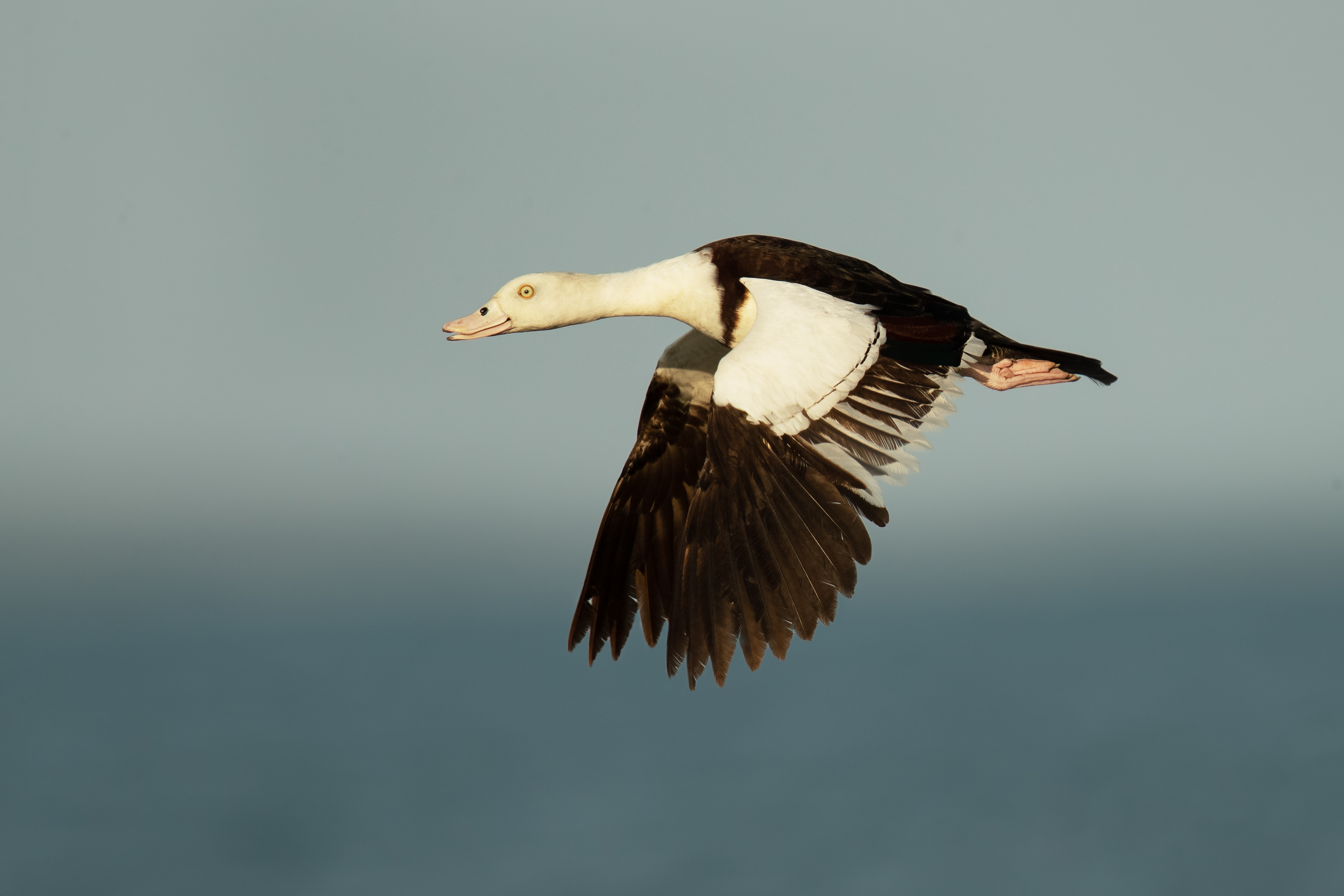
- At Lee Point, Darwin, Northern Territory

Conservation status
- Least Concern (IUCN 3.1)

Scientific classification
- Kingdom: Animalia
- Phylum: Chordata
- Class: Aves
- Order: Anseriformes
- Family: Anatidae
- Genus: Radjah; Reichenbach, 1853
- Species: R. radjah

Binomial name
- Radjah radjah (Garnot & Lesson, RP, 1828)

Subspecies
- R. r. radjah (Lesson, RP, 1828); R. r. rufitergum (Hartert, 1905)
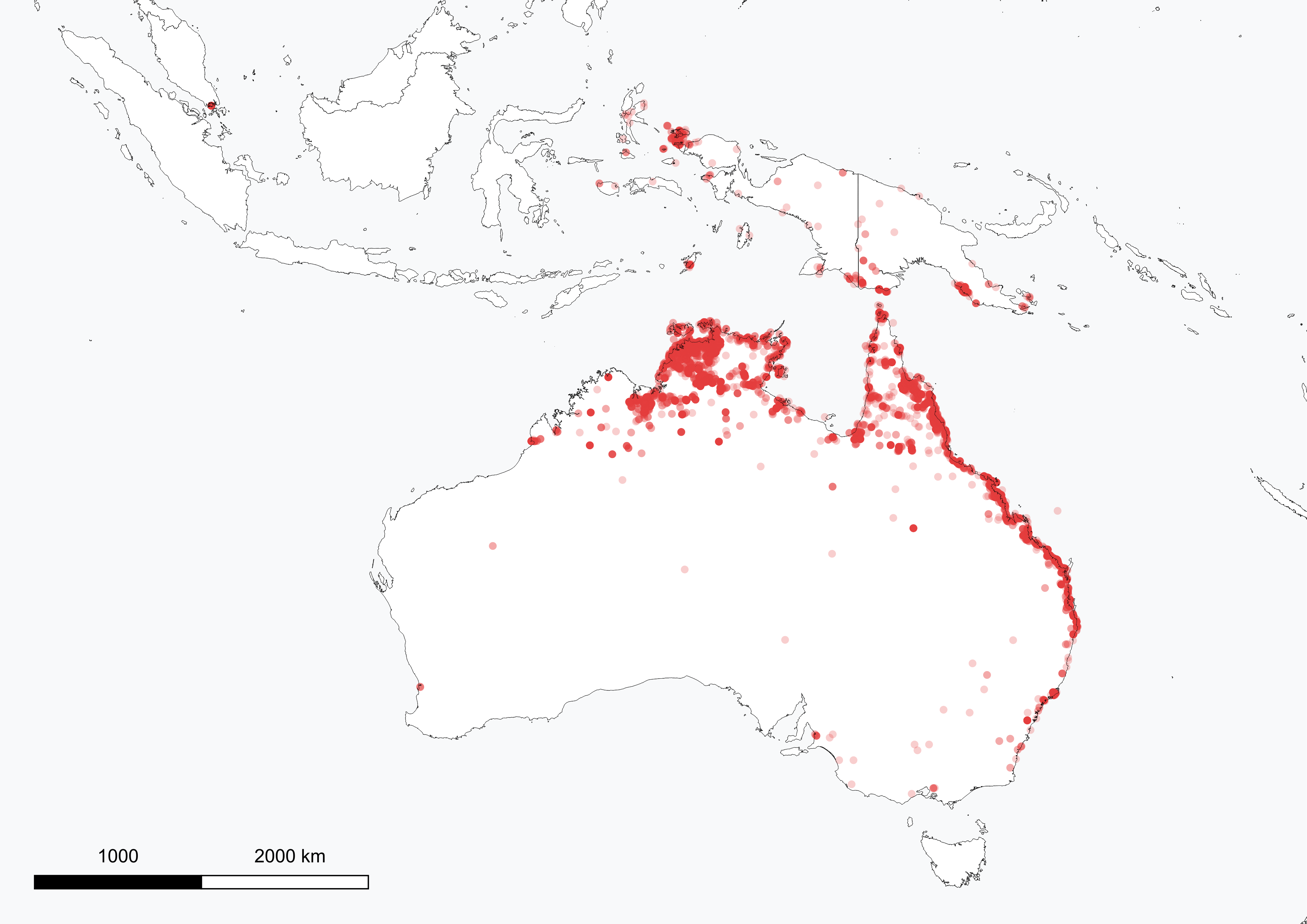
- Species distribution

Synonyms
- Tadorna radjah

= Radjah shelduck =

Species of bird

The radjah shelduck (Radjah radjah) is a species of shelduck found mostly in New Guinea and Australia, and also on some of the Moluccas. It is known alternatively as the raja shelduck, black-backed shelduck, or in Australia as the Burdekin duck.

== Taxonomy ==
The specific name radjah is from the Moluccan name Radja for the radjah shelduck on the island of Buru in Indonesia.

Formerly placed in the genus Tadorna, it differs markedly from other members in external morphology and mtDNA cytochrome b sequence data, suggesting its status should be reinvestigated. Current classification places it as the only member of the genus Radjah.

== Description ==
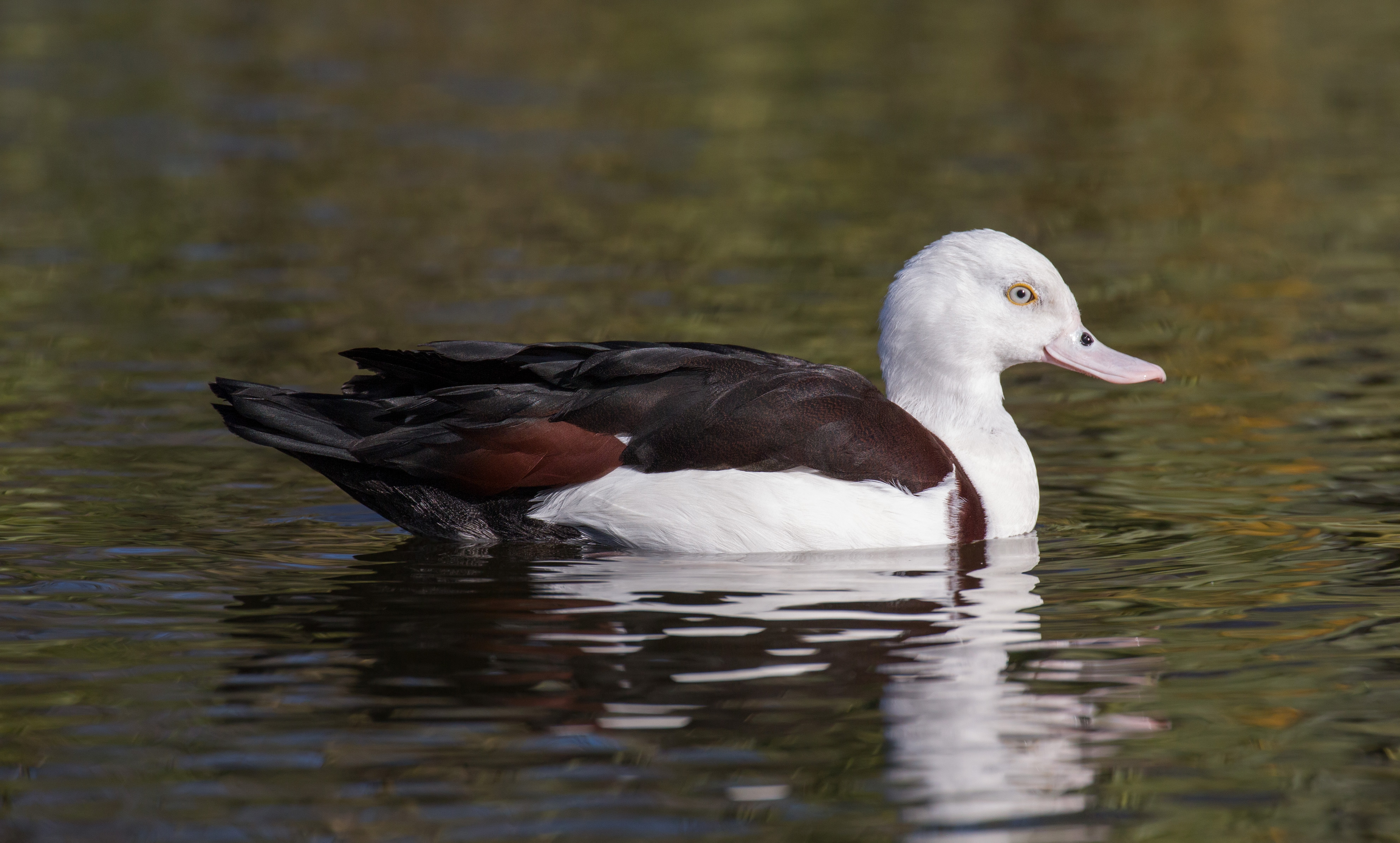
Radjah shelduck at the London Wetland Centre

Both the male and female of the species are mostly white, with dark wing-tips and a distinctive "collar" of dark feathers. When viewed from above, during flight or with wings outstretched, green bands are visible on the tops of their wings. To communicate, the female utters a harsh rattle while the male emits a breathy, "sore-throat" whistle.

== Distribution and habitat ==
The radjah shelduck inhabits the mangrove forests and coastline of New Guinea (West Papua and Papua New Guinea) and Australia, and some of the Moluccas in eastern Indonesia. In Australia, its primary range is coastal, tropical northern Australia, extending as far south as central Queensland, west through the upper regions of the Northern Territory (including Kakadu National Park) to the Kimberley in Western Australia. The radjah shelduck is listed as a protected bird in all the states of Australia, and penalties are enforced for harming or disturbing them.

The species prefers the salty waters of mangrove flats and paperbark tree swamps, but will visit all manner of brackish and freshwater swamps, lagoons, lakes, estuaries, river deltas, and billabongs further inland during the wet season.

== Behaviour ==
The radjah shelduck forms long-term, bonded pairs, and they are usually encountered in lone pairs or small flocks. During the rainy season, the males commonly become very irritable, and have been observed attacking their mates.

The ducks' preferred diet consists mainly of mollusks, aquatic or other insects, worms, aquatic weeds, sedge materials and algae. Pairs start searching for nesting sites during the months of January and February. They nest close to their primary food source, often in the hollow limbs of dead or dehydrated trees, which makes habitat destruction a particular issue.

The radjah shelduck does not use nesting materials apart from some self-supplied down feathers. Egg-laying is usually completed by May or June, but depends on the extent of the wet season. The clutches range from 6 to 12 eggs. Incubation time is about 30 days.
