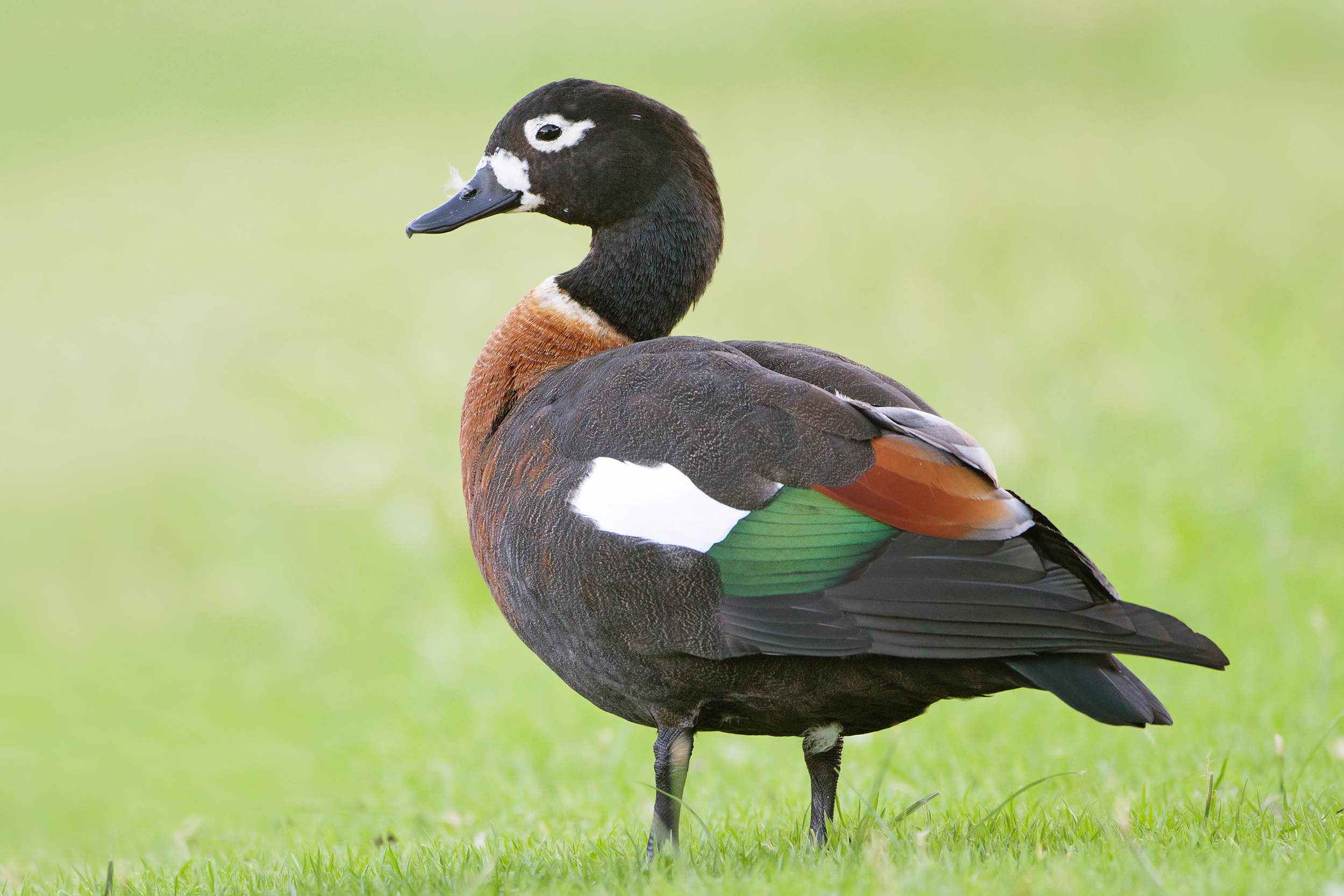
- Female
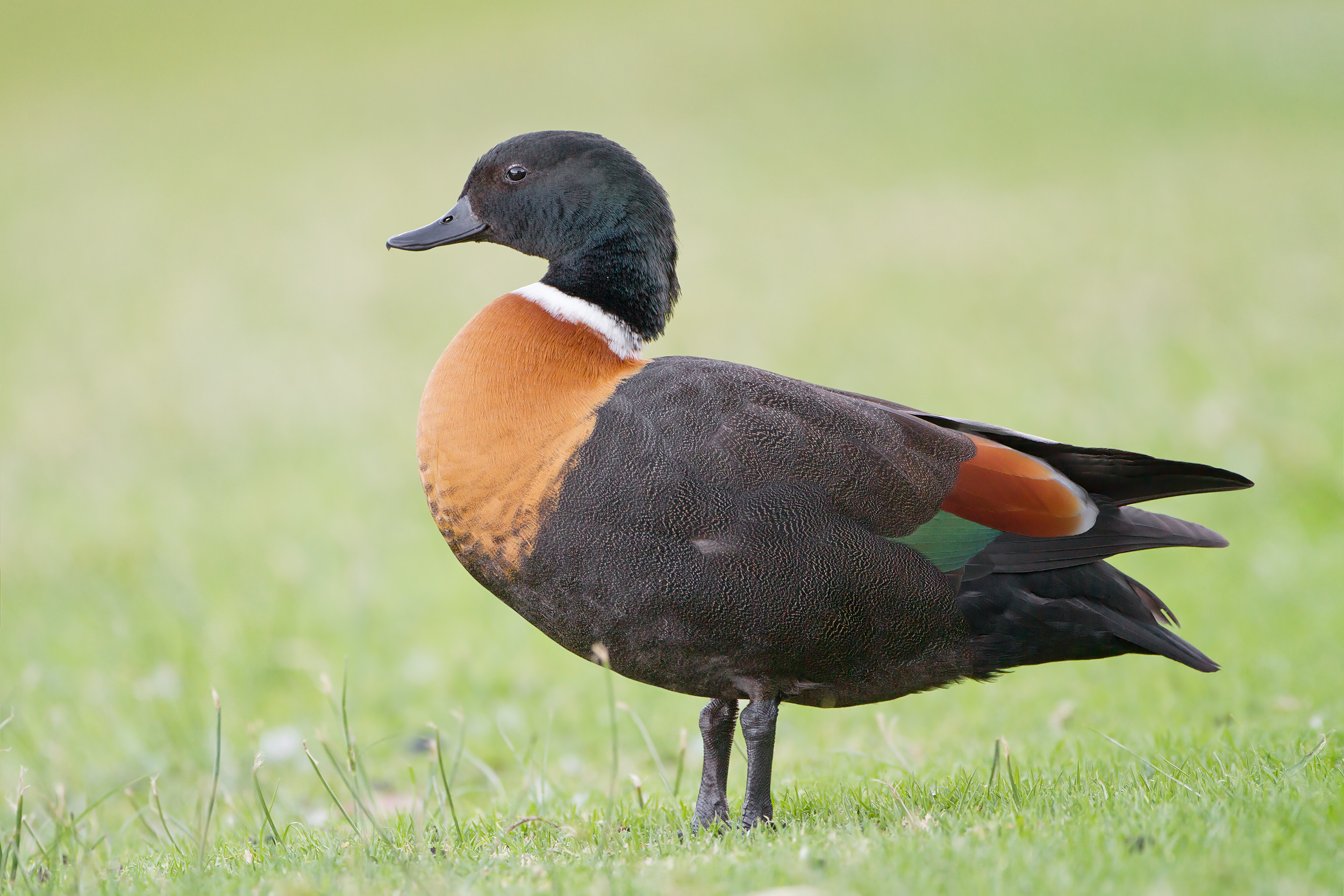
- Male

Conservation status
- Least Concern (IUCN 3.1)

Scientific classification
- Kingdom: Animalia
- Phylum: Chordata
- Class: Aves
- Order: Anseriformes
- Family: Anatidae
- Genus: Tadorna
- Species: T. tadornoides

Binomial name
- Tadorna tadornoides (Jardine & Selby, 1828)
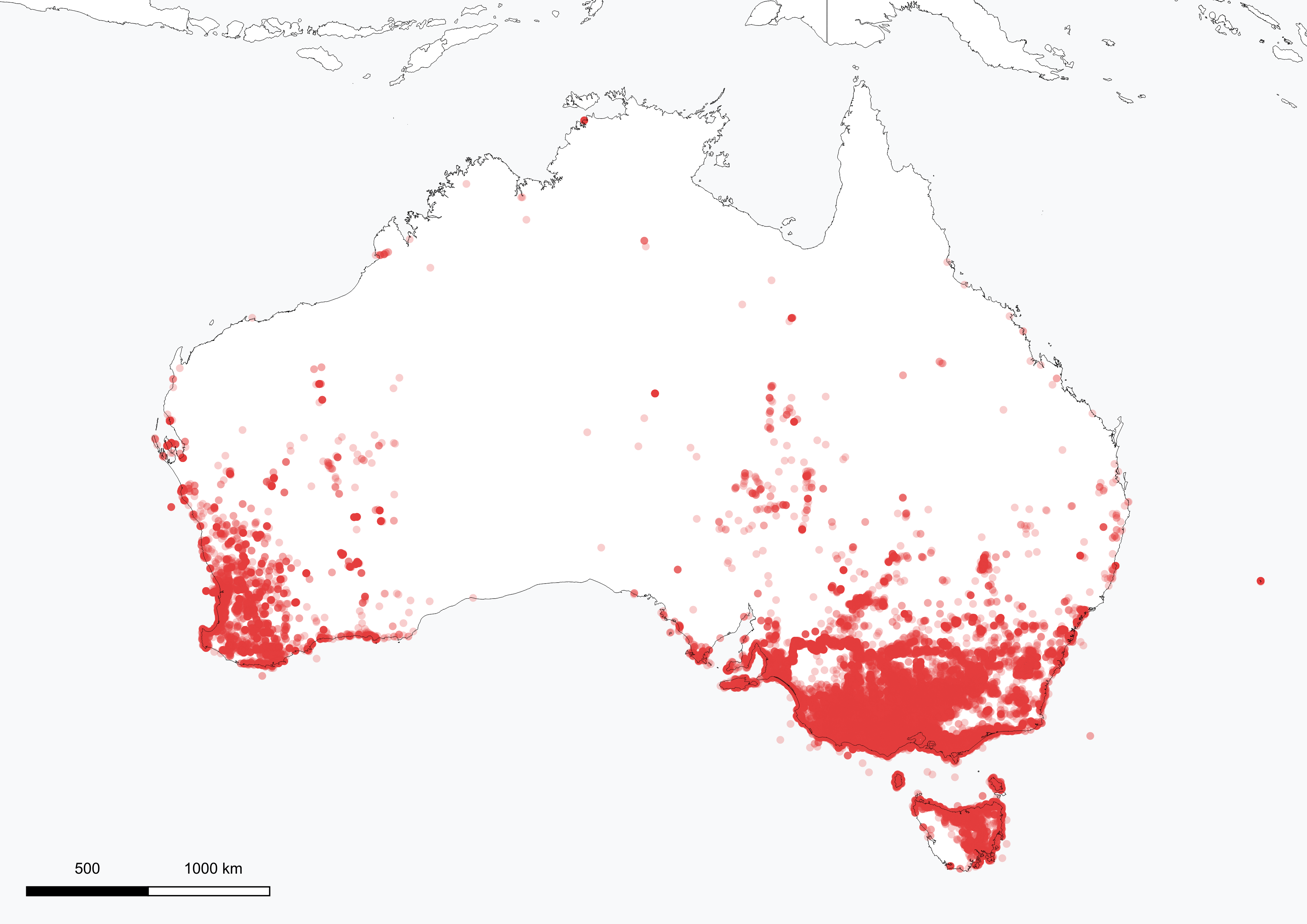
- Species distribution

= Australian shelduck =

Species of bird

The Australian shelduck (Tadorna tadornoides), also known as the chestnut-breasted shelduck or mountain duck, is a shelduck, a group of large goose-like ducks part of the bird family Anatidae. The genus name Tadorna comes from Celtic roots and means "pied waterfowl". They have a striking chestnut-coloured breast and black body. They are protected under the National Parks and Wildlife Act 1974.

== Taxonomy and naming ==
William Jardine and Prideaux John Selby described the Australian shelduck in 1828.

== Description ==
The males are mostly dark, with a chestnut breast. They have white neck collars and dark green heads. The females are similar, but they have white around the eyes and are smaller. Both males and females have chestnut and black wings with a green speculum, and show some white on their wings during flight.

The downy young are white with a brown crown and brown stripes from crown to tail. Juvenile males are duller than the adults and also lack a white collar, while juvenile females have a lot more white on their excluding their crown.

The vocal calls of the male are a deep honk similar to a goose, while the female's call is a high pitched and penetrating "zeek, zeek".

The size range of the Australian shelduck is 56–72 centimetres (22–28 in), have a wingspan of 94–132 cm (37–52 in), and weigh between 1.3–1.6 kg (2.9–3.5 lb).

== Distribution and habitat ==
The Australian shelduck mainly breeds in southern Australia and Tasmania and is still fairly common. In the winter, many birds move farther north than the breeding range. As with other shelducks, this species has favourite moulting grounds, such as Lake George, New South Wales, where sizeable concentrations occur. The Australian shelduck's primary habitat is lakes in fairly open country.

== Behaviour and ecology ==
Australian shelducks can be seen in flocks of up to 1000 or more. They are extremely wary of humans and will often call in their presence, but they can get used to people in urban areas. They are upright on land when grazing, and in the water where they sit high. Young birds dive frequently, but adult birds only dive during moulting when they are flightless, or when they are injured or scared.

=== Breeding ===
Australian shelducks often make their nests in tree holes lined with down, holes in banks, or similar locations. Eight to fifteen eggs are laid, and incubated for between thirty and thirty-three days. After leaving the nesting hollow, the downy and flightless young often aggregate in crèches of 20–40 birds, and even up to 100 birds rarely.

=== Food and feeding ===
Australian shelducks feed by grazing, dabbling and filtering. They eat tubers and other plant material, such as saltbush and samphire, along with a range of insects, crustaceans and molluscs.

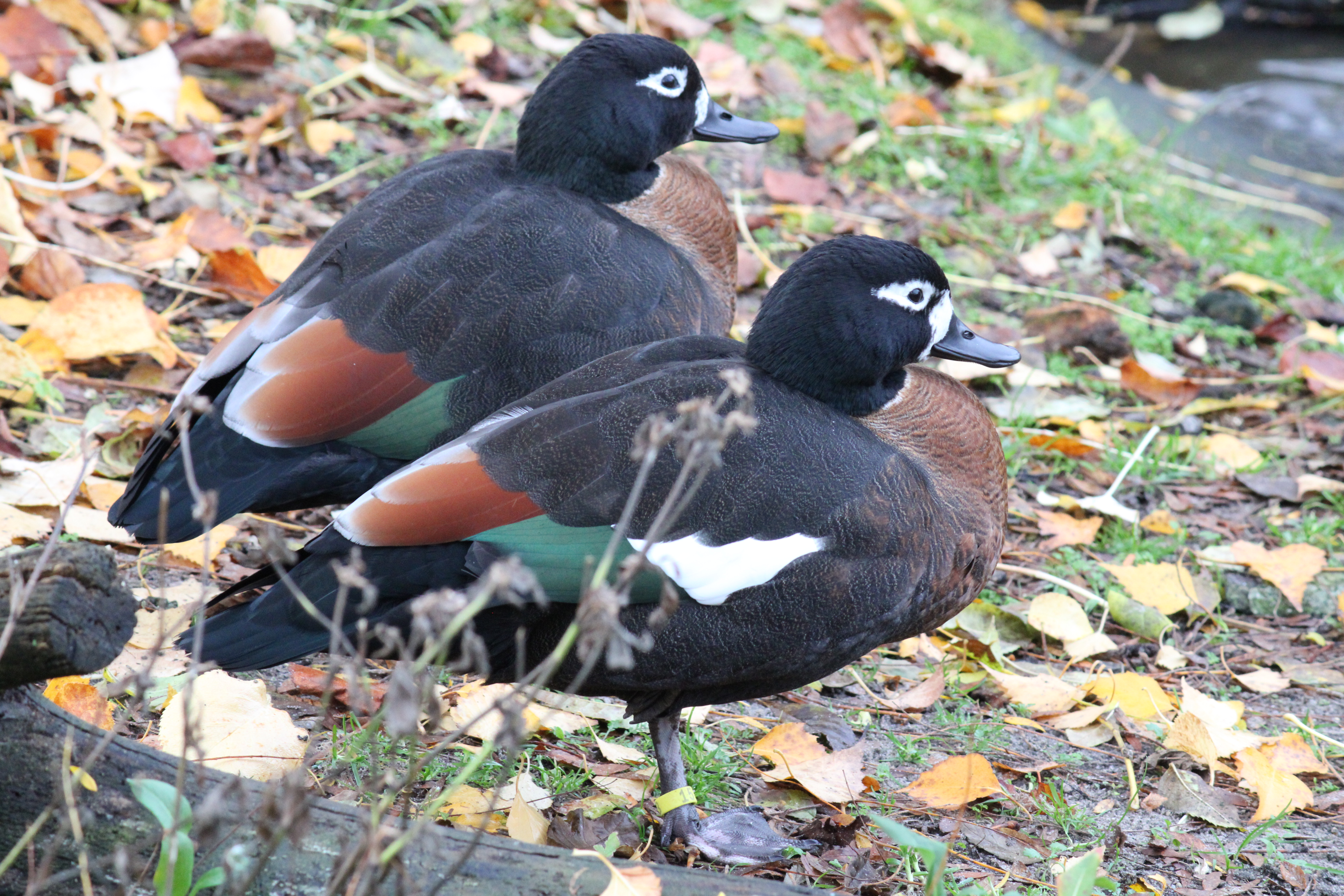
At Copenhagen Zoo
