= Speculum feathers =

Patch on inner bird wings

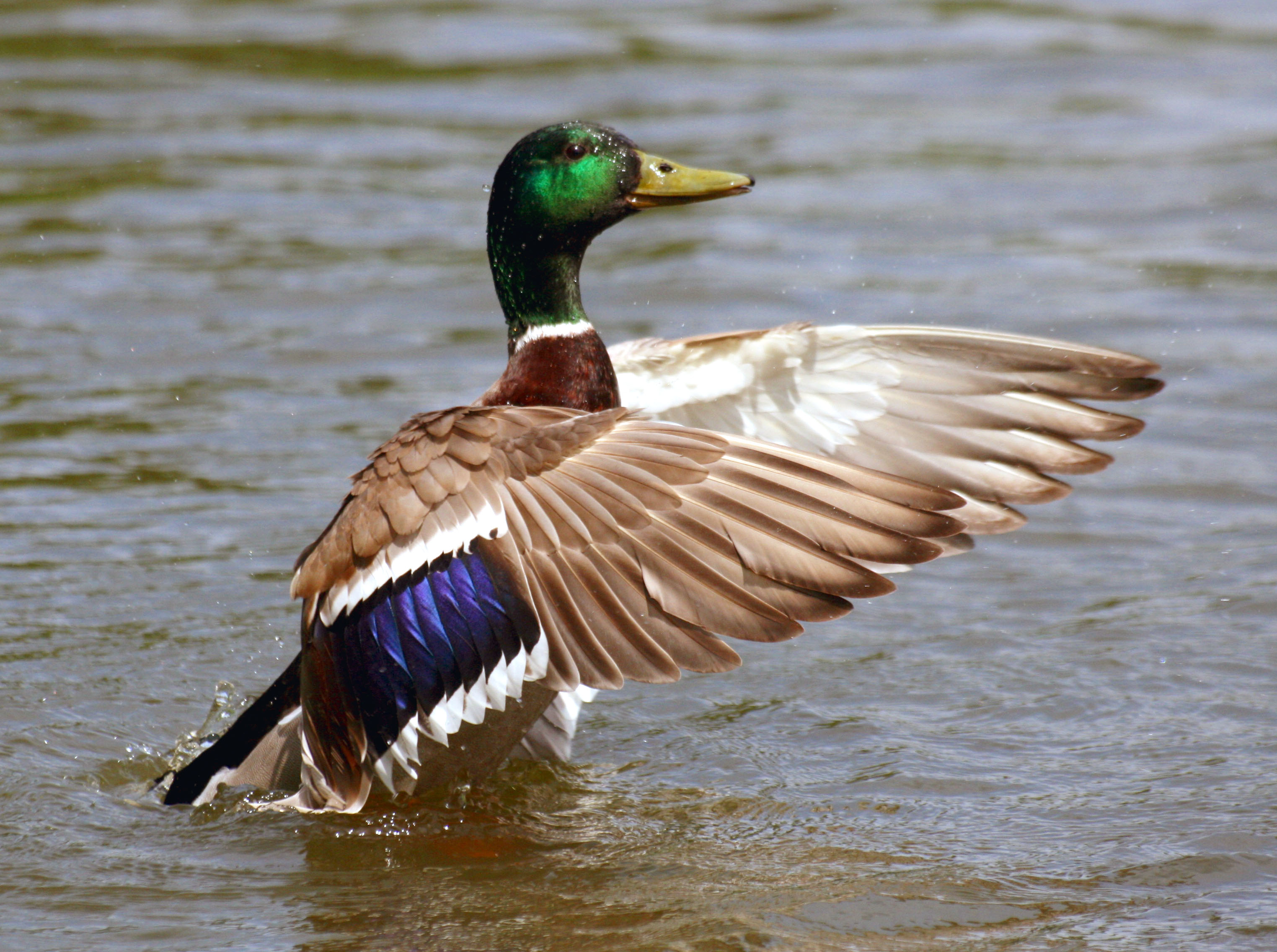
A male mallard. The speculum feathers are bright blue with white edges

The speculum is a patch, often distinctly coloured, on the secondary wing feathers, or remiges, of some birds.

Examples of the colour(s) of the speculum in a number of ducks are:

- Common teal and green-winged teal: Iridescent green edged with buff.
- Blue-winged teal: Iridescent green. The species' common name comes from the sky-blue wing coverts.
- Crested duck and bronze-winged duck: Iridescent purple-bronze, edged white.
- Pacific black duck: Iridescent green, edged light buff.
- Mallard: Iridescent purple-blue with white edges.
- American black duck: Iridescent violet bordered in black and may have a thin white trailing edge.
- Northern pintail: Iridescent green in male and brown in female, both are white on trailing edge.
- Gadwall: Both sexes have white inner secondaries.
- Yellow-billed duck: Iridescent green or blue, bordered white.

Bright wing speculums are also known from a number of other birds; among them are several parrots from the genus Amazona with red or orange speculums, though in this case the colors are pigmentary and non-iridescent.
