= List of Ramsar sites in British Overseas Territories =

This list of Ramsar sites in British Overseas Territories includes wetlands that are considered to be of international importance under the Ramsar Convention. The British Overseas Territories currently have 16 sites designated as "Wetlands of International Importance". For a full list of all Ramsar sites worldwide, see List of Ramsar wetlands of international importance.

== Bermuda ==
Name	Location	Area (km^{2})	Designated	Description	Image
Hungry Bay Mangrove Swamp	Paget Parish; 32°16′N 64°45′W	0.02	11 May 1999		
Lover's Lake Nature Reserve	St. George's Parish; 32°21′N 64°42′W	0.02	11 May 1999		
Paget Marsh	Paget Parish; 32°16′N 64°46′W	0.11	11 May 1999	An important site for crustaceans, native crabs and wintering birds including the blue land crab, the Caribbean hermit crab, the yellow-crowned night heron, the belted kingfisher.	
Pembroke Marsh East	Pembroke Parish; 32°17′N 64°46′W	0.08	11 May 1999		
Somerset Long Bay Pond	Sandys Parish; 32°18′N 64°52′W	0.01	11 May 1999		
Spittal Pond	Smith's Parish; 32°18′N 64°43′W	0.10	11 May 1999		
Warwick Pond	Warwick Parish; 32°16′N 64°48′W	0.02	11 May 1999		

== British Indian Ocean Territory ==
Name	Location	Area (km^{2})	Designated	Description	Image
Diego Garcia	Chagos Archipelago; 7°19′S 72°28′E	354.24	4 July 2001	A tropical coral atoll south of the equator in the central Indian Ocean.	

== British Virgin Islands ==
Name	Location	Area (km^{2})	Designated	Description	Image
Western Salt Ponds of Anegada	Anegada; 18°43′N 64°19′W	10.71	11 May 1999	The Western Salt Ponds includes mudflats, a mangrove, and brackish saline lagoons. It provides habitat for Caribbean flamingos and the endangered Anegada rock iguana.	

== Turks and Caicos Islands ==
Name	Location	Area (km^{2})	Designated	Description	Image
North, Middle and East Caicos Islands	Caicos Islands; 21°45′N 71°45′W	586.17	27 June 1990	A coastal wetland site, it is an important site for the West Indian whistling duck which has been listed as vulnerable by the IUCN.	

== Cayman Islands ==
Name	Location	Area (km^{2})	Designated	Description	Image
Booby Pond and Rookery	Little Cayman; 19°40′N 80°4′W	0.82	21 September 1994	A landlocked saline lagoon that supports the largest red-footed booby population in the Caribbean.	

== Cyprus ==
Name	Location	Area (km^{2})	Designated	Description	Image
Akrotiri	Sovereign Base Area; 34°37′N 32°58′E	21.71	20 March 2003	Located on Akrotiri Peninsula, the southernmost part of the island, Akrotiri includes marshes and a salt lake and flats.	

== Falkland Islands ==
Name	Location	Area (km^{2})	Designated	Description	Image
Bertha's Beach	East Falkland; 51°55′S 58°25′W	40	24 September 2001	A sandy beach on the northern shore of Choiseul Sound, East Falkland. Bertha's Beach provides habitat for several threatened species including the Falkland steamer duck.	
Sea Lion Island	near Lafonia; 52°25′S 59°5′W	10	24 September 2001	An important breeding site for the southern sea lion and the southern elephant seal.	

== Saint Helena, Ascension and Tristan da Cunha ==
Name	Location	Area (km^{2})	Designated	Description	Image
Gough Island	Tristan da Cunha; 40°19′S 9°56′W	2298.11	20 November 2008	One of five islands forming the archipelago of Tristan da Cunha, Gough Island is an important breeding site for threatened species including the sooty albatross and the northern rockhopper penguin.	
Inaccessible Island	Tristan da Cunha; 37°18′S 12°41′W	1265.24	20 November 2008	An extinct volcano that is part of the archipelago of Tristan da Cunha, Inaccessible Island is an important breeding site for seabirds and endemic landbirds.	

== See also ==
- Ramsar Convention
- List of Ramsar sites worldwide
