= Bertha's Beach Important Bird Area =

Coastal wetland of the Falkland Islands

Coordinates: 51°52′S 58°19′W

Designations

Ramsar Wetland
- Official name: Bertha's Beach
- Designated: 24 September 2001
- Reference no.: 1103

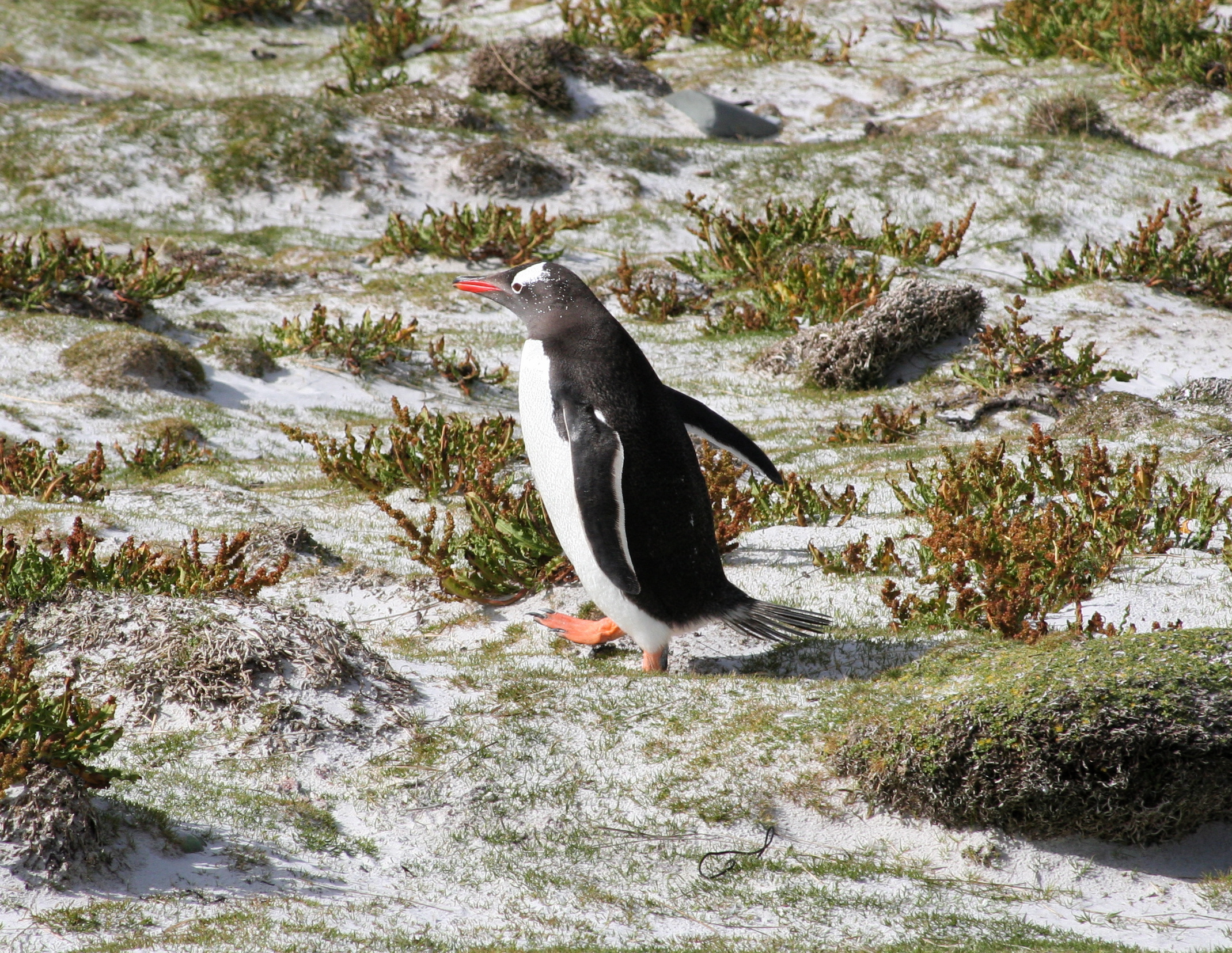
Gentoo penguin returning to its colony on Bertha's Beach

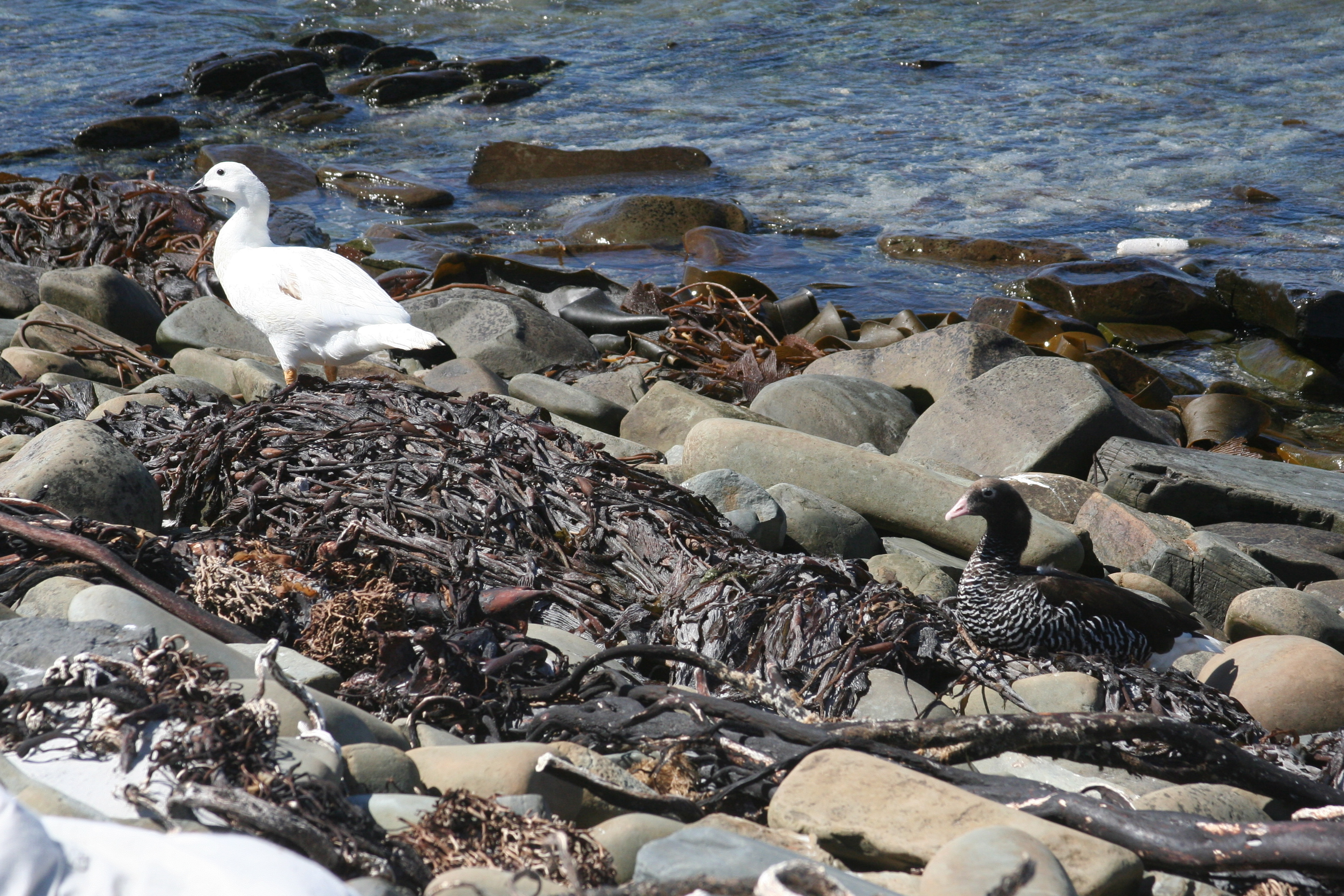
Male (left) and female kelp geese at Bertha's Beach

Bertha's Beach Important Bird Area comprises 3,300 hectares (8,200 acres) of coastal wetlands at the entrance to Choiseul Sound, on the east coast of East Falkland, in the Falkland Islands. It lies about 8 kilometres (5.0 mi) south-east of Mount Pleasant Airport and 40 km south-west of Stanley. It has been identified by BirdLife International as an Important Bird Area (IBA) because of its significancer for a variety of migratory waders and other waterbirds. Overlapping it is the 4000 ha Bertha's Beach Ramsar site, recognising it as a wetland of international importance.

== Description ==
The site comprises the coast and its immediate hinterland from Fox Point to Bertha's Beach. It contains typical Falkland coastal wetland habitat with a white sand beach, coastal dunes, maritime heathland, freshwater ponds and brackish lagoons. The land behind Bertha's Beach is dominated by white grass plains. To the north-east of Bertha's Beach is a large area of coastal lowlands with islands and promontories, with kelp beds extending up to 4 km offshore.

== Flora and fauna ==
Some 77 species of flowering plants have been recorded from the Ramsar site, including the rare Dusen's moonwort. There is breeding colony of southern sea lions at the nearby Kelp Islands. Peale's dolphins can often be seen from the beach, playing in the surf.

=== Birds ===
Birds for which the site is of conservation significance include breeding Falkland steamer ducks, ruddy-headed geese, gentoo penguins (500 pairs), Magellanic penguins and white-bridled finches, as well as migratory white-rumped sandpipers (15,000 individuals). The ponds behind the beach and dunes support many waterbirds including black-necked swans, Chiloe wigeons, Patagonian crested ducks, flying steamer ducks, yellow-billed pintails, silver and yellow-billed teals, and silvery and white-tufted grebes.
