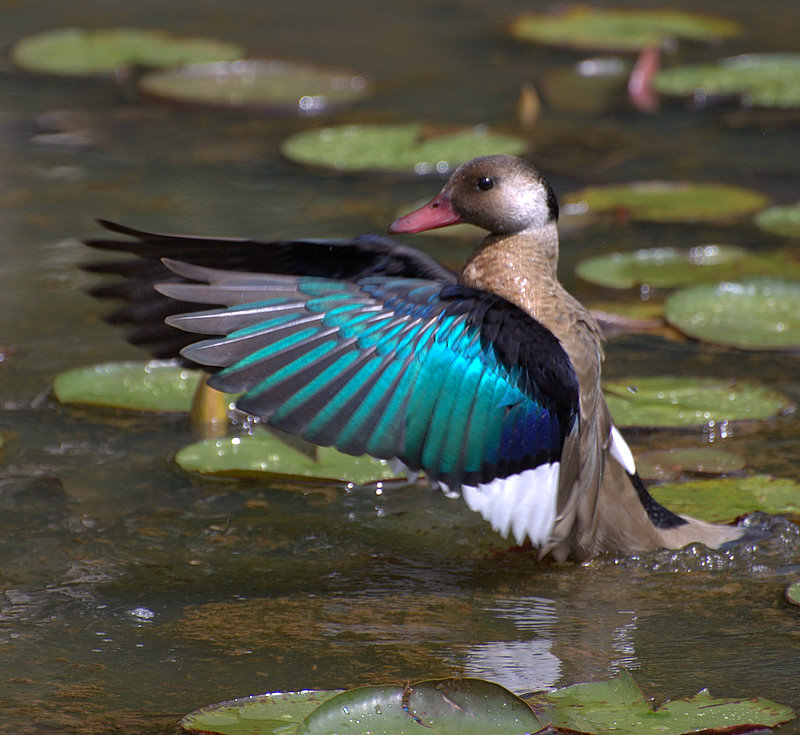
- Male

Conservation status
- Least Concern (IUCN 3.1)

Scientific classification
- Kingdom: Animalia
- Phylum: Chordata
- Class: Aves
- Order: Anseriformes
- Family: Anatidae
- Subfamily: Anatinae
- Genus: Amazonetta
- Species: A. brasiliensis

Binomial name
- Amazonetta brasiliensis (Gmelin, JF, 1789)

Subspecies
- See text

= Brazilian teal =

Species of bird

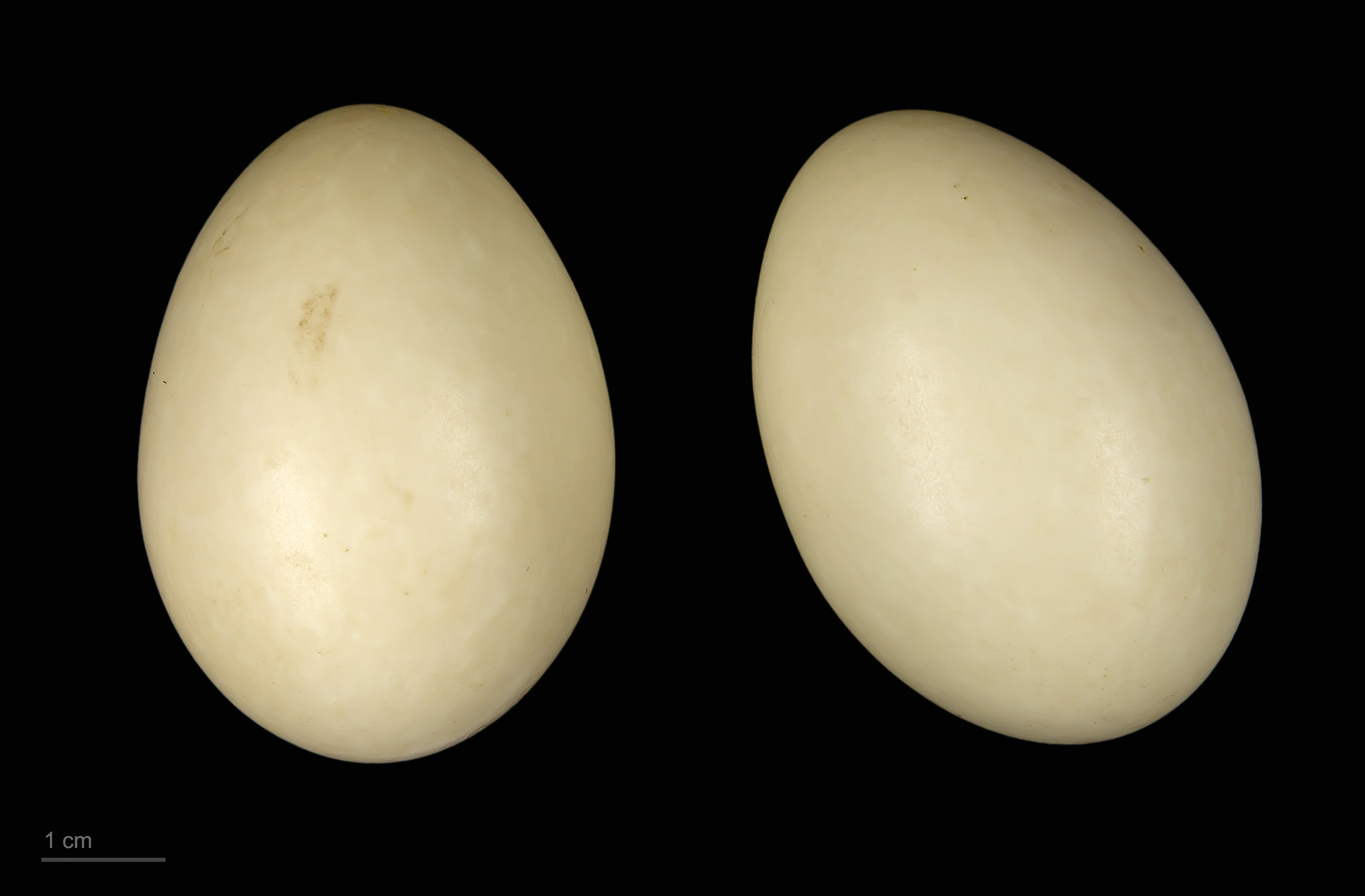
Amazonetta brasiliensis - MHNT

The Brazilian teal or Brazilian duck (Amazonetta brasiliensis) is the only extant species of duck in the genus Amazonetta. It is widely distributed in eastern South America.

== Taxonomy ==
The Brazilian teal was formally described in 1789 by the German naturalist Johann Friedrich Gmelin in his revised and expanded edition of Carl Linnaeus's Systema Naturae. He placed it with all the other ducks, swans and geese in the genus Anas and coined the binomial name Anas brasiliensis. Gmelin based his description on the Mareca alia species (the second Mareca) that was described in 1648 by the German naturalist Georg Marcgrave in his Historia Naturalis Brasiliae. The Brazilian teal is now the only living species placed in the genus Amazonetta that was introduced by the German zoologist Hans von Boetticher in 1929.

It was formerly considered a perching duck, but more recent analyses indicate that it belongs to a clade of South American dabbling ducks which also includes the crested duck, the bronze-winged duck, and possibly the steamer ducks.

Two subspecies are recognised:

- A. b. brasiliensis (Gmelin, 1789) – the nominate race, found in Brazil, Suriname, Guyana, French Guiana, central Venezuela, eastern Colombia, and northeastern Peru
- A. b. ipecutiri (Vieillot, 1816) – found in Brazil, northern Argentina, eastern Bolivia, Uruguay, and Paraguay

The extinct species Amazonetta cubensis from the Late Pleistocene of Cuba reveals that the genus formerly had a more widespread distribution.

== Description ==
The ducks are light brown in colour. Drakes distinguish themselves from females in having red beaks and legs, and in having a distinctive pale grey area on the side of its head and neck. The colour of these limbs is much duller in females.

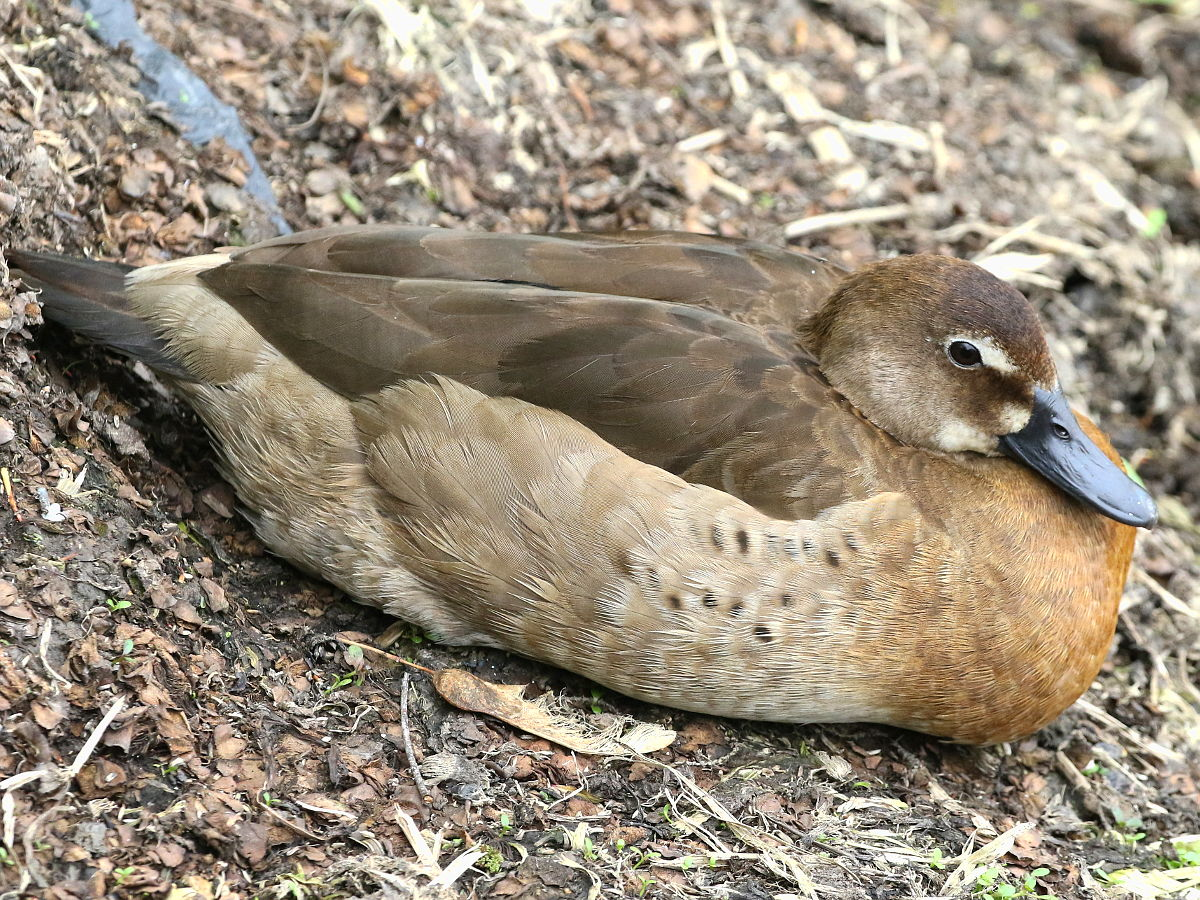
Female at Costanera Sur, Argentina

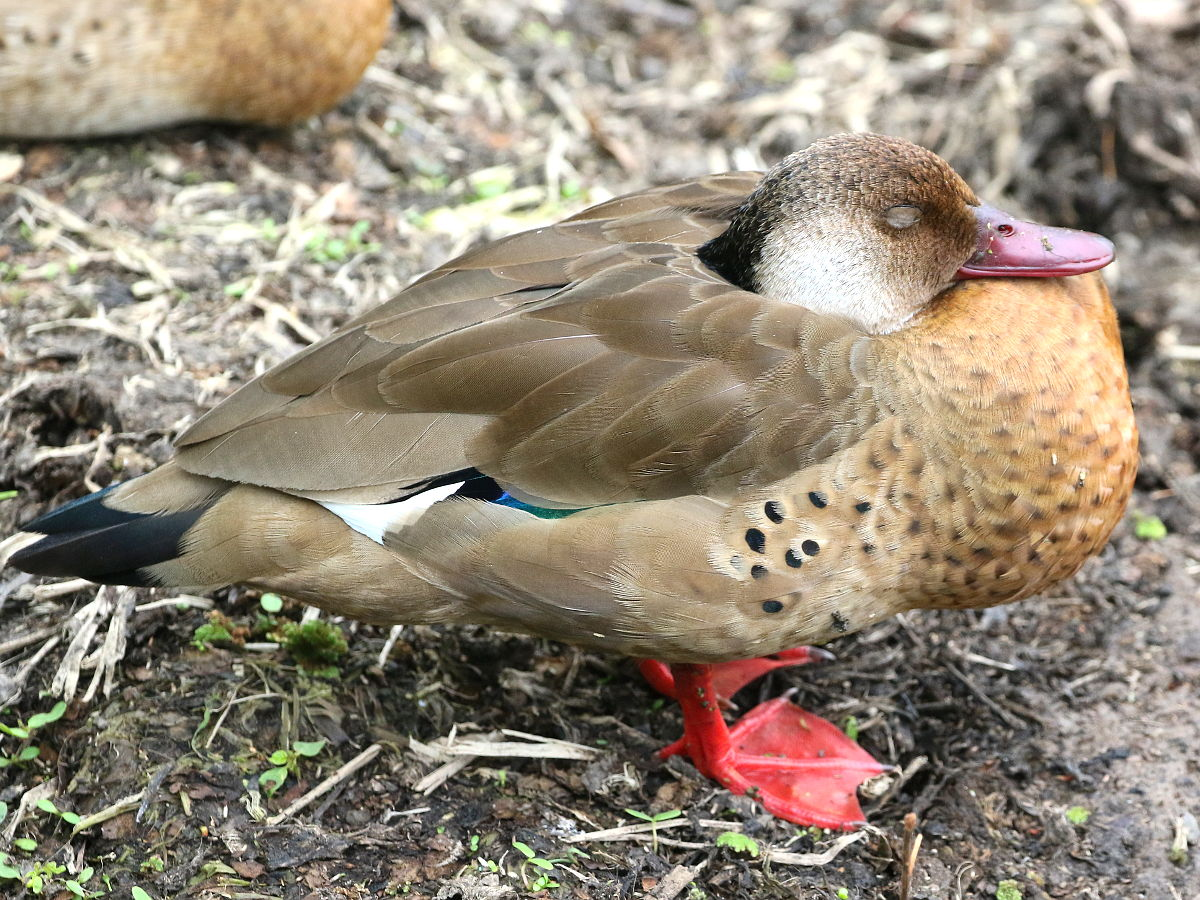
Male at Costanera Sur, Argentina

== Distribution and habitat ==
They can be found throughout eastern South America, from central Brazil, to Uruguay, to northern and eastern Argentina, Paraguay, central Venezuela, northeastern Peru, Suriname, Guyana, French Guiana, eastern Bolivia, and eastern Colombia. Their preferred habitat is a body of freshwater away from the coast with dense vegetation nearby.

== Behaviour ==
Brazilian teal live in pairs or in small groups of up to twenty birds. Both parents look after their hatchlings. They eat seeds, fruits, roots and insect, while ducklings eat only insects.

== Status ==
They are plentiful and are listed as of Least Concern.
