= Grey duck =

Grey duck may refer to:

- Grey teal, a duck found in New Guinea, Australia, New Zealand, Vanuatu and Solomon Islands
- Pacific black duck, usually called the Grey Duck in New Zealand, a duck found in Indonesia, New Guinea, Australia, New Zealand, and islands in the southwestern Pacific
- Patagonian crested duck, also known as the Southern Crested Duck, or the Grey Duck in the Falkland Islands, the nominate of two subspecies of the Crested Duck
