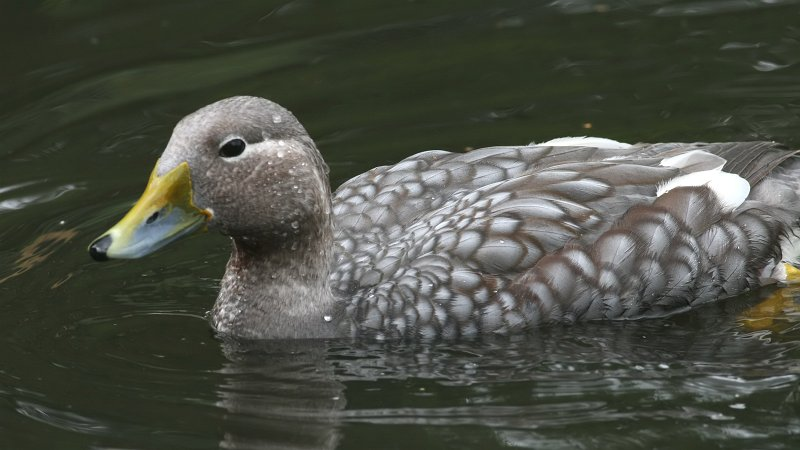

Conservation status
- Least Concern (IUCN 3.1)

Scientific classification
- Kingdom: Animalia
- Phylum: Chordata
- Class: Aves
- Order: Anseriformes
- Family: Anatidae
- Genus: Tachyeres
- Species: T. patachonicus

Binomial name
- Tachyeres patachonicus (King, 1831)

= Flying steamer duck =

Species of bird

The flying steamer duck (Tachyeres patachonicus), also known as the flying steamer-duck or flying steamerduck, is a species of South American duck in the family Anatidae.

== Taxonomy ==
The flying steamer duck was formally described in 1831 by the Royal Navy officer Phillip Parker King as Micropterus patachonicus based on a specimen collected in the Strait of Magellan. King had previously used the same specific epithet in the combination Oidemia patachonica to describe a different species, what is now, Tachyeres pteneres (Forster, 1844), the Fuegian steamer duck. The earlier name Oidemia patachonica was suppressed in 1991 by the International Commission on Zoological Nomenclature.

The flying steamer duck is one of four steamer ducks, in the genus Tachyeres, which also includes the Fuegian steamer duck (Tachyeres pteneres), the Chubut steamer duck (Tachyeres leucocephalus), and the Falkland steamer duck (Tachyeres brachypterus). The steamer ducks are named for their method of mobility, as the manner in which they use wings and feet to paddle across the water resembles an old-time steam boat. The steamer ducks are members of the Southern Hemisphere shelducks clade Tadorninae. The three flightless species are monophyletic, with the flying steamer ducks splitting off phylogenetically. It is the only steamer duck which can fly, and the only one to occur on inland fresh waters. However, some individual male flying steamer ducks within the species are incapable of flight due to excessive size and wing loadings.

== Description ==
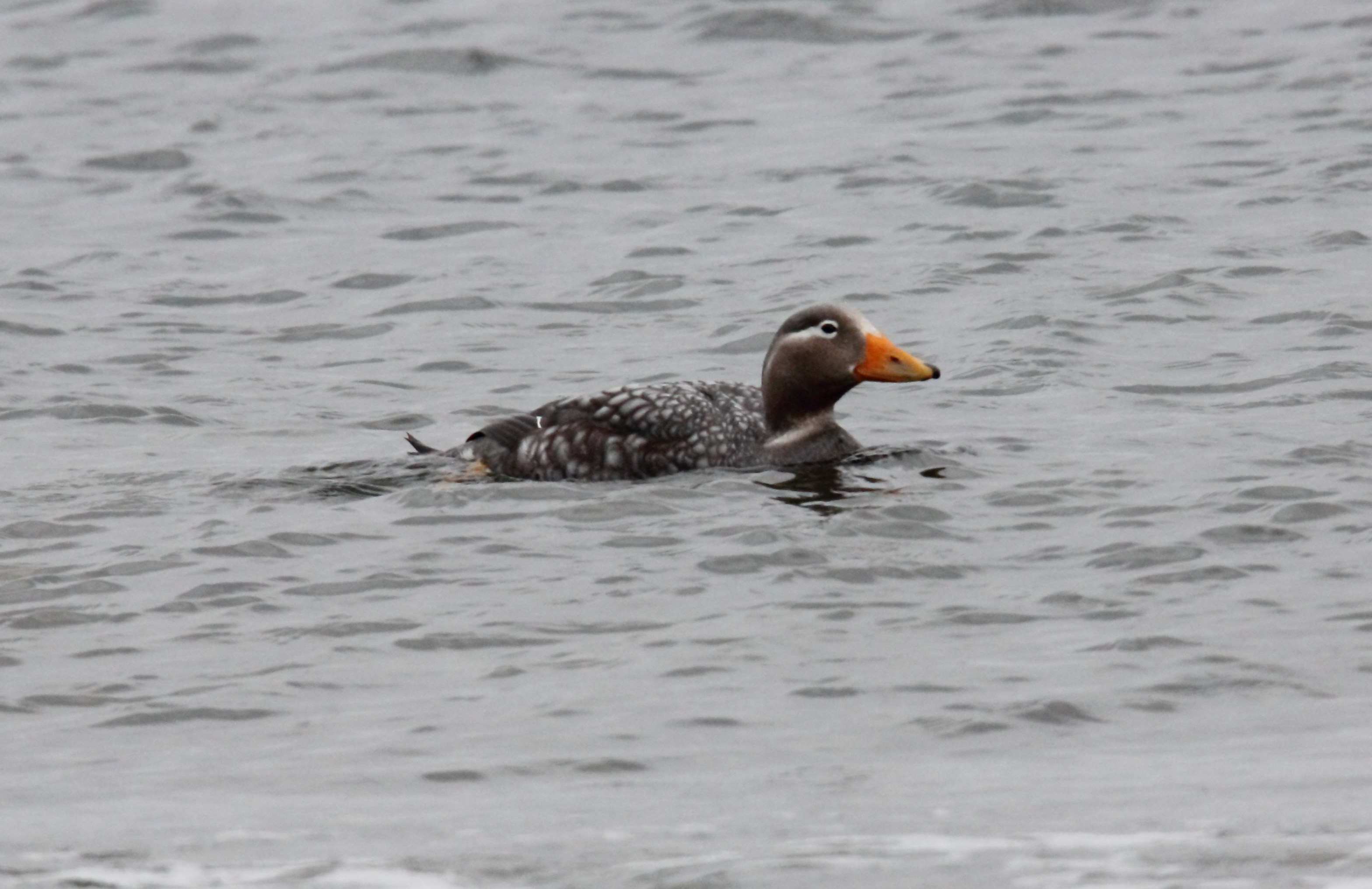
Female bird

Though they are the smallest of the four Tachyeres species, flying steamer ducks share similar plumage traits with other steamer ducks including female brown head and neck feathers with white stripes stretching from their eyes to the napes of their necks, and brown-gray gradient body feathers. Their underbellies are mostly white, and their feet are orange. Female flying steamer ducks have smaller bills relative to males that are orange with black tips, while males have darker gray bills with slight yellow accents. Flying steamer ducks are also sexually dimorphic to the extent that males are heavier but have smaller cranial elements and wingspans than females. Males and females both possess cornified orange carpal knobs on the proximal part of the carpometacarpus bone, and these knobs are used in display as well as interspecies and intraspecies combat by males.

Sexual dimorphism can also be observed in the duration and pitch of their various calls, which sound much like grunts. The females' grunts have been described as lower pitched than the males' grunts, and usually occur in rapid succession of similar pitch. Males have three distinct grunts that have been described as whistle-like, including a 'rasping' grunt, a 'ticking' grunt, and a 'sibilant' grunt.

Flying steamer ducks undergo three molts per annual cycle, and these molts vary widely with geographic location. The wear and degradation on the primary and secondary feathers of observed flying steamer ducks varies depending on the location and flight behavior of the individuals.

== Distribution and Habitat ==
Flying steamer ducks inhabit aquatic areas of central/southern Chile and Argentina. Genetic comparisons of Falkland Island steamer ducks suggest the species diverged from continental steamer duck species between 2.2 and 2.6 million years ago, coinciding with a proposed land bridge that may have once connected the Falkland Islands to the mainland. The three steamer duck species that inhabit the mainland share a common ancestor roughly 15,000 years ago, and the species show genetic differentiation as well as different stages between flightless-ness and flying ability. For this reason, steamer ducks have been praised as an excellent potential genus for studying the evolution of flightless-ness in birds. Flying steamer ducks are widely distributed compared to other steamer duck species, likely due to their flying ability, and have been observed to reside in both freshwater and marine environments throughout Chile, Argentina, and the Falkland Islands.

== Behavior and Ecology ==
=== Breeding ===
Little is known about the breeding rituals of flying steamer ducks. They are thought to be mostly monogamous and spend much of their time together in pairs. They engage in highly ritualized mating, in which the male and female begin by dipping their bills into the water at increasingly fast paces before the female submerges almost completely into the water and is mounted by the male, after which the female and male raise their bills high into the air in a hostile fashion and grunt audibly.

=== Food and Feeding ===
Both flightless and flying steamer ducks engage in foraging behaviors with interspecific and intersexual differences. Flying steamer ducks have almost exclusively been observed to forage in pairs, preferring to dive either around deep-water kelp beds or around shallow water zones. Males and females do not show consistencies among pairs in terms of who is the first to dive, but within pairs the first to dive is consistent in all observed diving instances. Flying steamer ducks share dietary preferences with other steamer duck species and have been reported to feed on mollusks and crustaceans as well as other marine invertebrates, but little is known about the precise species that steamer ducks prey on.

=== Threats ===
Both flying steamer ducks and flightless steamer ducks experience nest predation by various avian and mammalian predators, including Chimango Caracaras, *Crested Caracaras, the Fuegian Culpeo Fox, and the introduced American mink. Besides nest predators, flying steamer ducks are threatened only by competition for resources. Both the males and females are notoriously pugnacious and have been described as intensely territorial and often unnecessarily aggressive towards other individuals and other species, regardless of whether or not that species poses a threat to or lives in competition with the flying steamer ducks. Flying steamer ducks have been observed to target entire flocks of Silvery grebes and Hooded grebes and have also been observed to kill Red shovelers for seemingly no apparent reason. Male flying steamer ducks attack by grabbing their opponents by the neck and hitting their opponents on the head, neck or body using their carpal wing knobs.

== Status ==
The flying steamer ducks are not an endangered species and are categorized as a Least Concern species, however increased nest predation of flightless steamer duck nests by American minks was reported to be a potential future threat to duck populations in Tierra del Fuego wildlife areas.
