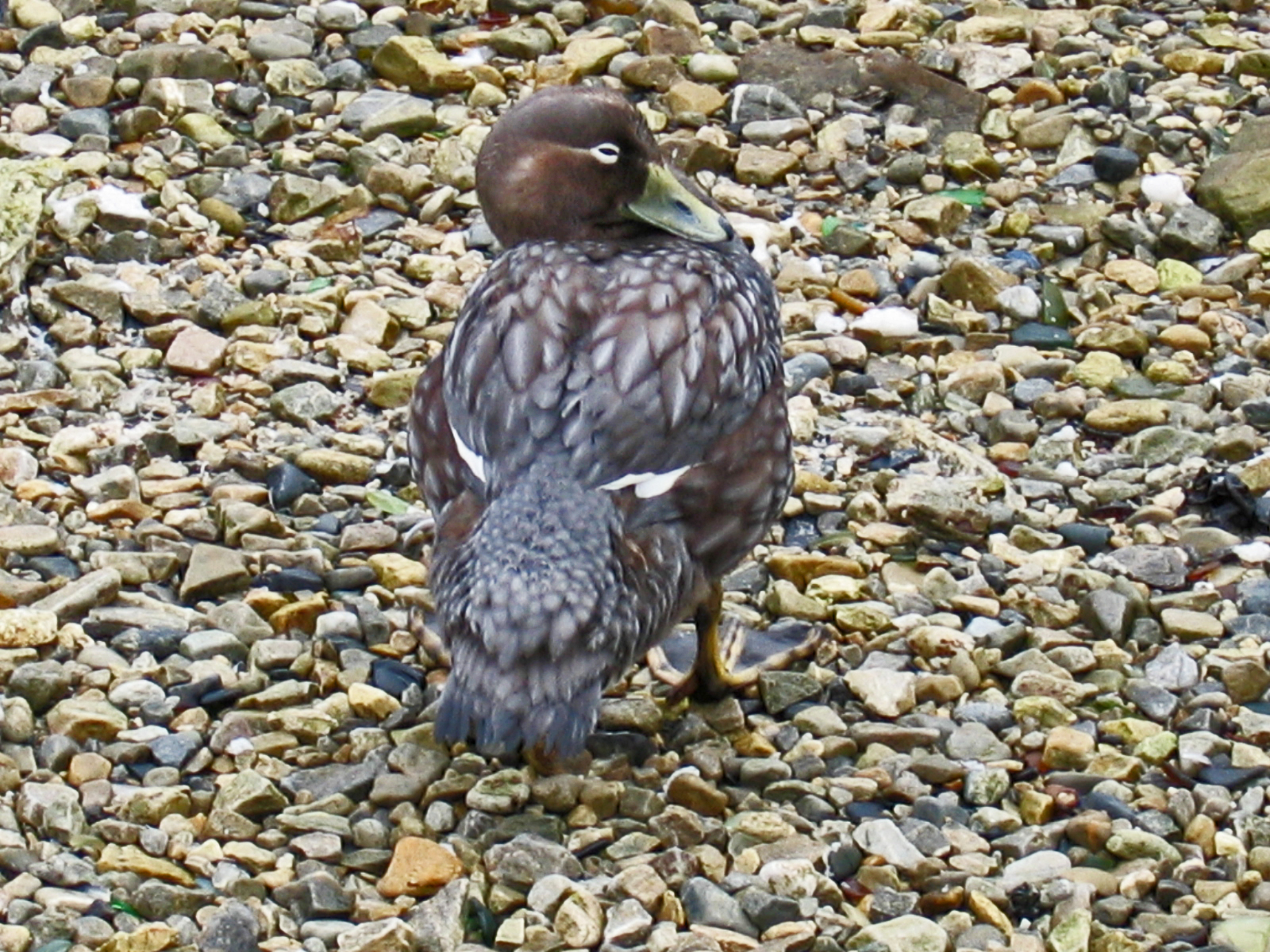
- Falkland steamer duck, Tachyeres brachypterus

Scientific classification
- Kingdom: Animalia
- Phylum: Chordata
- Class: Aves
- Order: Anseriformes
- Family: Anatidae
- Subfamily: Anatinae
- Genus: Tachyeres; Owen, 1875

Type species
- Anas brachyptera Latham, 1790

Species
- Tachyeres patachonicus Tachyeres pteneres Tachyeres brachypterus Tachyeres leucocephalus

Synonyms
- Micropterus Lesson 1828 non Lacépède 1802; Microa Strand 1943

= Steamer duck =

Steamer ducks

Genus of birds

The steamer ducks are a genus (Tachyeres) of ducks in the family Anatidae. Three of the four species occur in the southern part of the Southern Cone of South America in Chile and Argentina, and the fourth on the Falkland Islands 500 km to the east; all except the flying steamer duck are flightless, and even this one species capable of flight only rarely takes to the air. They can be aggressive and are capable of chasing off predators like petrels. Bloody battles of steamer ducks with each other over territory disputes are observed in nature. They even kill waterbirds that are several times their size.

== Taxonomy ==
The genus Tachyeres was introduced in 1875 by the English zoologist Richard Owen to accommodate the Falkland steamer duck. The genus name Tachyeres, "having fast oars" or "fast rower", comes from Ancient Greek ταχυ- "fast" + ἐρέσσω "I row (as with oars)". The common name "steamer ducks" arose because, when swimming fast, they flap their wings into the water as well as using their feet, creating an effect like a paddle steamer.

They were usually placed in the shelduck subfamily Tadorninae. However, mtDNA sequence analyses of the cytochrome b, NADH dehydrogenase subunit 2, and other genes indicate that Tachyeres instead belongs in a distinct clade of aberrant South American dabbling ducks, which also includes the Brazilian teal Amazonetta brasiliensis, the crested duck Lophonetta specularioides, and the bronze-winged duck Speculanas specularis.

A 2026 study argued that traditional morphometric traits such as wing loading and body mass are insufficient for species delimitation in the genus, supporting the use of bioacoustic data alongside molecular evidence.

=== Extant species ===
There are currently four recognised species:

Genus Tachyeres – Owen, 1875 – four species
Common name	Scientific name and subspecies	Range	Size and ecology	IUCN status and estimated population
Flying steamer duck	Tachyeres patachonicus (King, 1831)	southern Chile and Argentina, Tierra del Fuego and the Falkland Islands.	Size: Habitat: Diet:	LC
Chubut steamer duck	Tachyeres leucocephalus Humphrey & Thompson, 1981	Argentina	Size: Habitat: Diet:	VU
Fuegian steamer duck	Tachyeres pteneres (Forster, 1844)	southern Chile and Chiloé to Tierra del Fuego	Size: Habitat: Diet:	LC
Falkland steamer duck	Tachyeres brachypterus (Latham, 1790)	the Falkland Islands in the southern Atlantic Ocean.	Size: Habitat: Diet:	LC

A 2026 bioacoustic study proposed the existence of an additional, previously unrecognised species from southern Chile, which was named the Chiloe steamer duck (T. ketru). It is distinguished primarily by vocalisation patterns and differences in the coloration of bare parts despite close morphological similarity to the Fuegian steamer duck (T. pteneres).

=== Phylogeny ===
Genetic evidence suggests the species form two sister groups:

- - Tachyeres patachonicus (King 1831) (Flying steamer duck)
  - Tachyeres leucocephalus Humphrey & Thompson 1981 (Chubut steamer duck)
- - Tachyeres pteneres (Forster 1844) (Fuegian steamer duck)
  - Tachyeres brachypterus (Latham 1790) (Falkland steamer duck)

== Evolution ==
=== Flightlessness ===
Flightless Tachyeres may be paraphyletic, as shown above. There are multiple possible explanations of this. It is unlikely that flightlessness evolved once in all Tachyeres and then disappeared in T. patachonicus, because there is no evidence for a reversal of evolution, and these reversals are extremely rare. It is more likely that flightlessness evolved independently in each steamer duck species. The DYRK1A enzyme has been identified as a candidate gene for flightlessness in steamer ducks. This finding, combined with the range of flight capability, means the evolutionary history of the group may not be so clear cut.

There is genomic evidence of recent speciation into the four Tachyeres species. Flightless Tachyeres are thought to be undergoing a modern evolutionary transition to flightlessness, which explains the range of flight capability observed across the genus. The largest males of the most volant species, the flying steamer duck, are completely incapable of flight, while other individuals rarely fly. The flying steamer duck is the only species to reside in landlocked bodies of water. Generally, island bound/isolated avian populations are more likely to experience evolution towards flightlessness, which may be the case for several Tachyeres populations in the coastal South American regions.
