= Chubut =

Chubut may refer to:

- Chubut Province, Argentina
- Chubut River in the Chubut Province
- Chubut steamer duck, a flightless duck endemic to Argentina
