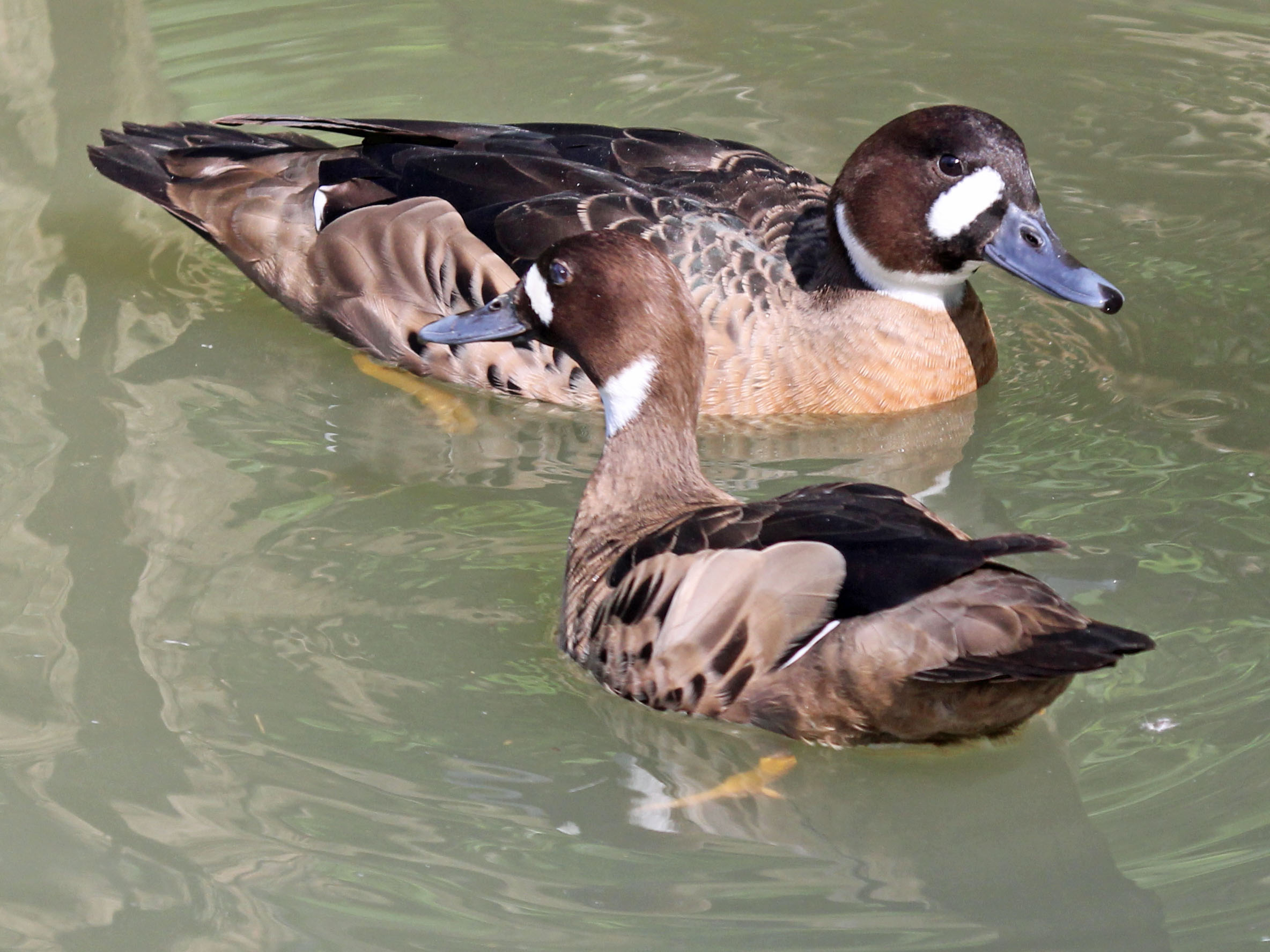
- A pair of bronze-winged ducks

Conservation status
- Near Threatened (IUCN 3.1)

Scientific classification
- Kingdom: Animalia
- Phylum: Chordata
- Class: Aves
- Order: Anseriformes
- Family: Anatidae
- Genus: Speculanas von Boetticher, 1929
- Species: S. specularis

Binomial name
- Speculanas specularis (King, 1828)

Synonyms
- Anas specularis

= Bronze-winged duck =

Species of bird

The bronze-winged duck (Speculanas specularis) also known as the spectacled duck, is a dabbling duck and the sole member of its genus Speculanas. It is often placed in Anas with most other dabbling ducks, but its closest relative is either the crested duck or the Brazilian duck, which likewise form monotypic genera. Together they belong to a South American lineage which diverged early from the other dabbling ducks and may include the steamer ducks.

Named after the "bronze" speculum this species is also known as "pato perro" or "dog-duck" after the harsh barking call of the female.

The bronze-winged duck lives among forested rivers and fast-flowing streams on the lower slopes of the South American Andes, in central and southern Chile and adjacent parts of Argentina.

The sexes are alike.

The species lives on forested rivers. While they appear to prefer fast-moving water, they can also be found less frequently in forested ponds. They eat plants and small invertebrates, including water crowfoot (Ranunculus sp.), water milfoil (Myriophyllum sp.), bulrushes, as well as caddisfly larvae and snails.
