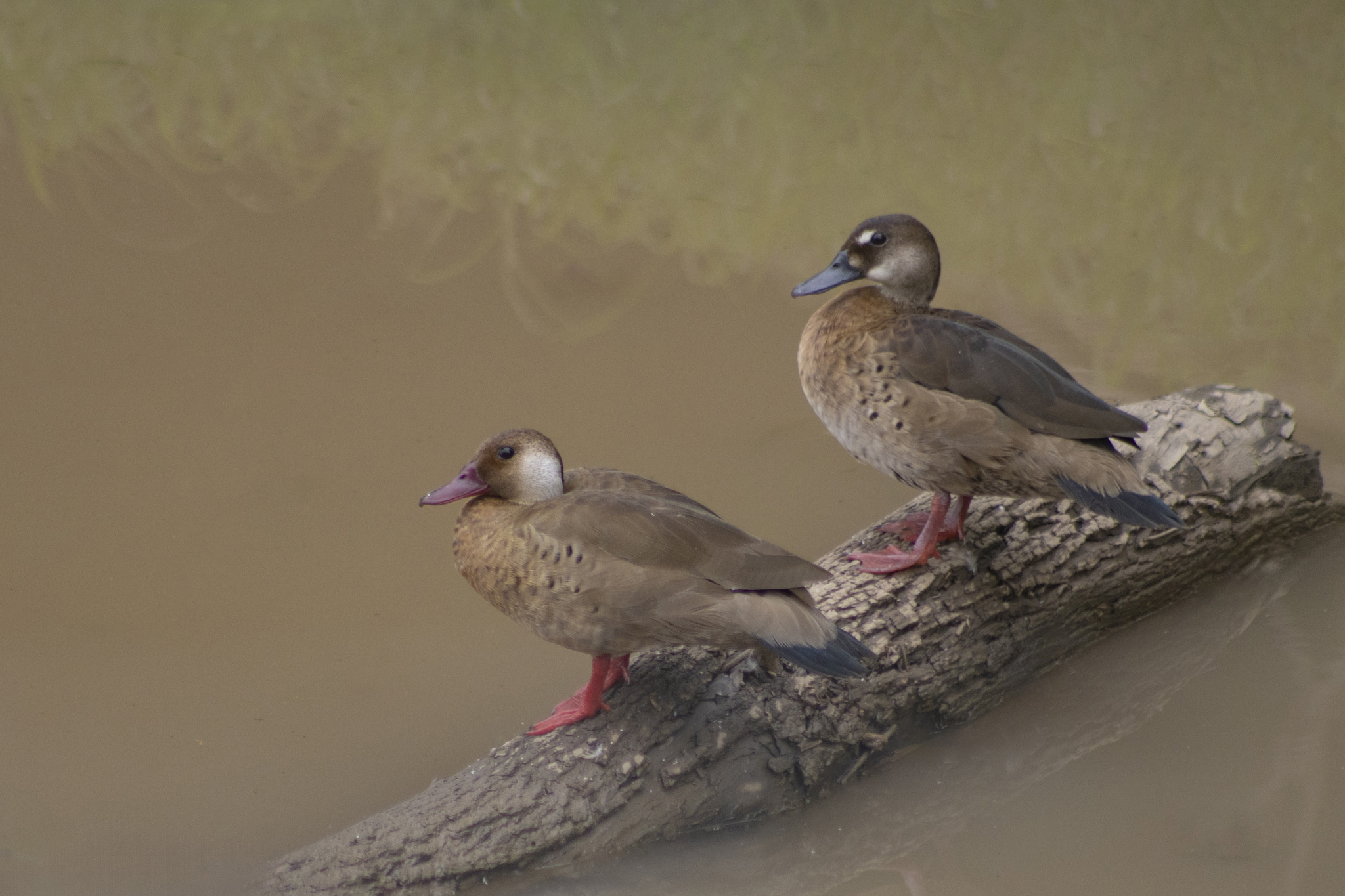
- Brazilian teal (Amazonetta braziliensis)

Scientific classification
- Domain: Eukaryota
- Kingdom: Animalia
- Phylum: Chordata
- Class: Aves
- Order: Anseriformes
- Family: Anatidae
- Subfamily: Anatinae
- Genus: Amazonetta; Boetticher, 1929

Species
- Amazonetta brasiliensis Gmelin, JF, 1789; †Amazonetta cubensis Zelenkov, 2025

= Amazonetta =

Amazonetta Temporal range: Late Pleistocene - Recent

Genus of birds

Amazonetta is a genus of ducks that contains two species, an extant species, the Brazilian teal (Amazonetta brasiliensis) and the fossil species Amazonetta cubensis from the late Pleistocene of Cuba.
