= Amazonetta cubensis =

Scientific classification
- Kingdom: Animalia
- Phylum: Chordata
- Class: Aves
- Order: Anseriformes
- Family: Anatidae
- Genus: Amazonetta
- Species: †A. cubensis

Binomial name
- †Amazonetta cubensis Zelenkov, 2025

Extinct species of duck

Amazonetta cubensis (also known as the Cuban teal) is a species of duck in the family Anatidae that lived in Cuba during the Pleistocene epoch. It is a relatively small species of duck similar in morphology to the extant Brazilian teal, however, the shaft was thinner and more steeply oriented.

The scientific name of this species is referencing its occurrence in Cuba. The common name Cuban teal has been suggested because of this.

== Discovery ==
A complete humerus (PIN 5781/40) was discovered and given the classification of a new species. The fossil was discovered in western cuba in the El Abrón Cave strata which was dated to the late Pleistocene epoch.

The evolutionary history and past diversity of ducks in the West Indies is largely unknown due to a poor fossil record of birds in the region. This makes the discovery of this species important for uncovering the history of ducks in this region. The closest living ancestor of A. cubensis is a Brazilian species named Amazonetta brasiliensis (Brazilian teal). This has means that Amazonetta had a wider distribution during the late Quaternary period.
