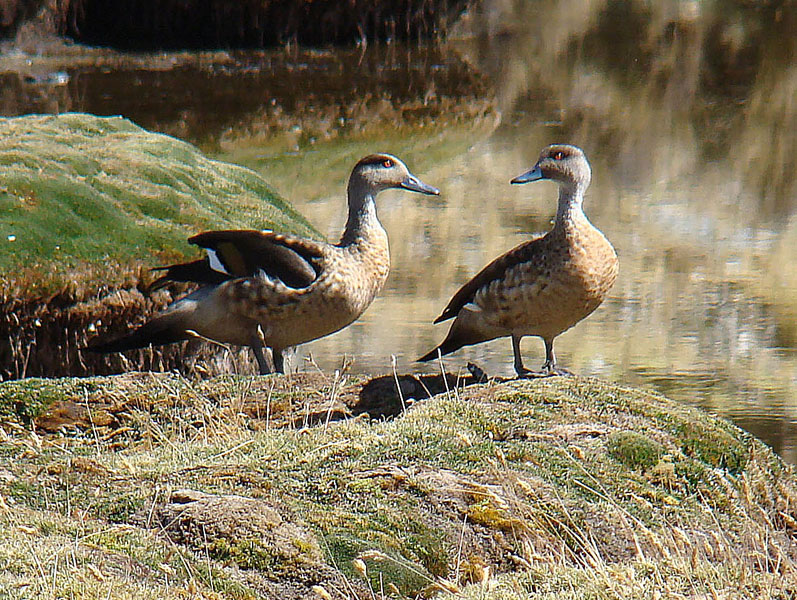
- Andean Crested Duck

Scientific classification
- Kingdom: Animalia
- Phylum: Chordata
- Class: Aves
- Order: Anseriformes
- Family: Anatidae
- Genus: Lophonetta
- Species: L. specularioides
- Subspecies: L. s. alticola

Trinomial name
- Lophonetta specularioides alticola Ménégaux, 1909

Synonyms
- Anas specularioides alticola

= Andean crested duck =

Subspecies of bird

The Andean crested duck (Lophonetta specularioides alticola) is one of two subspecies of the crested duck. It is much rarer than its sibling subspecies, the Patagonian crested duck.

== Taxonomy ==
The Andean crested duck is the only species within the genus (Lophonetta specularioides ). Two subspecies are generally recognized. The nominate subspecies, (Lophonetta specularioides specularioides) occurs mainly in southern and lower-elevation regions. The second subspecies, (Lophonetta specularioides alticola), inhabits higher elevations in the Andes. These subspecies differ slightly in physical characteristics and ecological adaptations associated with elevation.

== Description ==
The Andean crested duck is a large duck commonly found in lakes, wetlands, rivers, bogs, and along seacoasts. They have gray-brown feathers with pale dapples on the side of their bodies, as well as a short crest on their heads. Their bills, faces, and legs are dark. In Patagonia, their eyes are commonly red; in the Northern Andes, their eyes are commonly orange. Males and females of the species do not have much visual difference.

== Distribution and habitat ==
The subspecies is found on lakes in the Andes of South America, ranging at altitudes of 2,000-4,300 m above sea level from the Huánuco Region of central Peru southwards through the mountains of Bolivia to Talca Province in central Chile and Mendoza Province in northern Argentina. It generally breeds above 3,500 m asl.

== Ecology and behavior ==
The species occupies a variety of wetland habitats and may occur in pairs or small groups while feeding. Many populations undertake seasonal attitudinal migrations between elevations in response to environmental changes such as freezing temperatures or the drying of wetlands.

== Morphological variation and elevation ==
Research has shown that body size in crested ducks varies across different elevations. Studies comparing populations of (Lophonetta specularioides) found that the Andean Crested Duck living at higher elevations tend to be larger than those from lower elevations. Measurements such as body mass, wing length, tarsus length, and bill length were found to increase with elevation in some populations.

These patterns are consistent with ecological principles such as Bergmann’s rule, which suggests that animals living in colder climates tend to have larger body sizes. Such variation may reflect adaptations to environmental conditions associated with high-altitude habitats, including colder temperatures and reduced oxygen levels.
