= Hans von Boetticher =

German zoologist (1886–1958)

Hans von Boetticher (30 August 1886 – 20 January 1958) was a German zoologist who worked on ornithology and entomology. Boetticher was employed at the natural history museum in Coburg.

Several of his works deal with the higher level taxonomy of bird groups based on morphology, phylogeny and biogeography. Some of his other works include those on the pinnipeds. His special area of interest included ducks and geese, turacos, parrots, pigeons and sea-birds. The South American duck genera Amazonetta and Speculanas were designated by him. Some of the other bird taxa that he named such as Galapagornis are no longer valid.

He wrote a series of books on bird families. These included Gänse- und Entenvögel aus aller Welt (1952), Albatrosse und andere Sturmvögel (1955), Lärmvögel, Turakos und Pisangfresser (1955), Fasanen, Pfauen, Perlhühner und andere Zierhühner (1956) and Pelikane, Kormorane und andere Ruderfüßler (1957).

== Partial list of publications ==
- Von Boetticher, H., 1964. Papageien. Ziemsen, Wittenberg
- Boetticher, H. von 1954. Die Taubengattung Columba L. Zoologischer Anzeiger, 153:49-64.
- von Boetticher, H. 1934. Beitrag zu einem phylogenetisch begründeten, natürlichen System der Steißhühner (Tinami) auf Grund einiger taxonomisch verwertbarer Charaktere. Jenaische Zeitschr. Naturw. 69: 169–192.
- von Boetticher, 1931, Vogel ferner Lander, vol. 5
- von Boetticher, H. 1943. Gedanken über die systematic Stellung einiger Papagaien. Zool. Anz. 143:191–200.
- von Boetticher, H. 1959. Papagaien. Wittenberg Lutherstadt, A. Ziemsen.
- von Boetticher, H. 1935. Der Gaimardische Buntkormoran. Vogel ferner Ender 1935: 81-83
- von Boetticher, H. 1934. Die geographische Verbreitung der Robben, Zeitschr. für Saugetierkunde. 9:359-368.
- von Boetticher, H. 1940. Verzeichnis der Typen in der Vogelsammlung der Museum der Zoologisches Institut der Universität Halle an der Saale. Zeitschr. Naturwiss. 94: 205–214.
- Boetticher, Hans von. 1955. Albatrosse und andere Sturmvögel. Wittenberg. 96 pp. 33 ills. Soft cover. (Neue Brehm-Bücherei 163).
- Boetticher, Hans von. 1957. Pelikane, Kormorane und andere Ruderfüssler. Wittenberg. 94,(2) pp. 48 ills. Soft cover. (Neue Brehm-Bücherei 188).
- Boetticher H. von 1955. Der Blaufuß-Tölpel "Camanay", Sula nebouxii Milne-Edwards. Anzeiger der Ornithologischen Gesellschaft in Bayern 4: 375.
- von Boetticher, H. 1951. La systématique des guêpiers. Oiseau. Rev. Fr. Ornithol. 5: 194–199.
