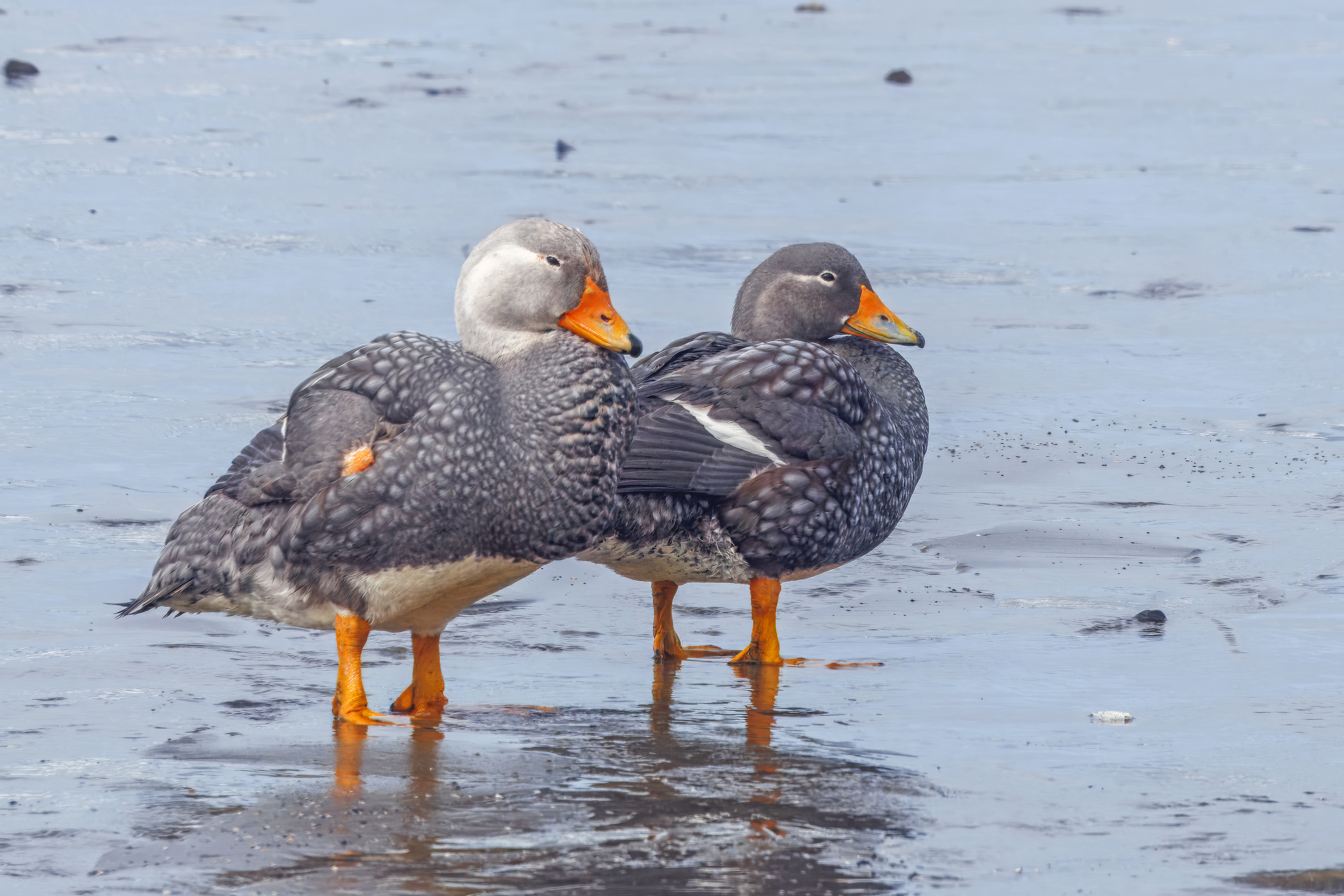
- Pair, male on left

Conservation status
- Least Concern (IUCN 3.1)

Scientific classification
- Kingdom: Animalia
- Phylum: Chordata
- Class: Aves
- Order: Anseriformes
- Family: Anatidae
- Genus: Tachyeres
- Species: T. pteneres

Binomial name
- Tachyeres pteneres (Forster, 1844)

= Fuegian steamer duck =

Species of bird

The flightless steamer-duck (Tachyeres pteneres), Magellanic flightless steamer-duck, or Fuegian steamer duck, is a flightless duck native to South America. It belongs to the steamer duck genus Tachyeres. It inhabits the rocky coasts and coastal islands from southern Chile and Chiloé to Tierra del Fuego, switching to the adjacent sheltered bays and lakes further inland when breeding.

== Description ==
This is the largest of the steamer duck species. It is a massively built waterfowl at 3.5–7 kg (7.7–15.4 lb) and 65–84 cm (26–33 in) in length, with the males noticeably larger than the females. Males weigh an average of 5.34 kg (11.8 lb) while females weigh around 4.2 kg (9.3 lb) on average. The wingspan is 85–110 cm (33–43 in), the wings being too small to functionally allow the birds to take flight. Instead, the wings are used like paddles to help skim rapidly across the surface of the water. This species outweighs any other wild species called "duck" and is about the same mass as the largest wild geese in the world, although this species is only distantly related to most true ducks (for example of the genus Anas). On males, the head and neck is blue-gray, with paler coloration crown and forehead. He has a narrow white eye-ring which continuing backwards as stripe and a reddish-brown throat. His abdomen, ventral area and undertail coverts are white and the tail is grey. Females are a darker gray-brown on the head and dark reddish on the throat. Her body and wings as males, but she may have brown/wine colouring on feathers. The juvenile is similar to the female but slightly duller colored.

== Life history ==
This species either nests near water obscured in dense, shrubby vegetation or in abandoned penguin nest burrows in September through December. Between 4 and 11 eggs are laid, with an average clutch of 9. The ivory eggs measure 8.2 cm × 5.6 cm (3.2 in × 2.2 in) and weigh around 167 g (5.9 oz). Incubation occurs for 28 to 40 days. The young fledge at 120–130 days and are driven from the parent's territory by their parents and form flocks with other ousted immature steamer ducks. They become sexually mature at 2 to 3 years of age. Adult males are known to be extremely aggressive during mating season, including towards other waterfowl, but may join mixed-species winter flocks without incident.

There are several potential predators of eggs and young birds: foxes, caracaras, gulls, skuas and giant petrels. In January 2009, a marine otter was seen preying on a chick of this species in Puñihuil. Healthy adults may have no natural predators. This species lives principally off of saltwater molluscs, crustaceans and small fish. During the breeding season, they tend to eat and feed their young small snails, insect larvae, amphipods and isopods.

This species is locally infamous for the aggressive disposition of adult males. Incidents have allegedly occurred where a raging male was placed by a misguided collector among adults of various other waterfowl species and killed all the other birds with its powerful, spurred wings.

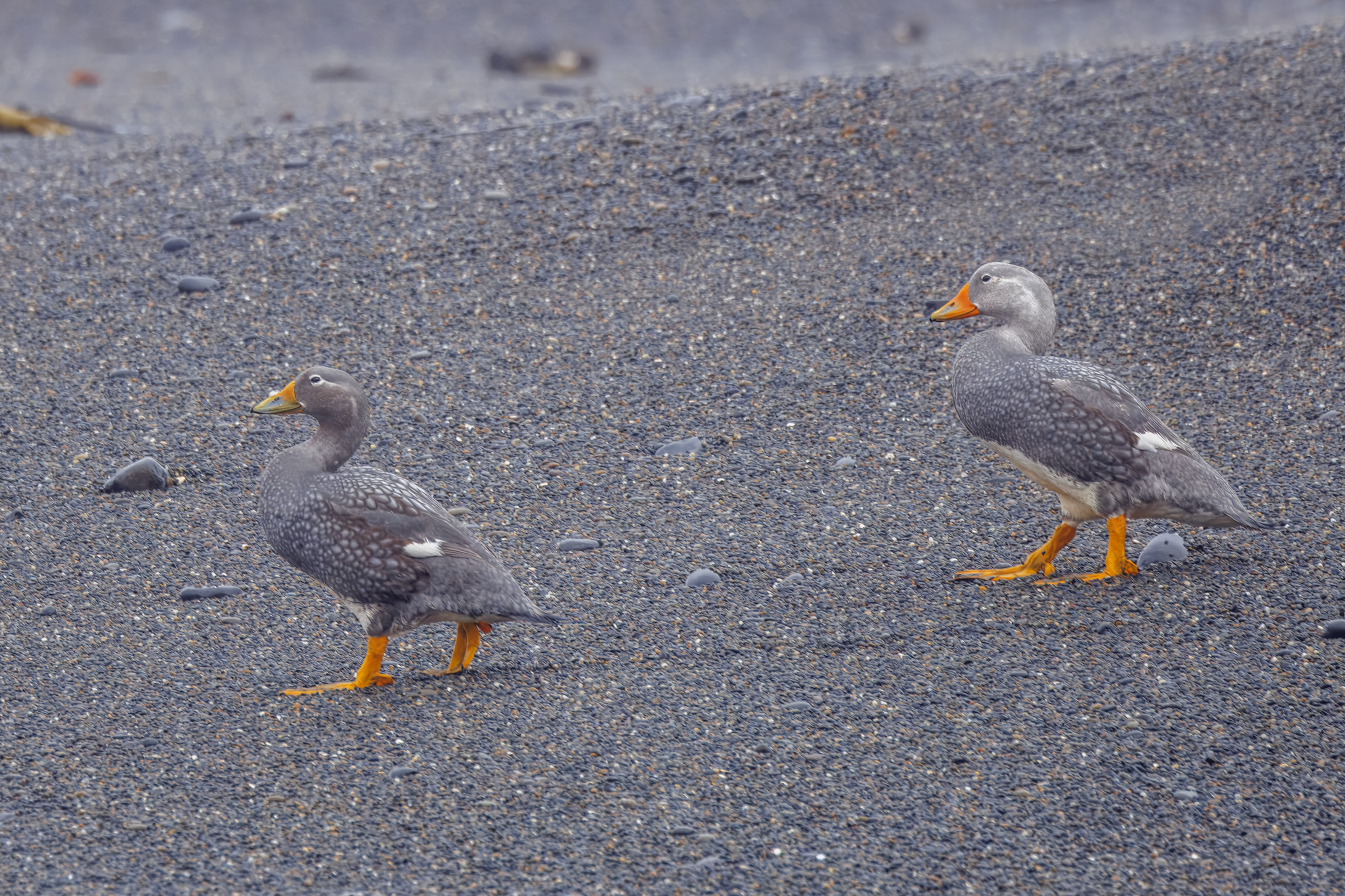

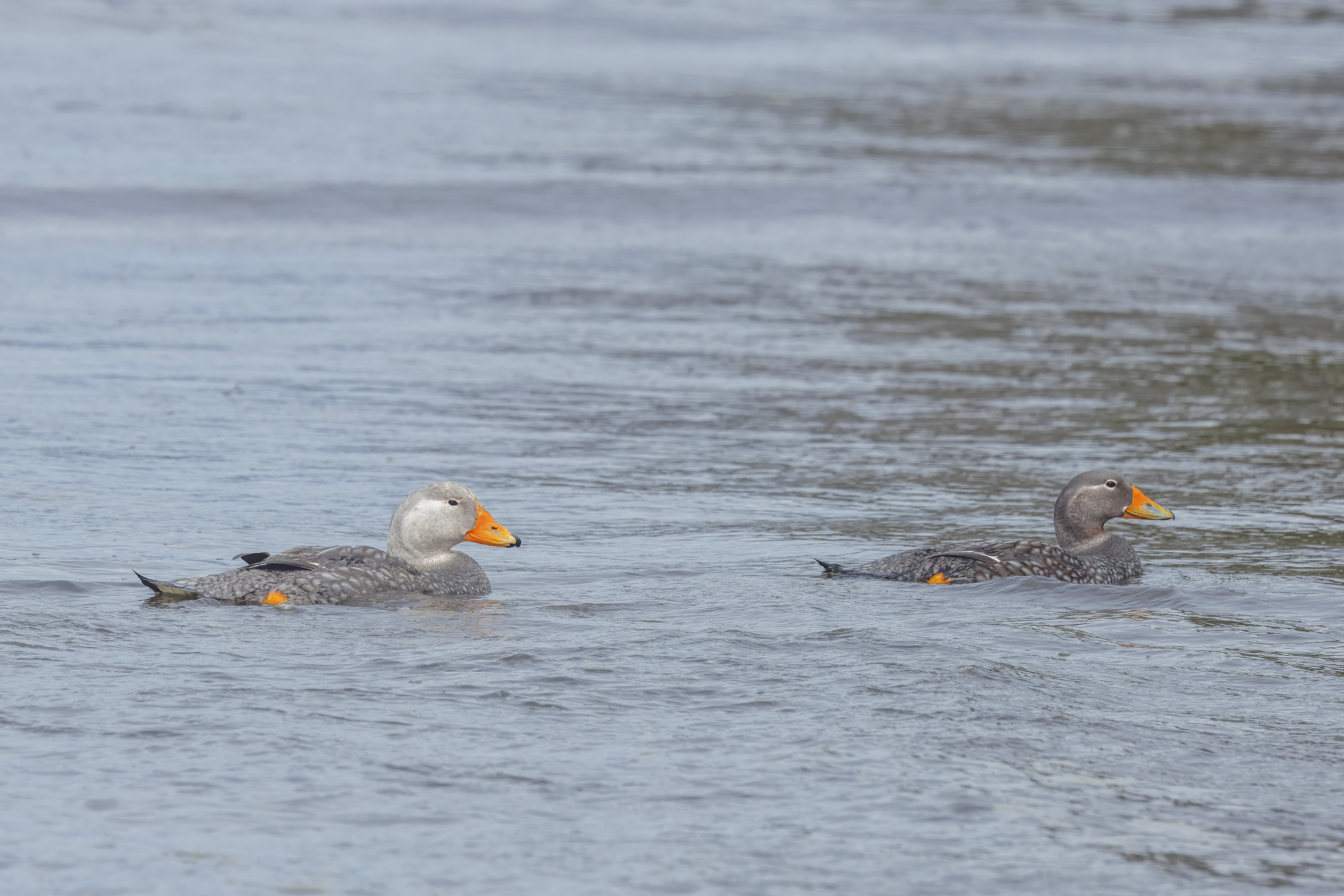
