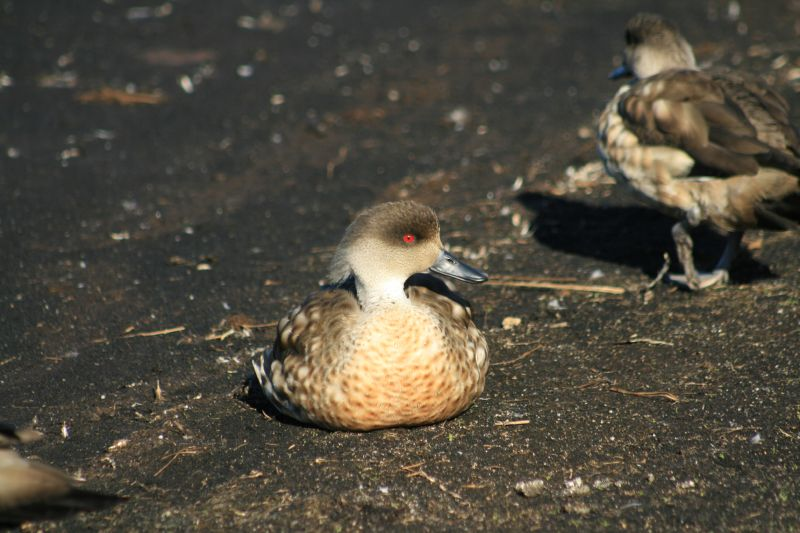

Scientific classification
- Kingdom: Animalia
- Phylum: Chordata
- Class: Aves
- Order: Anseriformes
- Family: Anatidae
- Genus: Lophonetta
- Species: L. specularioides
- Subspecies: L. s. specularioides

Trinomial name
- Lophonetta specularioides specularioides King, 1828

Synonyms
- Anas specularioides specularioides

= Patagonian crested duck =

Subspecies of duck native to South America

The Patagonian crested duck (Lophonetta specularioides specularioides), also known as the southern crested duck, or the grey duck in the Falkland Islands, is the nominate of two subspecies of the crested duck.

== Description ==
The duck has a grey chin, neck and face, with the body plumage a mixture of brown and grey feathers giving a mottled look. Its eyes are red with black pupils. The crown and the feathers surrounding the eyes are dark brown or blackish. The tail feathers are also dark, sometimes black. It has a black beak and dark grey to black legs and webbed feet. It moults twice a year and also has an annual wing feather moult. It is a medium-sized duck around 50–60 cm in length. Females and males weigh about 1 kg though usually the males are slightly larger. It is very similar to the other subspecies, the Andean crested duck, differing in being slightly smaller, with more distinctively mottled underparts, and a lighter purple speculum with green or bronze reflections. Although, some crested ducks can also have rather fat bodies that may lead to varying degrees of motor incoordination

Young ducks have smaller crests than the adults, or lack crests entirely. The faces of the young birds are browner than those of the adults; the abdomen is also much whiter and the mandible a pinkish colour.

== Distribution and habitat ==
The duck occurs in southern South America, where it is found in Chile, Argentina and the Falkland Islands. It may be found by the coast or in freshwater. It lives in marshland, swamps, lakes and pools, or in sheltered bays on the coast. It is non-migratory; in winter it finds a sheltered place to stay during the colder months. For high altitude and high latitude birds this usually involves dispersing along the South American coast.

== Behaviour ==
=== Breeding ===
The reproductive season of the duck varies according to geographical location. In the Andes it is mainly between January and March, whereas in more southern areas it tends to be later, between October and December. Preferred nesting habitat is on the ground in tall grass or shrubbery on small islets or lake shores, but occasionally further away from water. The nest is built by a solitary pair and is made up of vegetation and lined with their soft breast feathers.

A clutch of eggs is made up of between five and eight cream-coloured eggs, which weigh about 56 g and are 63 x 43 mm in size. A double brood is quite common. Incubation is undertaken by the female, and takes about 30 days, following which the eggs hatch synchronously. Once hatched both parents tend to the ducklings. They fledge at about 10–11 weeks old.

=== Feeding ===
The duck eats aquatic invertebrates such as insects and their larvae, crustaceans and molluscs. It also eats small amounts of aquatic plants such as the filamentous algae common in many ponds. The diet for the young is much the same as their parents. To get their food the ducks dive for algae and invertebrates at the bottom of waterbodies. Diet varies between fresh and salt water habitats, as well as seasonally.

== Status and conservation ==
The Patagonian crested duck is not endangered. Although its global population is unknown, there are thought to be around 10,000 breeding pairs in the Falkland Islands. Its sibling subspecies, the Andean crested duck, is extremely rare even in captive collections.

=== Predators ===
One of the main predators of the Patagonian crested duck is the black-crowned night heron. Adult ducks have few other predators though the younger ducklings are subject to predation by brown skuas.
