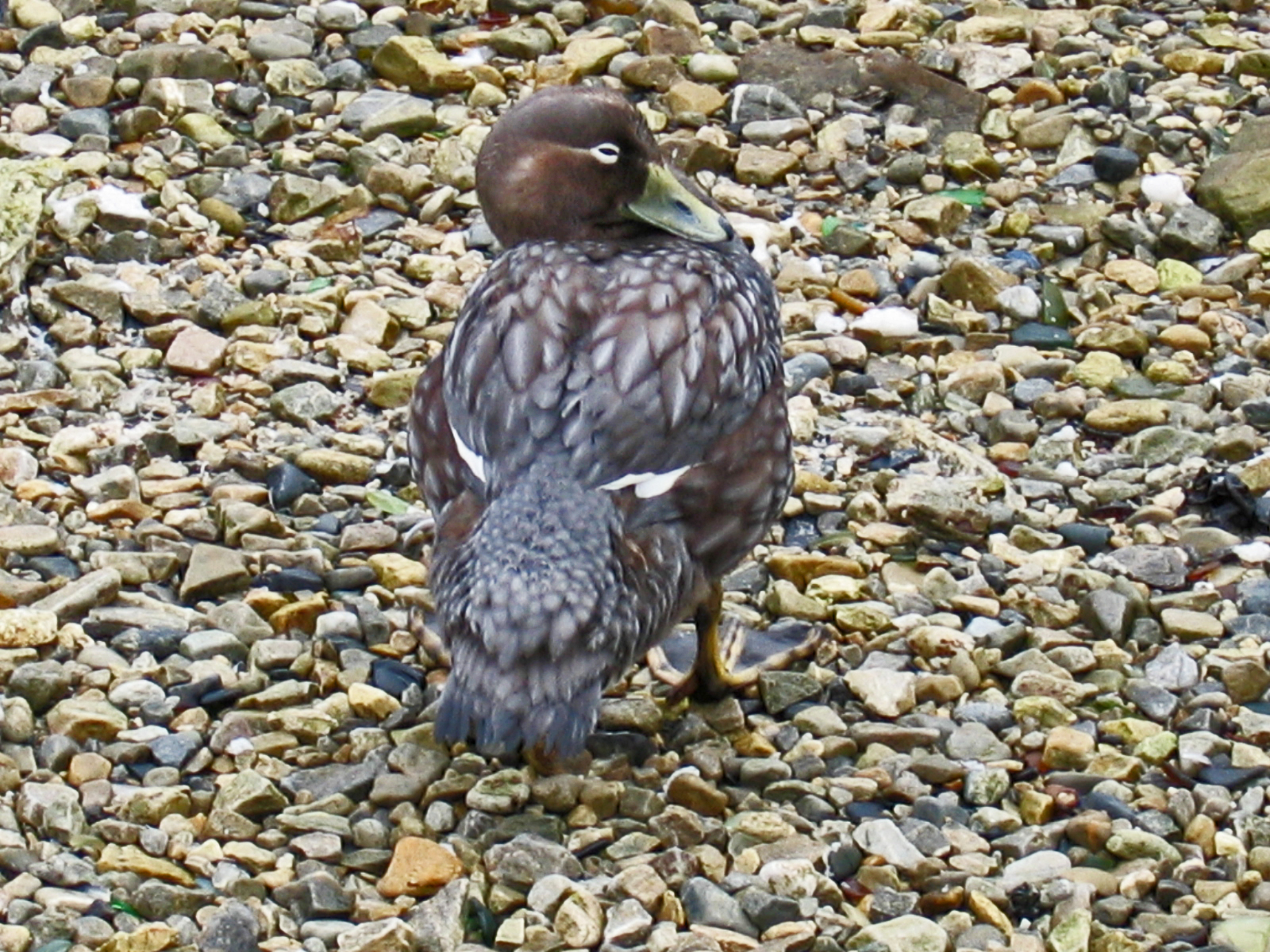
- Female

Conservation status
- Least Concern (IUCN 3.1)

Scientific classification
- Kingdom: Animalia
- Phylum: Chordata
- Class: Aves
- Order: Anseriformes
- Family: Anatidae
- Genus: Tachyeres
- Species: T. brachypterus

Binomial name
- Tachyeres brachypterus (Latham, 1790)

Synonyms
- Anas cinereus Gmelin, 1788; Anas brachyptera Latham, 1790; Tachyeres brachyapterus (Latham, 1790)

= Falkland steamer duck =

Species of bird

The Falkland steamer duck (Tachyeres brachypterus) is a species of flightless duck found on the Falkland Islands in the South Atlantic Ocean. The steamer ducks get their name from their unconventional swimming behaviour in which they flap their wings and feet on the water in a motion reminiscent of an old paddle steamer. The Falkland steamer duck is one of only two bird species endemic to the Falkland Islands, the other being Cobb's wren.

== Taxonomy and systematics ==
The Falkland steamer duck is part of the order Anseriformes and the family Anatidae, alongside ducks, geese, and swans. It is in the genus Tachyeres with the three other species of steamer ducks, all found in South America. The Falkland steamer duck is most closely related to the flying steamer duck, which can also be found in and around the Falkland Islands. It is believed that they might still be able to interbreed. A study from 2012 established that these two species are genetically indistinguishable. However, they tend to reproduce in different geographic areas. Possible hybridization could account for the genetic similarities between the two species. Some scientists have proposed that the flying steamer duck and the Falkland steamer duck should be a single species, but more evidence is needed to settle that question.

== Evolution of flightlessness ==
Steamer ducks are a young group from an evolutionarily point of view and have a last common ancestor believed to have lived about 2 million years ago. This family is of particular interest to scientists because it contains both species capable and incapable of flight. Scientists believe that they are witnessing the evolution of flightlessness. In fact, both the Falkland steamer duck and the closely related flying steamer duck contain genetic sequences associated with both flight-capable wings and flightless wings. This would suggest that the Falkland steamer ducks have just recently become flightless. However, it is difficult to determine if these specific wing traits have directly evolved because of flightlessness or to support steaming behaviour because these two characteristics appear to have evolved at the same time. Regardless of these unknowns, the fact that this species has recently become flightless allows scientists to identify specific genes and reconstruct the evolutionary steps necessary to evolve flightlessness with a level of detail that cannot be matched when working with fossils. In short, the Falkland steamer duck is a promising model organism to study and understand the process behind the evolution of flightlessness in birds.

== Description ==
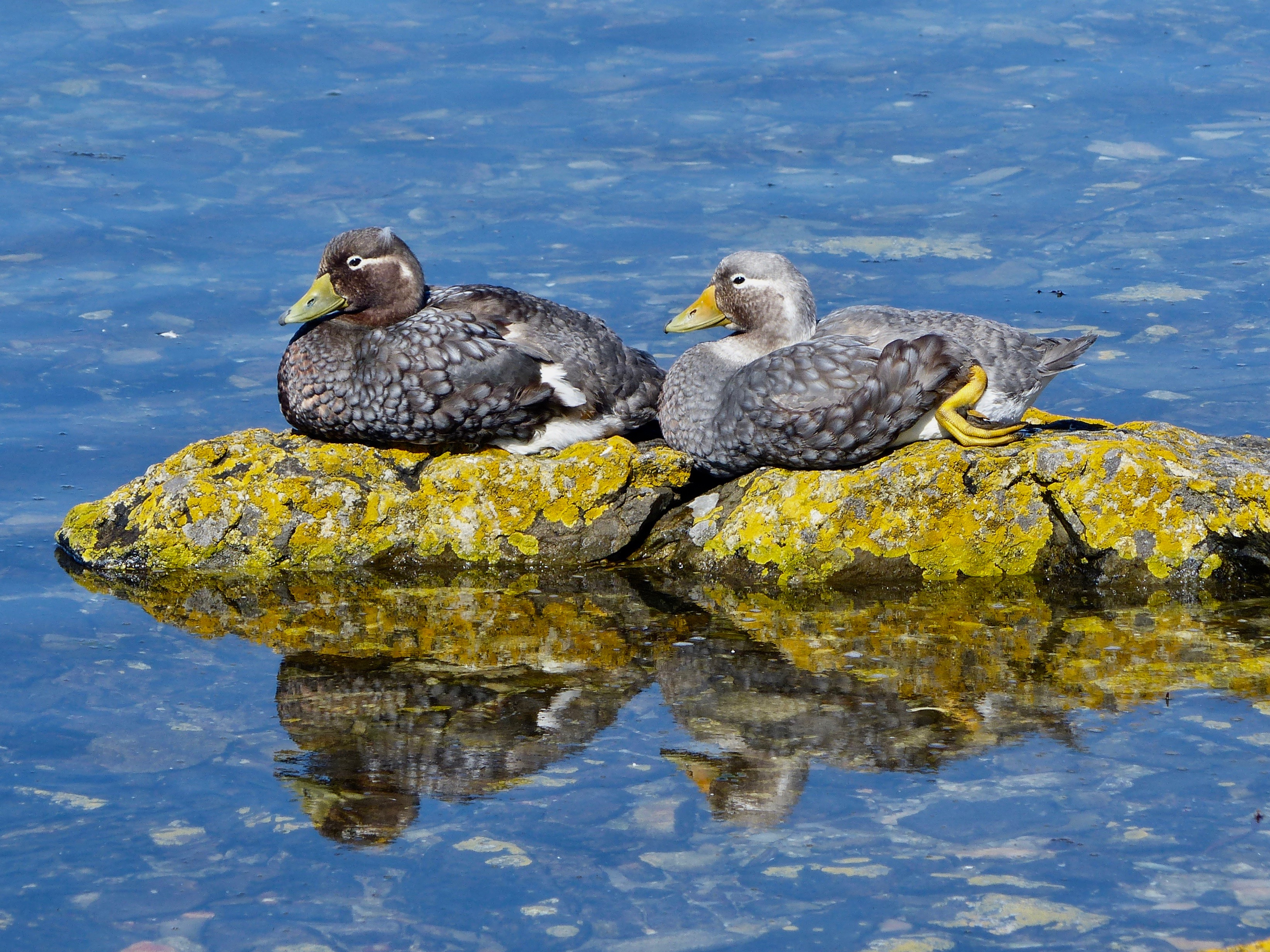
Falkland steamer duck pair at Whale Bone Cove, Falkland Islands.

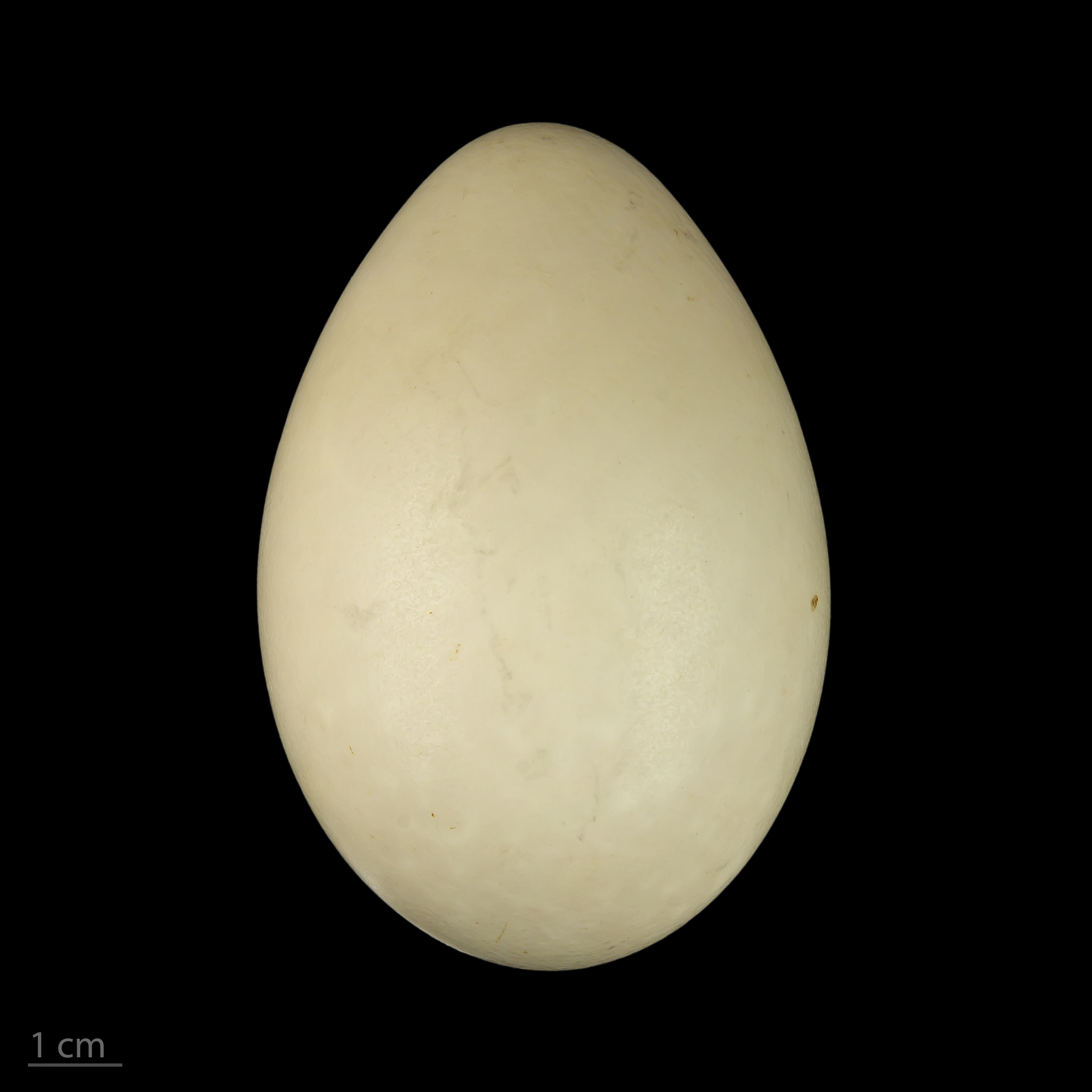
Tachyeres brachypterus - MHNT

The Falkland steamer duck measures between 61 and 74 cm in length and has a wingspan of 84 to 94 cm. It is a fairly large species of duck with males weighing between 3300 and 4800 g, and females between 2900 and 4196 g. The male's plumage is brown to grey with a contrasting light grey-white head. They have a distinctive orange bill. The wings have white secondary feathers and large, featherless spurs. The stubby tail is brown-grey. The eyes are brown with a contrasting white eye-ring and a faint white eye-streak. The females are darker in colour with a brown neck and head and an olive green beak. Females also have a distinctive white eye ring and a white line behind their eyes. Both males and females have characteristic yellow-orange feet. Juveniles can be differentiated from females by the black marks and overall paler colour of their feet. They also lack or have a very reduced white line behind their eyes.

This species is visually similar to another steamer duck species with which it shares its range: the flying steamer duck. Although they are difficult to tell apart in the field, the Falkland steamer duck has shorter wings and tail and a thicker neck and bill. Finally, as its name implies, the flying steamer duck is capable of flight while the Falkland steamer duck is strictly flightless. This last characteristic is difficult to see in the field because the flying steamer duck seldom flies and is often seen walking or swimming.

== Historical description ==
Charles Darwin devoted two paragraphs to this bird (or the similar flying steamer duck) in The Voyage of the Beagle, having observed them at the Falkland Islands in 1833:

In these islands a great loggerheaded duck or goose (Anas brachyptera), which sometimes weighs twenty-two pounds, is very abundant. These birds were in former days called, from their extraordinary manner of paddling and splashing upon the water, race-horses; but now they are named, much more appropriately, steamers. Their wings are too small and weak to allow of flight, but by their aid, partly swimming and partly flapping the surface of the water, they move very quickly. The manner is something like that by which the common house-duck escapes when pursued by a dog; but I am nearly sure that the steamer moves its wings alternately, instead of both together, as in other birds. These clumsy, loggerheaded ducks make such a noise and splashing, that the effect is exceedingly curious.

Thus we find in South America three birds which use their wings for other purposes besides flight; the penguins as fins, the steamer as paddles, and the ostrich as sails: and the Apteryx of New Zealand, as well as its gigantic extinct prototype the Deinornis, possess only rudimentary representatives of wings. The steamer is able to dive only to a very short distance. It feeds entirely on shell-fish from the kelp and tidal rocks: hence the beak and head, for the purpose of breaking them, are surprisingly heavy and strong: the head is so strong that I have scarcely been able to fracture it with my geological hammer; and all our sportsmen soon discovered how tenacious these birds were of life. When in the evening pluming themselves in a flock, they make the same odd mixture of sounds which bull-frogs do within the tropics.

— Charles Darwin, The Voyage of the Beagle

== Habitat and distribution ==
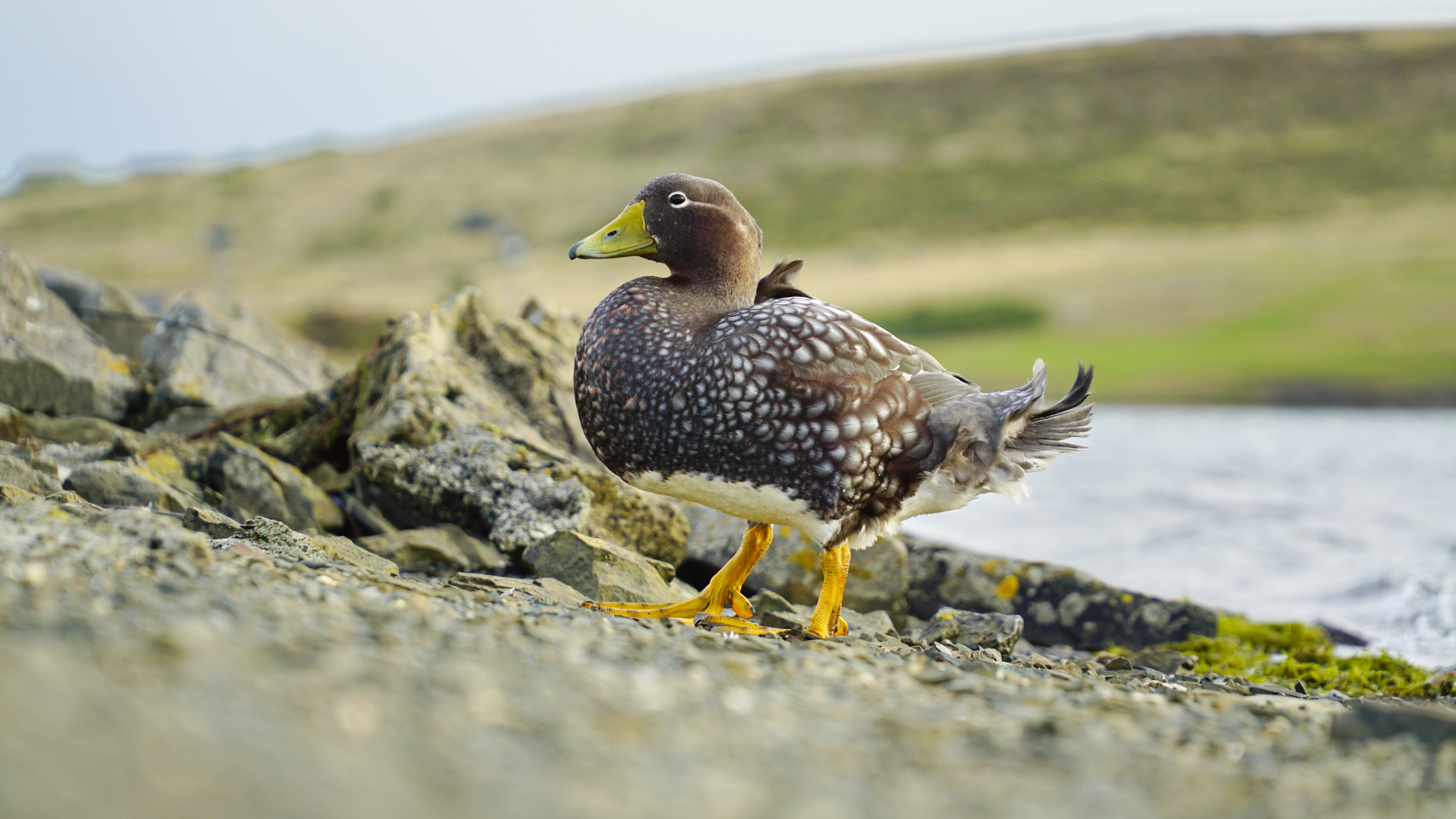
The Falkland steamer duck is primarily found on rugged coastlines.

The species' distribution is limited to the Falkland Islands in the South Atlantic Ocean. These ducks are year-round residents of the islands and the surrounding archipelago, and can be found mainly on rugged shores and in sheltered bays. Falkland steamer ducks also venture inland to freshwater ponds up to 400 m from the coast.

== Behavior ==
This species spends most of its time in small family groups composed of the female, the male and the chicks. However, non-breeding adults and juveniles might gather in larger groups of up to 300. These gatherings can happen at any time of the year and their purpose remains unknown.

=== Vocalization ===
The Falkland steamer duck's vocalizations are similar to those of the flying steamer duck. Males can be heard year-round, but they are especially vocal during the breeding season, during which they use their vocalization to defend their territory. Their call consists of loud rasping whistles and repeated sharp ticking notes. Females usually sing with the males and produce deeper grunts. This bird is loud and can easily be heard on and around the shores of the Falklands.

=== Diet ===
The Falkland steamer duck feeds mainly on marine mollusks and, occasionally, on crustaceans. Although they can upend when feeding in shallower waters, they mainly dive to find their preys on the sea floor. They used their small wings and large feet to effectively propel themselves in the water. Interestingly, they have been observed to feed collectively with many individuals diving at the same time.

=== Reproduction ===
The breeding season lasts from mid September to the end of December, but breeding can take place year-round. Adults breed in single pairs on and around the coastline. Males become very territorial and fights are common. Males and sometimes females will use the spurs on their wings to strike challengers. These fights are known for their violence and can result in severe injury or even death. Once mating has occurred, females lay between 4 and 12 eggs in down-lined nests and incubate them for about 34 days. The males stay with the female to defend the nest but are not involved in the incubation process. Every day, the female carefully covers the eggs with plant material before leaving the nest for 15 to 30 minutes to bathe and preen. The nest is usually located in tall grass, piles of sea weed, rocks, and even in unoccupied Magellanic penguin burrows. Chicks weigh about 83 g upon hatching and stay with the adults for 12 weeks. When they hatch and for the first 12 weeks, the chicks are covered in brown and white down. They have distinctive white markings on the side of their head. Around the 12-week mark, chicks get their first plumage. Sexual maturity is reached after 14 to 24 months. Adults can live for up to 20 years old in captivity but there is no information on the longevity of wild individuals.

=== Predation ===
The adult Falkland steamer duck does not have many predators. Predation by sea lions and seals is rare but has been documented. The main predation pressure is on fledglings, which are routinely picked up by kelp gulls and skuas. Egg harvesting used to be common in the islands, but humans have since abandoned the practice.

== Conservation status ==
The species is currently classified as Least Concern. During surveys between 1983 and 1993, between 9000 and 16,000 breeding pairs were recorded and the population was estimated at 27,000 to 48,000 individuals. A survey from 1997 estimated the population at 32,000 individuals. A recent study has shed some light on the negative effect of invasive species on shore bird populations in the Falklands: rat-invested islands have lower numbers of many birds, including steamer ducks. Another possible source of concern comes from oil spills. The species has a limited distribution, and its food supply could be severely affected by a large-scale release of oil in and around the Falklands. Although these anticipated threats should be considered, the population is currently stable and there is no immediate source of concern for this species.
