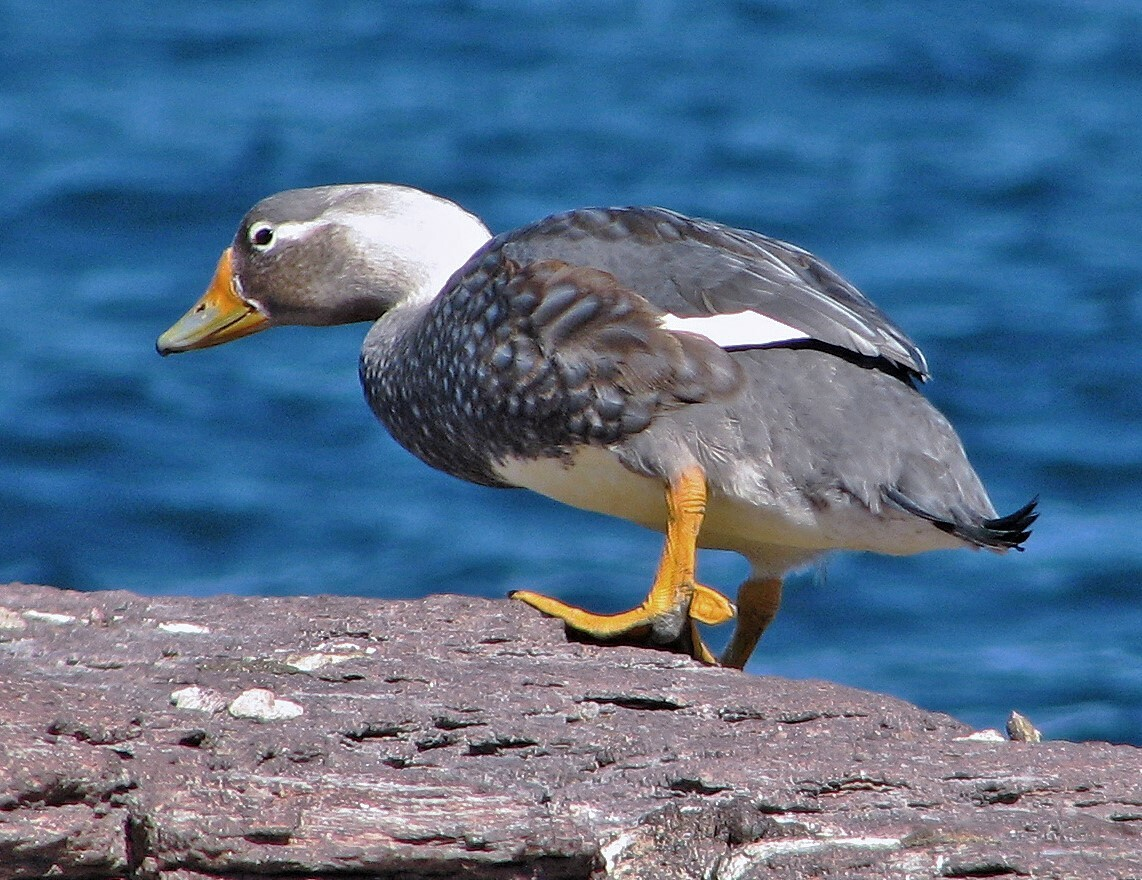

Conservation status
- Vulnerable (IUCN 3.1)

Scientific classification
- Kingdom: Animalia
- Phylum: Chordata
- Class: Aves
- Order: Anseriformes
- Family: Anatidae
- Genus: Tachyeres
- Species: T. leucocephalus

Binomial name
- Tachyeres leucocephalus Humphrey & Thompson, 1981

= Chubut steamer duck =

Species of bird

The Chubut steamer duck or white-headed flightless steamer duck (Tachyeres leucocephalus) is a flightless duck endemic to Argentina.

It is the most recently recognized species of steamer duck, being described only in 1981. This is because it is only found along a rather small and sparsely populated stretch of coast around the Golfo San Jorge in southern Chubut and northern Santa Cruz Provinces, and because steamer ducks in general look fairly similar in plumage.

== Description ==
Adult male Chubut steamer ducks have white heads with a bright yellow/orange bill with a black nail. Their webs and feet are yellow/orange with black claws. The rest of their plumage includes mostly grey bodies and white bellies. While the male is molting his bill turns to a duller yellow/orange.

Adult female Chubut steamer ducks have brown heads and necks with small white line going from the back of the eye to the fore-neck. Their bills have a greenish/yellow color.

The Adult female Chubut steamer duck looks very similar to the juvenile.

== Range ==
The Chubut steamer duck was originally thought to only be found strictly in the southern coast of the Chubut province in Argentina. However it is now known to have a larger range from the southern portion of the San Matías Gulf to Islote Chato. The crucial populations for this species are found in Bahía San Gregorio (Argentina) [1], Bahía Melo [2], and Caleta Malaspina[3]. These three crucial populations are all located in the San Jorge Gulf.

== Diet ==
The Chubut steamer duck's diet consists of molluscs and crustaceans which it gets through diving, upending and dabbling like most other ducks. They also are known to look on land for food, but stay close to the coast.

== Breeding ==
The breeding season goes from October to February with nests made out of grass, sticks and litter from the high tide. Their nests, typically containing 5-6 eggs, can be found densely clumped together or alone.

This species breeds on 500 km of coastline from the Chubut River mouth to the Chubut and Santa Cruz province boundary. There are an estimated 3,700 breeding pairs of the duck species. In a study of 292 km of continental coastline and 59 km of island coastline from 2004 to 2006 (three breeding seasons) 170 nests were found and out of those found nests 169 were found to be on islands/islets and only one on continental coastline. All of the nests were found in bays or inlets with shallow water protected from strong winds or large waves. The calmer waters allow better conditions for foraging for food and are easier for the chicks to navigate. Chubut steamer ducks are ground nesting birds and prefer nesting areas with at least 1 meter squared of shrub cover. Ground nesting on islands make it easier to protect their young from aerial predators (shrub cover) and from terrestrial predators who can not swim out to the island.

== Threats ==
Chubut steamer Ducks face many threats such as oil exploration, habitat destruction, predation, and invasive species. Other forms of threats they face are from guano, macroalgae and egg harvesting. There have been three major oil spills in the past 30 years that affected the ducks breeding areas by directly being coated with oil and polluting the substrate that the ducks make their nests on. The three main invasive species affecting the Chubut steamer ducks are Carcinus maenas (Green Crab), Wakame (Asian Kelp or Undaria pinnatifida) and Balanus glandula (Acorn Barnacle). These invasive species indirectly affect the duck by altering the environment that it lives in.

Sub-marine predators of this species include the South American sea lion (Otaria byronia) and Killer whale (Orcinus orca).

The two species that are commonly observed preying on Chubut Steamer duck eggs are the kelp gull (Larus dominicanus) and crested caracara (Caracara plancus). Egg harvesting has only been reported in low numbers and is not as large of a threat as others mentioned.

== Escape methods ==
Due to the Chubut Steamer ducks being flightless, they need to have different methods of escaping predators besides flying. To do this they can swim, dive or steam. Steaming is a faster unique way to swim for these flightless birds. When they steam they use their wings as oars and their feet to generate turbulence. They can obtain speeds up to 24 km/h when steaming.

== Outlook ==
When the species was first discovered in 1988, even though there was only one population, they were listed as lower risk/least concern due to believing the population was not declining. Over the years the population changed to lower risk/near threatened in 1994, to near threatened in 2004 and finally to vulnerable in 2012 with a decreasing current population trend. The total population is estimated to have 5,300-5,600 individuals with 3,400-3,700 being mature.

Around half of their population (46%) is protected by the Interjurisdictional Marine Park in the San Jorge Gulf. The UNESCO Biosphere Reserve also has included the breeding range of the Chubut steamer duck in its program.

Programs to keep oil tankers and other large ships that may cause harm to the Chubut steamer duck out of the ducks range along with programs to minimize human disturbance and coastal development of breeding grounds have been proposed.
