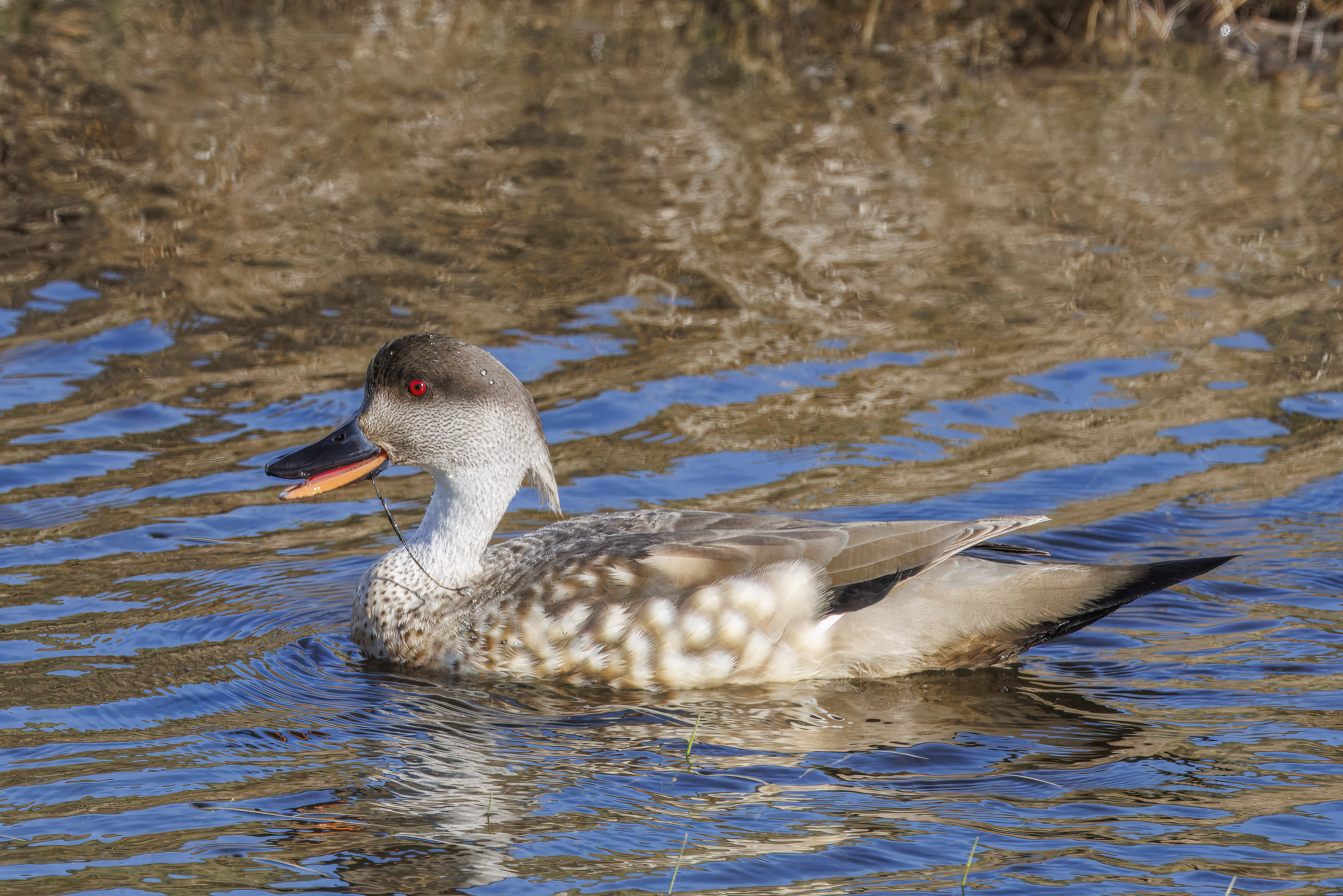
- In Torres del Paine, Chile

Conservation status
- Least Concern (IUCN 3.1)

Scientific classification
- Kingdom: Animalia
- Phylum: Chordata
- Class: Aves
- Order: Anseriformes
- Family: Anatidae
- Subfamily: Anatinae
- Genus: Lophonetta; Riley, 1914
- Species: L. specularioides

Binomial name
- Lophonetta specularioides (King, PP, 1828)

Subspecies
- Lophonetta specularioides alticola Ménégaux, 1909 Andean crested duck; Lophonetta specularioides specularioides (King, 1828) southern crested duck

Synonyms
- Anas cristata

= Crested duck =

Species of duck native to South America

The crested duck or South American crested duck (Lophonetta specularioides) is a species of duck native to South America, belonging to the monotypic genus Lophonetta. It is sometimes included in Anas, but it belongs to a South American clade that diverged early in dabbling duck evolution. There are two subspecies: L. specularioides alticola (Andean crested duck) and L. specularioides specularioides (Patagonian crested duck). The Patagonian crested duck is also called the southern crested duck and its range lies in the Falklands, Chile, and Argentina.

== Description ==
The crested duck is a medium-sized waterfowl species, with adult males reaching up to just over a kilogram. Males and females look similar, with males having a slightly more prominent crest than females. The feathers of the mantle, back and scapulars are dark brown with pale centers, giving a mottled appearance. The abdomen, flanks and tail coverts are light gray, with the tail itself being distinctly elongated and black. The upperwing is gray brown to light brown, with the secondaries having an iridescent coppery to greenish sheen, with a broad back band behind, narrowly edged with white. Juveniles are similar but lack crests, have light brown faces, and paler abdomens than adults.

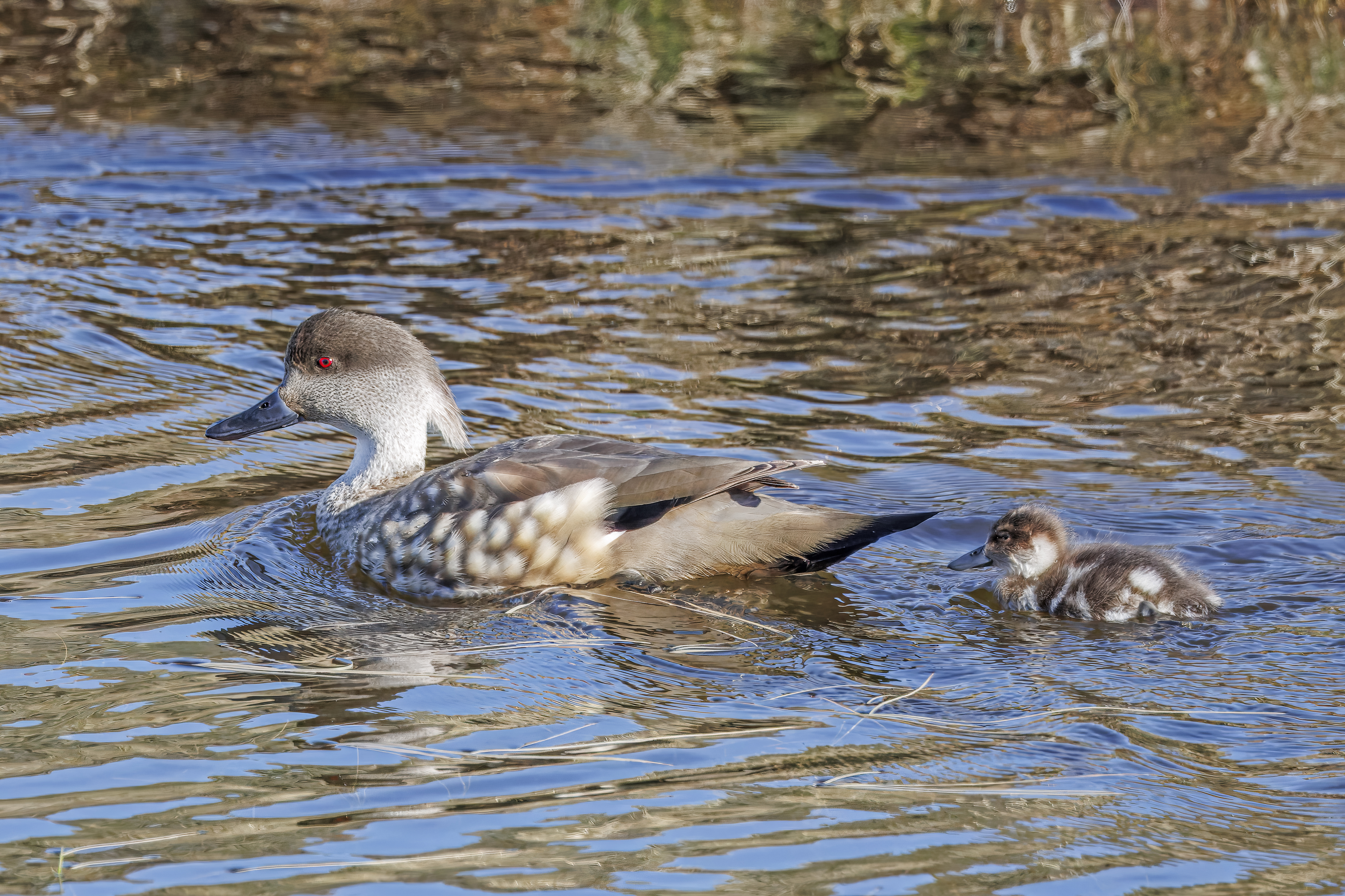
with chick

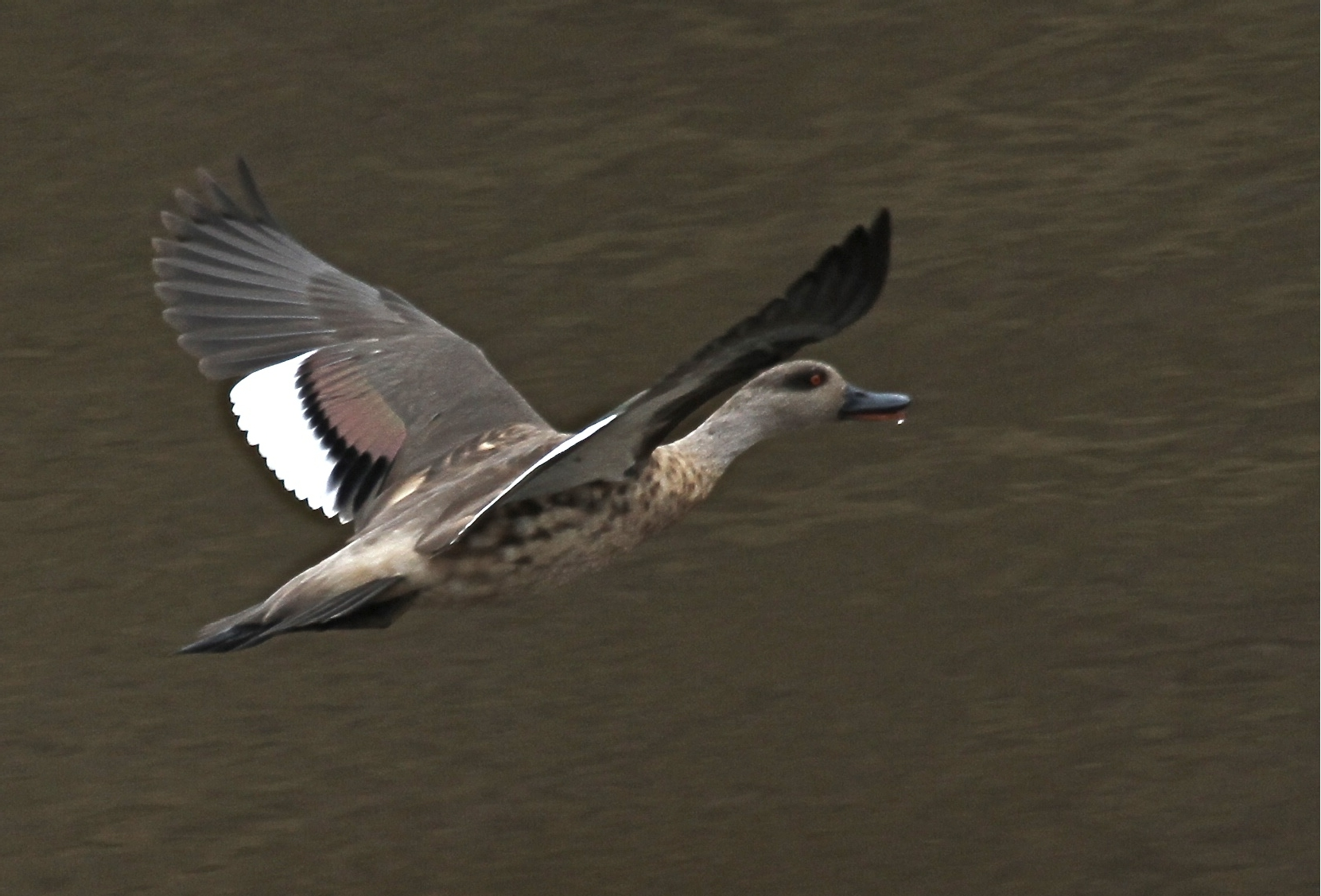
at ~4000 m (~13,100 ft) in Peru

== Distribution and habitat ==
Crested ducks are endemic to South America. The two subspecies occupy different elevations in the Andes, with Lophonetta s. alticola occurring from 2,500–4,800 metres (8,200–15,700 ft) from Peru to central Chile and Lophonetta s. specularioides occurring below 1,500 metres (4,900 ft) in the southern Andes near Patagonia and the Falkland Islands. The two subspecies co-occur in a zone of intermediate elevational habitats in Mendoza, Argentina and Talca, Chile.

The crested duck is found in lakes, marshes, and grassy areas from shallow coastal bays to high elevation lakes. In the Altiplano, they gather in turbid, alkaline lakes with large concentrations of zooplankton. They reside in sheltered bays and on beaches along the coast, where they forage for clams and other marine amphipods among rocks and kelp beds

== Behavior ==
=== Social behavior ===
Crested ducks are non-gregarious, flocking only in areas of unusually high food supplies. Generally pairs will expel others of their own species as well as alien species from their foraging areas. For these reasons they are considered highly territorial

=== Breeding ===
Nesting birds are found almost throughout the year, depending on location within the range of crested duck. In the high elevations of the Andes, active nests can be found throughout the summer from October to April. The season is shorter in Patagonia and the Falklands, with nests found from September to January. Two broods per year are common, but three may occur as well.

Nests are on the ground, close to water and usually built among grass or ferns for reduced visibility. Eggs are cream colored, and a clutch may have from five to eight eggs. The incubation period lasts about 30 days. Only the female incubates the eggs, but males play an important role in the ducklings early development. Crested Ducks are monogamous and mating pairs exhibit high levels of cooperation which allow the species to live in proximity to other species such as gulls and skuas.

=== Diet and foraging ===
Crested ducks are dabbling ducks, which means they sieve through mud, silt, or gravel to find macroinvertebrates. Their diet, which is highly dependent on habitat, ranges from zooplankton, clams, kelp, and other macroinvertebrates.

== Status and conservation ==
Crested duck is one of the most common duck species in the Tierra del Fuego and has been evaluated as Least Concern
