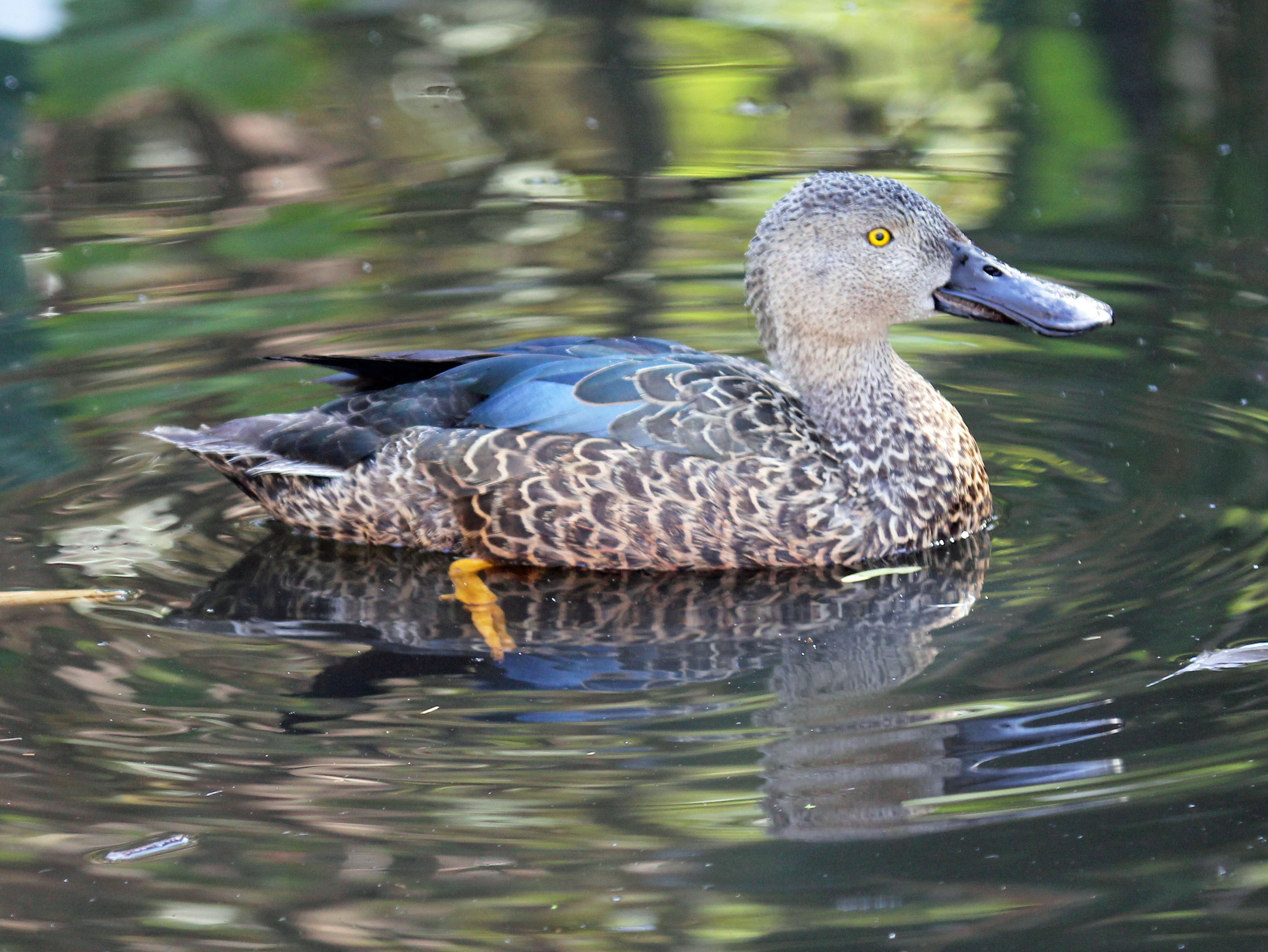
- Male
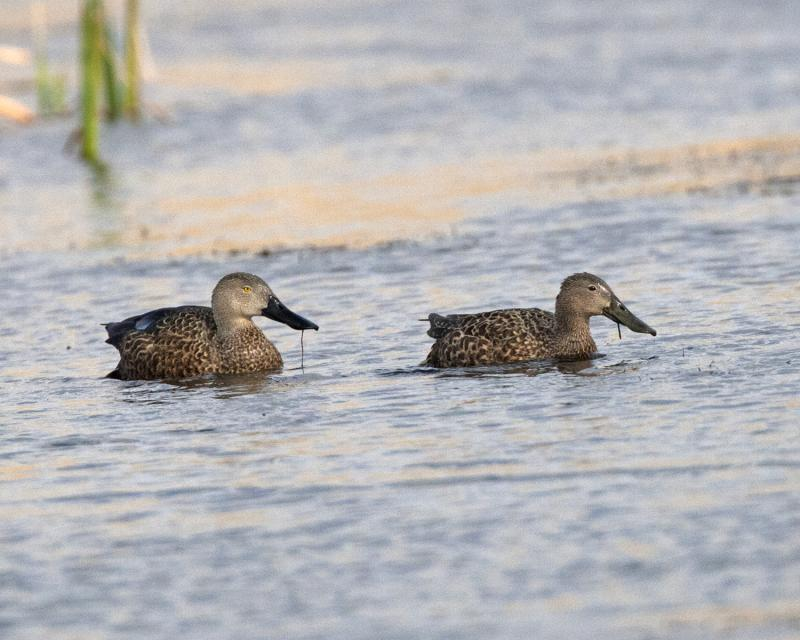
- Female

Conservation status
- Least Concern (IUCN 3.1)

Scientific classification
- Kingdom: Animalia
- Phylum: Chordata
- Class: Aves
- Order: Anseriformes
- Family: Anatidae
- Genus: Spatula
- Species: S. smithii

Binomial name
- Spatula smithii Hartert, 1891

Synonyms
- Anas smithii (Hartert, 1891)

= Cape shoveler =

Species of bird

The Cape shoveler or Cape shoveller (Spatula smithii) is a species of dabbling duck of the genus Spatula. It is resident in South Africa, and uncommon further north in Namibia, Botswana, Zimbabwe, southern Angola, Lesotho, Mozambique, and Zambia.

This 51–53 cm long duck is non-migratory, but undertakes some local seasonal movements. It is gregarious when not breeding, and may then form large flocks.

This species has a large spatulate bill. Adults have speckled grey-brown plumage and dull orange legs. As with many southern hemisphere ducks, the sexes appear similar, but the male has a paler head than the female, a pale blue forewing separated from the green speculum by a white border, and yellow eyes. The female's forewing is grey.

Cape shoveler can only be confused with a vagrant female northern shoveler, but is much darker and stockier than that species.

It is a bird of open wetlands, such as wet grassland or marshes with some emergent vegetation, and feeds by dabbling for plant food, often by swinging its bill from side to side to strain food from the water. This bird also eats molluscs and insects in the nesting season. The nest is a shallow depression on the ground, lined with plant material and down, and usually close to water.

This is a fairly quiet species. The male has rarr and cawick calls, whereas the female has a quack.

The Cape shoveler was described by the German ornithologist Ernst Hartert in 1891 under the present binomial name Spatula smithii. The specific epithet commemorates the Scottish zoologist Andrew Smith.

The IUCN Red List sets the conservation status of the Cape shoveler as least concern.
