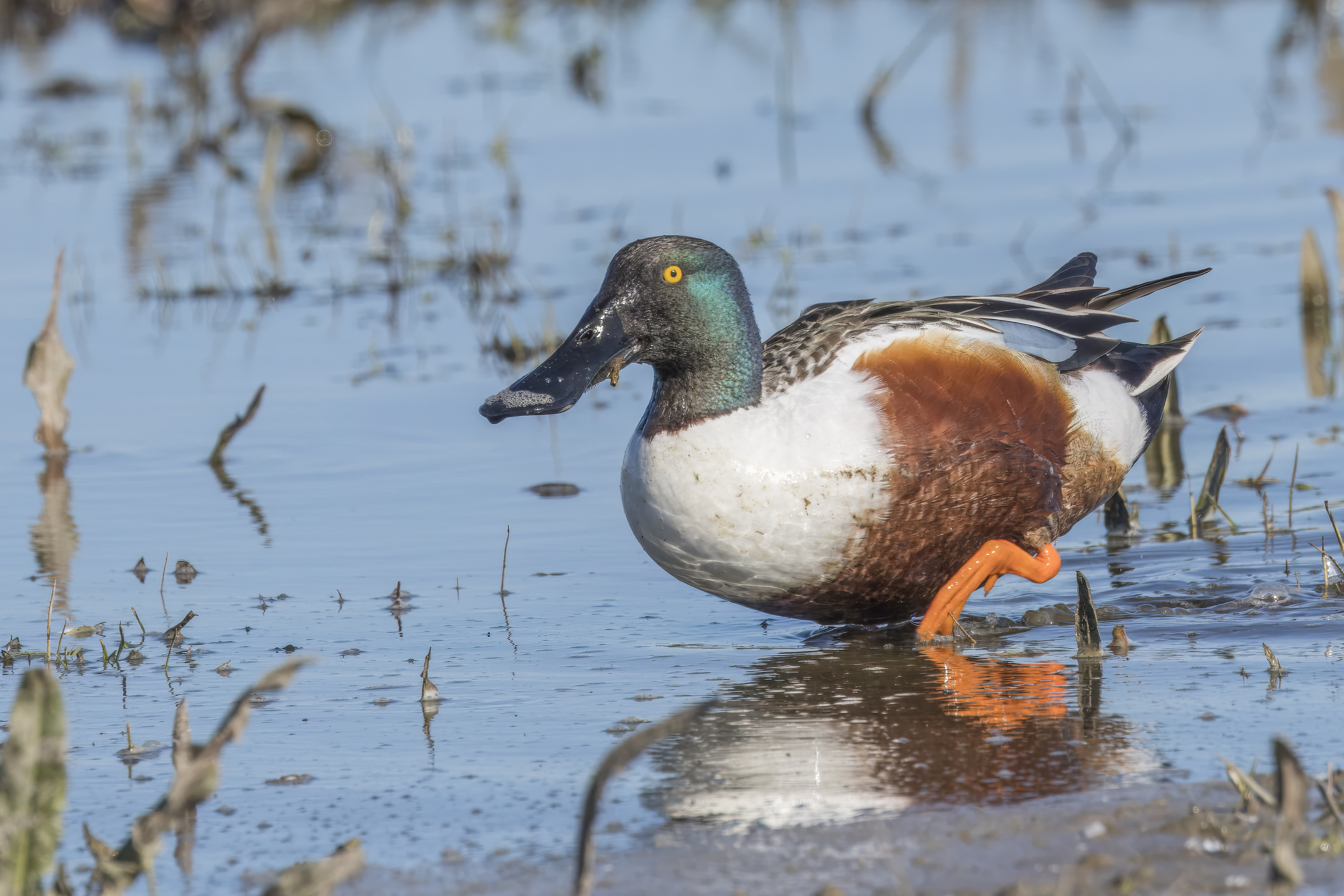
- Male
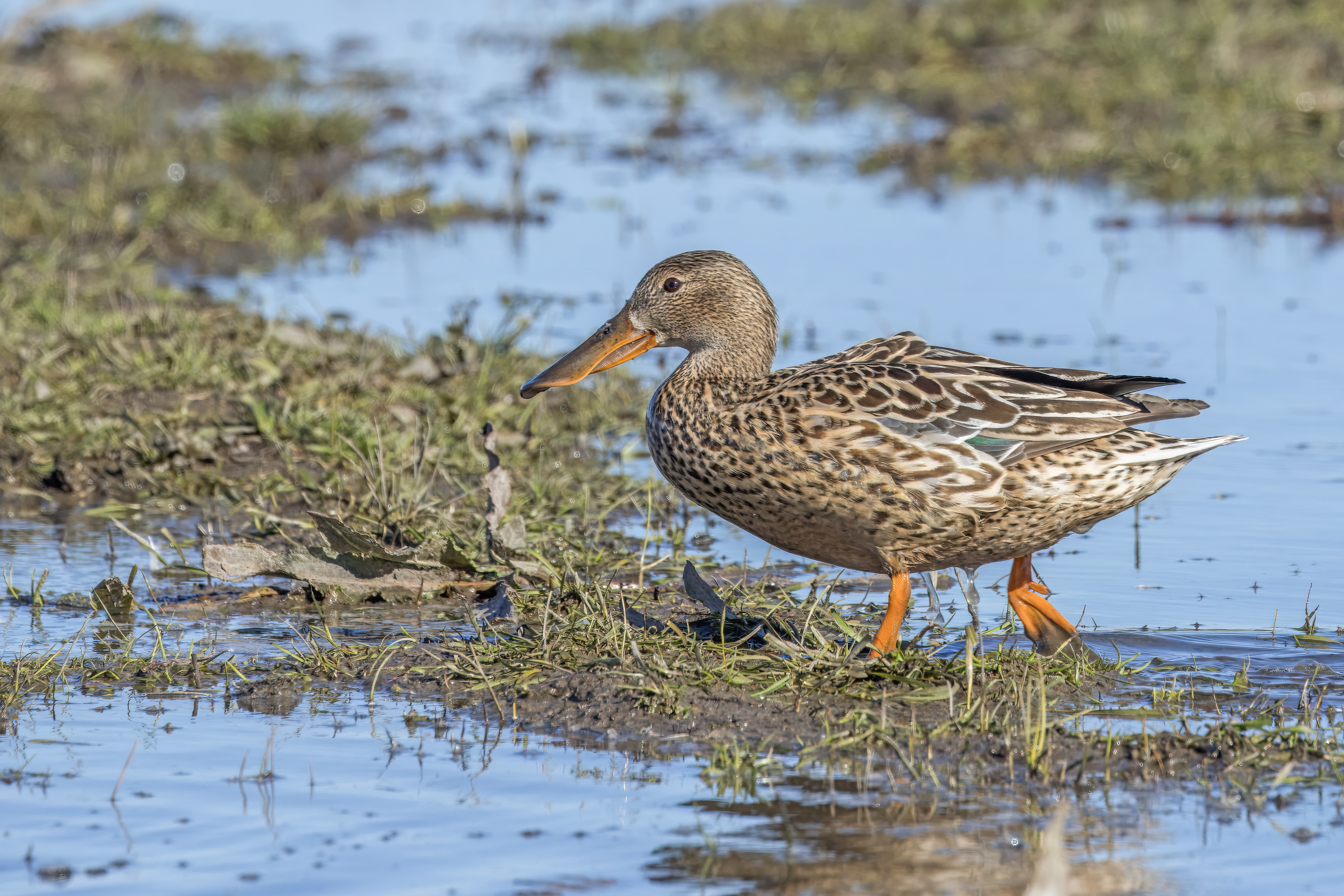
- Female both at Marken, Netherlands

Conservation status
- Least Concern (IUCN 3.1)

Scientific classification
- Kingdom: Animalia
- Phylum: Chordata
- Class: Aves
- Order: Anseriformes
- Family: Anatidae
- Genus: Spatula
- Species: S. clypeata

Binomial name
- Spatula clypeata (Linnaeus, 1758)
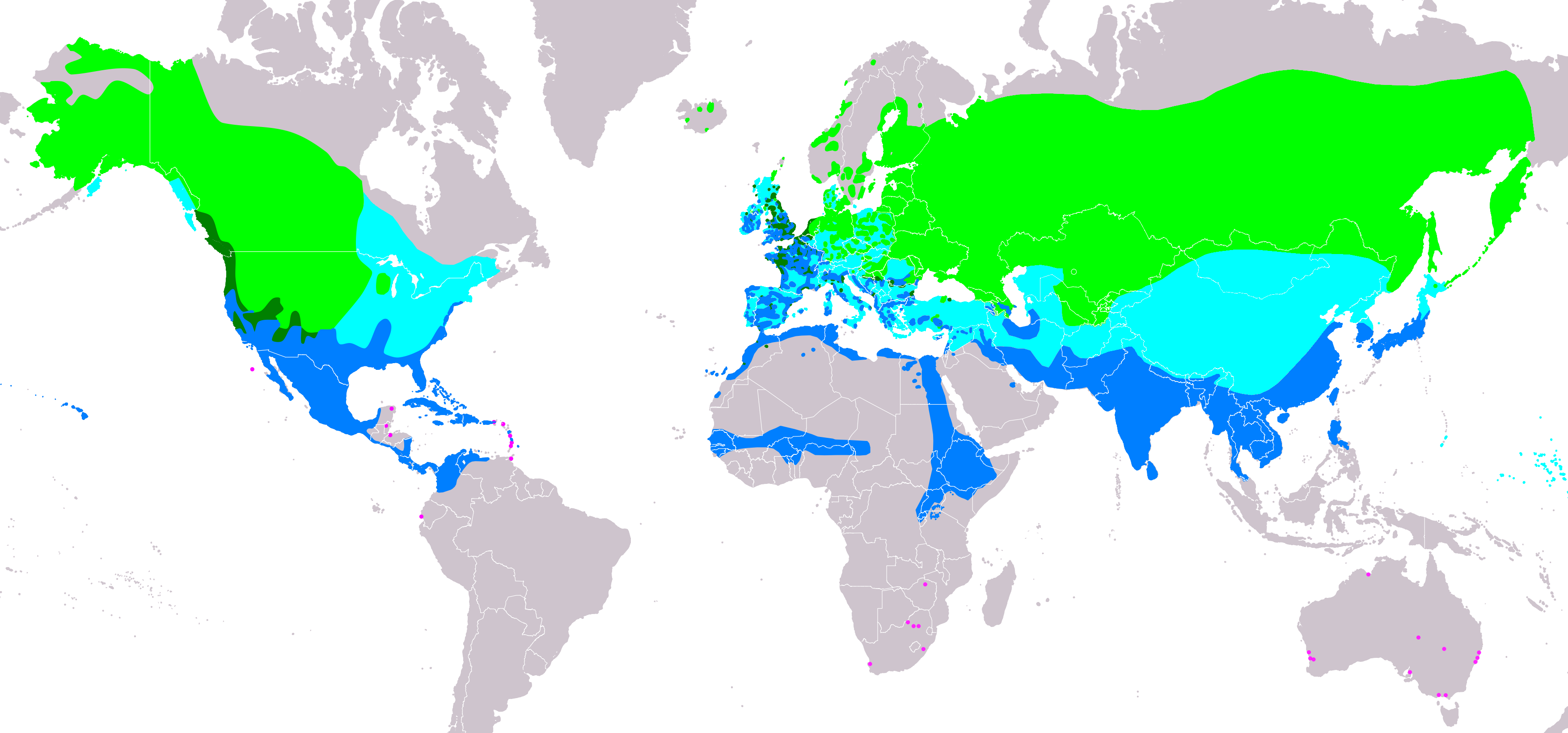
- Range distribution of northern shoveler Breeding Resident Passage Non-breeding Vagrant (seasonality uncertain)

Synonyms
- Anas clypeata Linnaeus, 1758

= Northern shoveler =

Northern shoveler Temporal range: Pleistocene–present

Species of duck

The northern shoveler (/ˈʃʌvələr/; Spatula clypeata), often known simply as the shoveler where other related species do not occur, is a common and widespread duck. It breeds in northern areas of Europe and throughout the Palearctic and across most of North America, and winters in southern Europe, the Indian subcontinent, Southeast Asia, Central America, the Caribbean, and northern South America. It is a rare vagrant to Australia. In North America, it breeds along the southern edge of Hudson Bay and west of this body of water, and as far south as the Great Lakes west to Colorado, Nevada, and Oregon.

The northern shoveler is one of the species to which the Agreement on the Conservation of African-Eurasian Migratory Waterbirds (AEWA) applies. The conservation status of this bird is least concern.

== Taxonomy ==
The northern shoveler was first formally described by Swedish naturalist Carl Linnaeus in 1758 in the 10th edition of his Systema Naturae. He introduced the binomial name Anas clypeata. A molecular phylogentic study comparing mitochondrial DNA sequences published in 2009 found that the genus Anas, as defined at the time, was not monophyletic. The genus was subsequently split into four monophyletic genera with 10 species, including the northern shoveler, moved to the revived genus Spatula. This genus had been originally proposed by the German zoologist Friedrich Boie in 1822. The name Spatula is the Latin for a "spoon" or "spatula". The specific epithet is derived from Latin clypeata, "shield-bearing" (from clypeus, "shield").

No living subspecies are recognised today. Fossil bones of a very similar duck have been found in Early Pleistocene deposits at Dursunlu, Turkey, but how these birds were related to the northern shoveler of today is unclear, whether the differences observed are due to being a related species or paleosubspecies, or attributable to individual variation.

== Habitat and distribution ==
This is a bird of open wetlands, such as wet grasslands or marshes with some emergent vegetation. It breeds in large areas of Eurasia, western North America, and the Great Lakes region of the United States.

This bird winters in western and southern Europe, the Indian subcontinent, the Caribbean, northern South America, the Malay Archipelago, Japan and other areas. Those wintering in the Indian subcontinent make the taxing journey over the Himalayas, often taking a break in wetlands just south of the Himalayas before continuing further south to warmer regions. In North America, it winters south of a line from Washington to Idaho and from New Mexico east to Kentucky, also along the Eastern Seaboard as far north as Massachusetts. In Great Britain, around 1,300-1,450 pairs breed, but it is better known as a winter visitor; it is more common in southern and eastern England, especially around the Ouse Washes, the Humber, and the North Kent Marshes, and in much smaller numbers in Scotland and western parts of England. It breeds across most of Ireland, but the population there is very difficult to assess. Surveys in 2017 and 2018 suggest that it is more common and widespread in Ireland than previously thought. In winter, British and Irish breeding birds may move south, and are joined or replaced by an influx of continental and Icelandic birds from further north.

It is strongly migratory and mostly winters further south than its breeding range. It has occasionally been reported as a vagrant as far south as Australia, New Zealand, and South Africa. It is less gregarious than some dabbling ducks outside the breeding season and tends to form only small flocks. Among North American duck species, the northern shoveler is second only to the mallard and blue-winged teal in overall abundance. Their populations have been healthy since the 1960s, and have increased in recent years to more than 5 million birds (2015), most likely due to favourable breeding, migratory, and wintering habitat conditions.

== Description ==
This species is unmistakable in the Northern Hemisphere due to its large, spatulated bill. The breeding drake has an iridescent, dark green head, though less intensely iridescent than a drake mallard's head, and appears black at distance or in poor light, white breast, and chestnut belly and flanks, and a black or very dark grey bill. In flight, pale blue forewing feathers are revealed, separated from the green speculum by a white border. In early autumn, the male has a white crescent on each side of the face. In nonbreeding eclipse plumage, the drake resembles the female, except retains the pale blue forewing.

The female is a dull, mottled brown like other dabbling ducks, with a plumage similar to that of a female mallard, but easily distinguished by the long,broad bill, which is grey tinged with orange on the cutting edge and lower mandible. The female's forewing is grey.

They are 44–52 cm (17.3–20.5 in) long and have a wingspan of 70–84 cm (27.6–33.1 in) with a weight of 500–800 g (1.1–1.8 lb), rarely only 300 g, or as much as 1,000 g. The legs of both sexes are bright orange-red.

Vagrant northern shovelers in Australia can be very hard to distinguish from the local Australasian shoveler, particularly if in eclipse plumage when the distinctive white breast is absent.

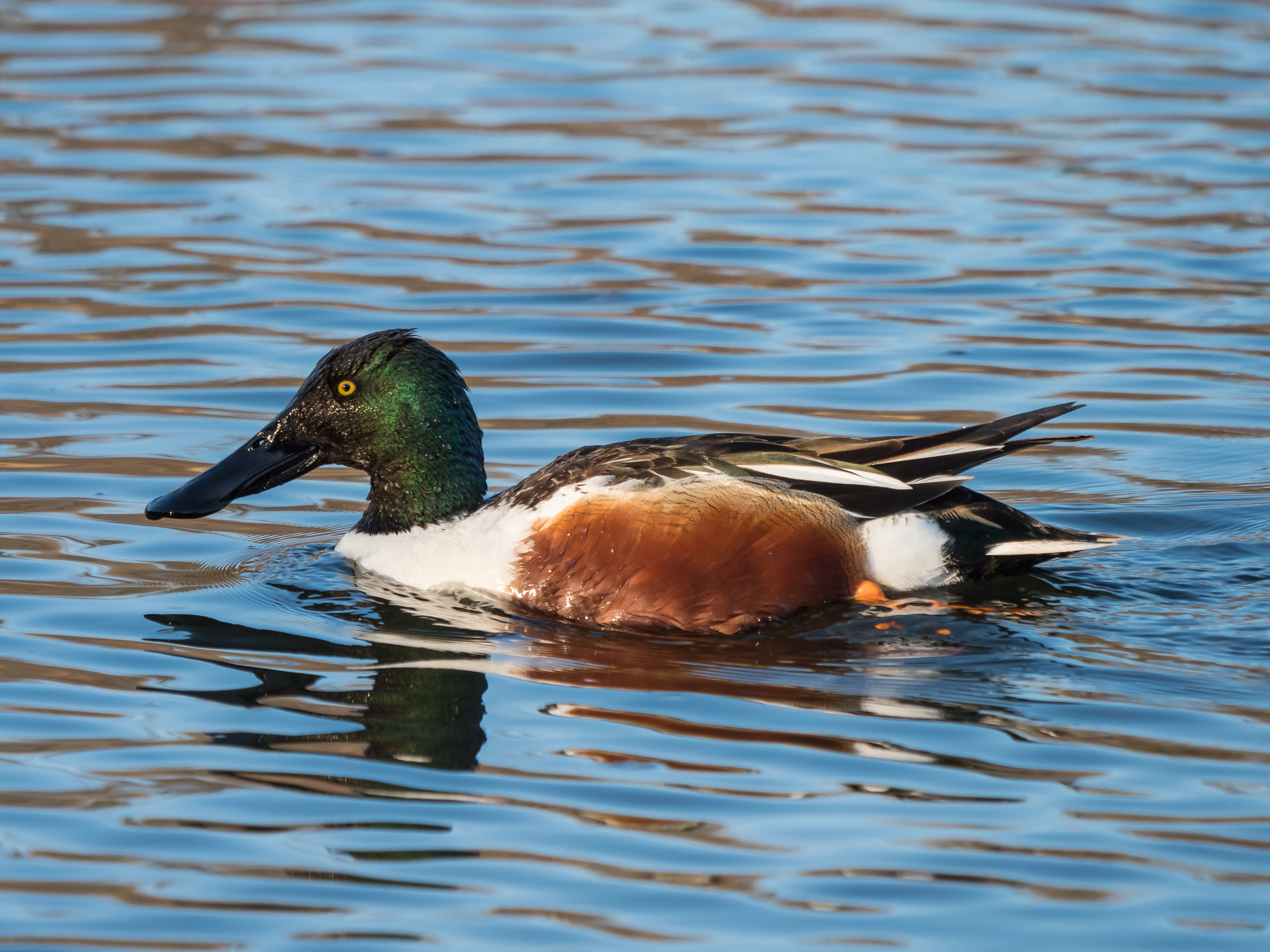
Male, in Switzerland

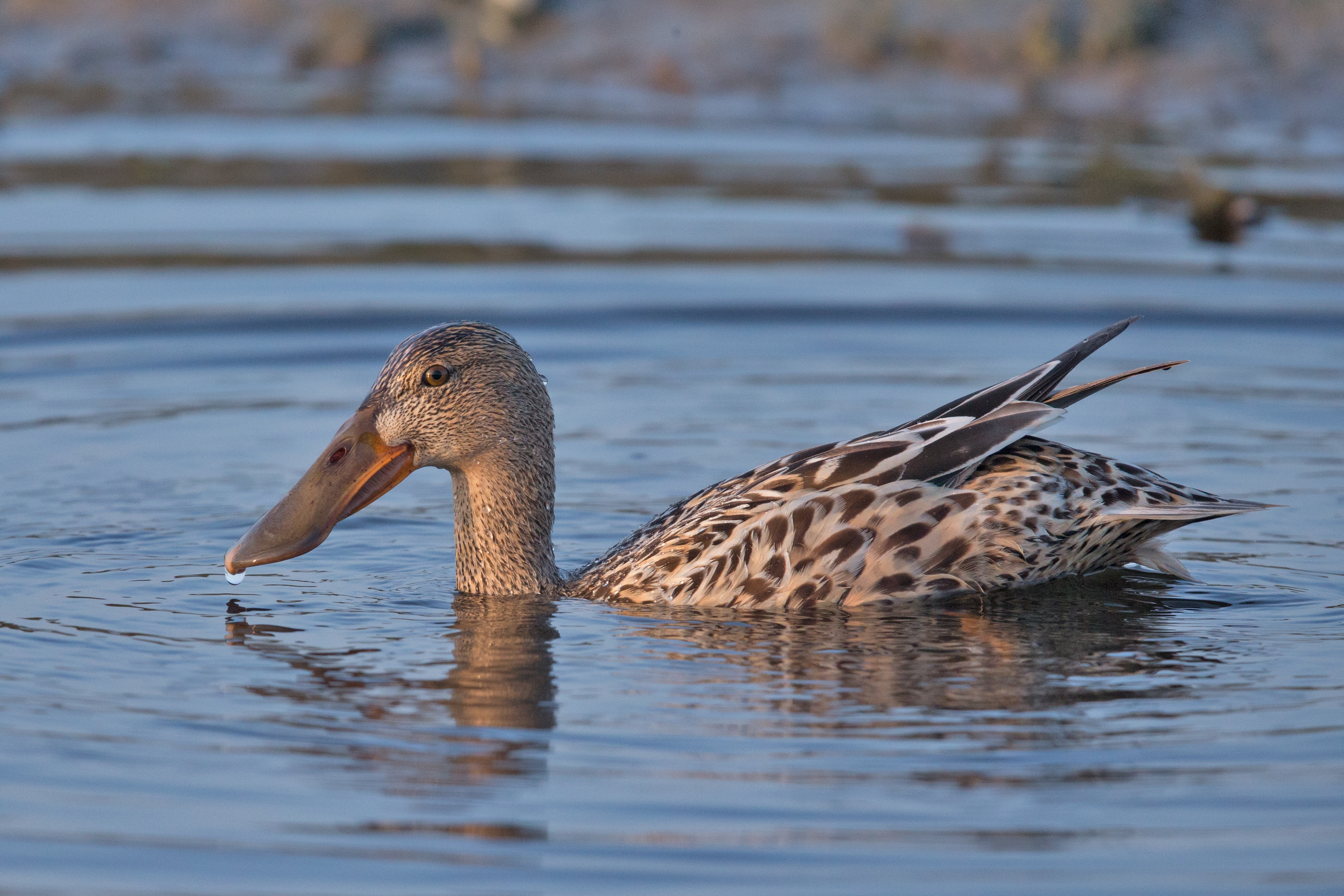
Female, in Germany

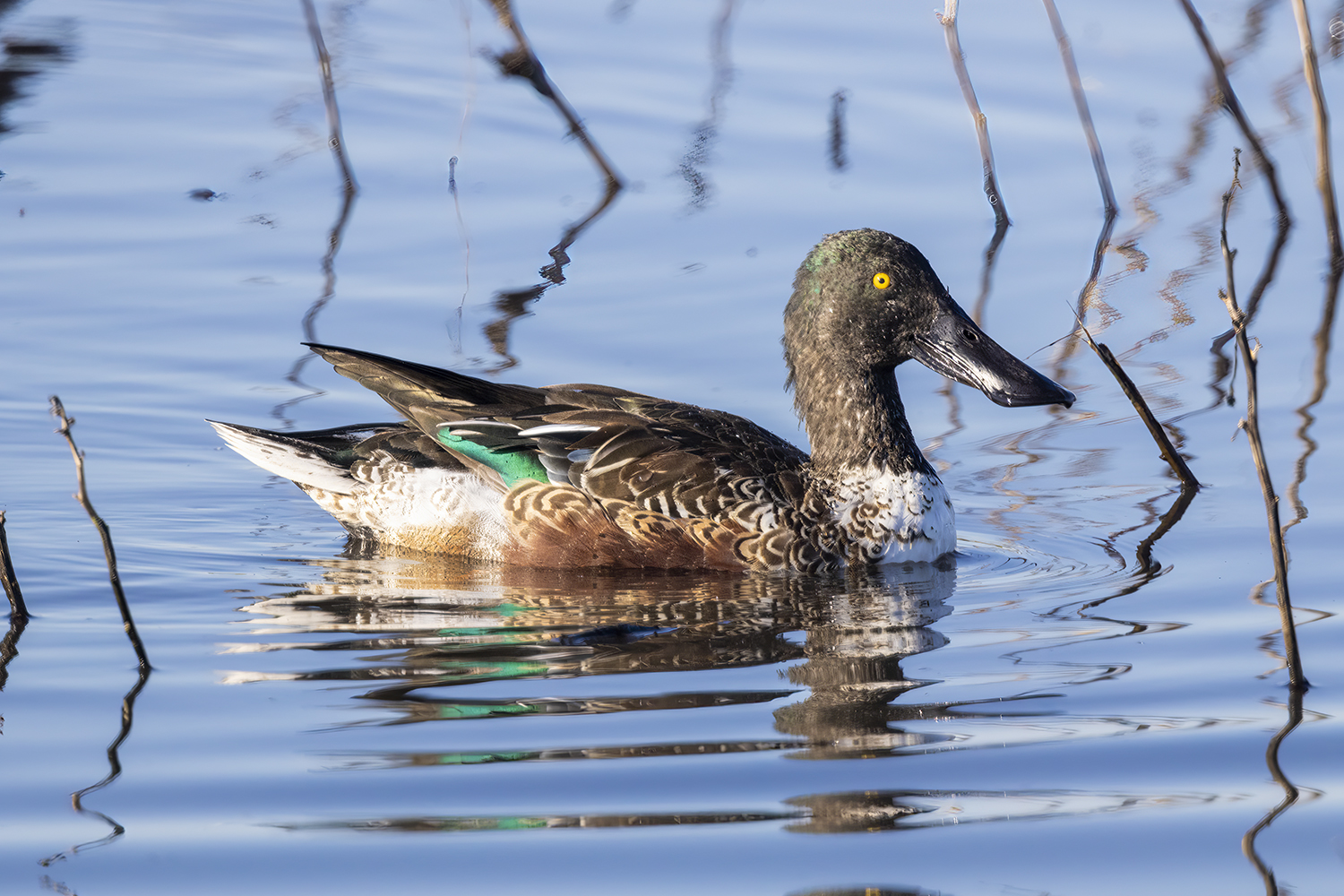
Male in nonbreeding plumage

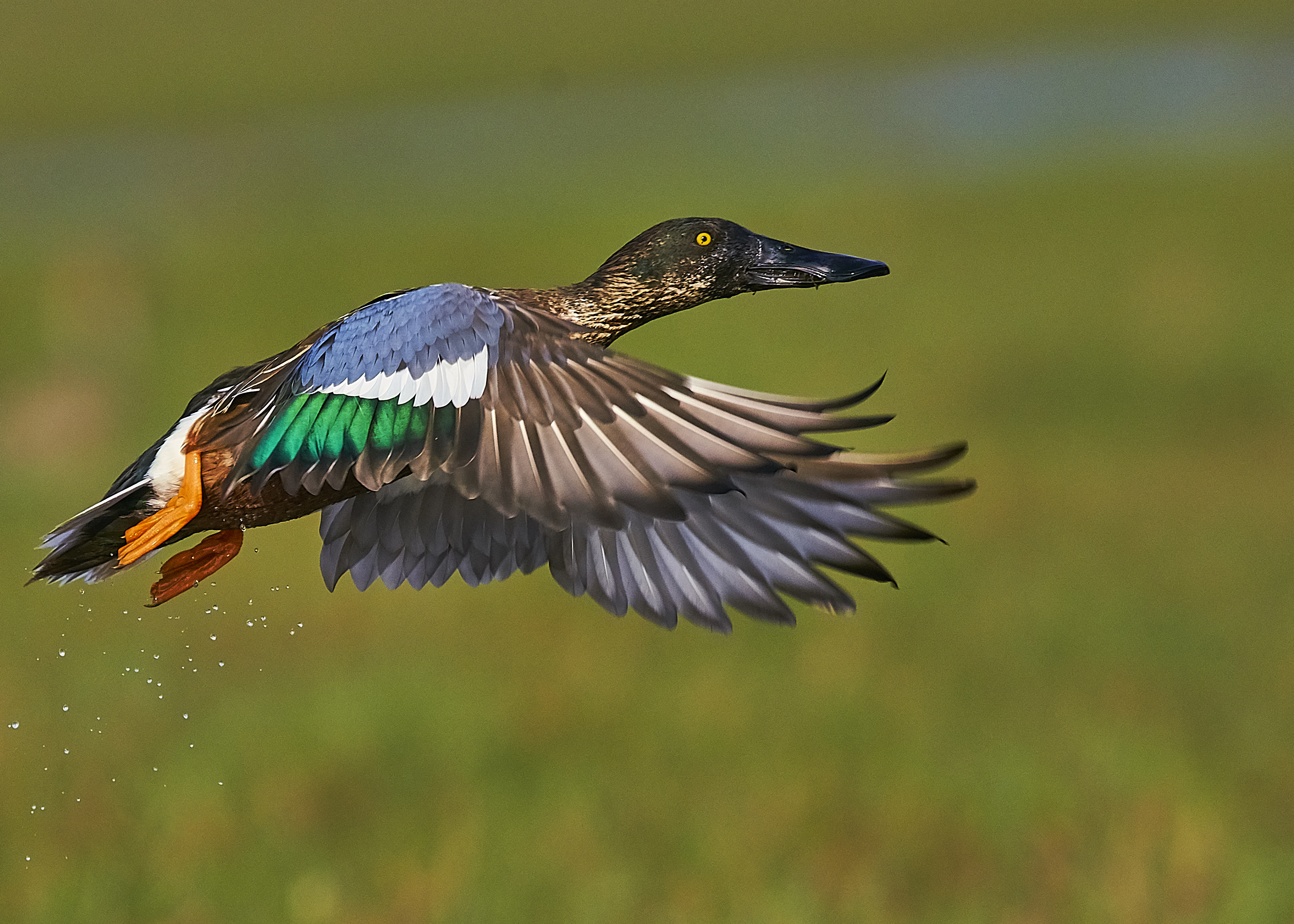
Male, still partly in eclipse plumage, in flight, showing the blue forewing and green speculum; Chilika Lake, Odisha, India

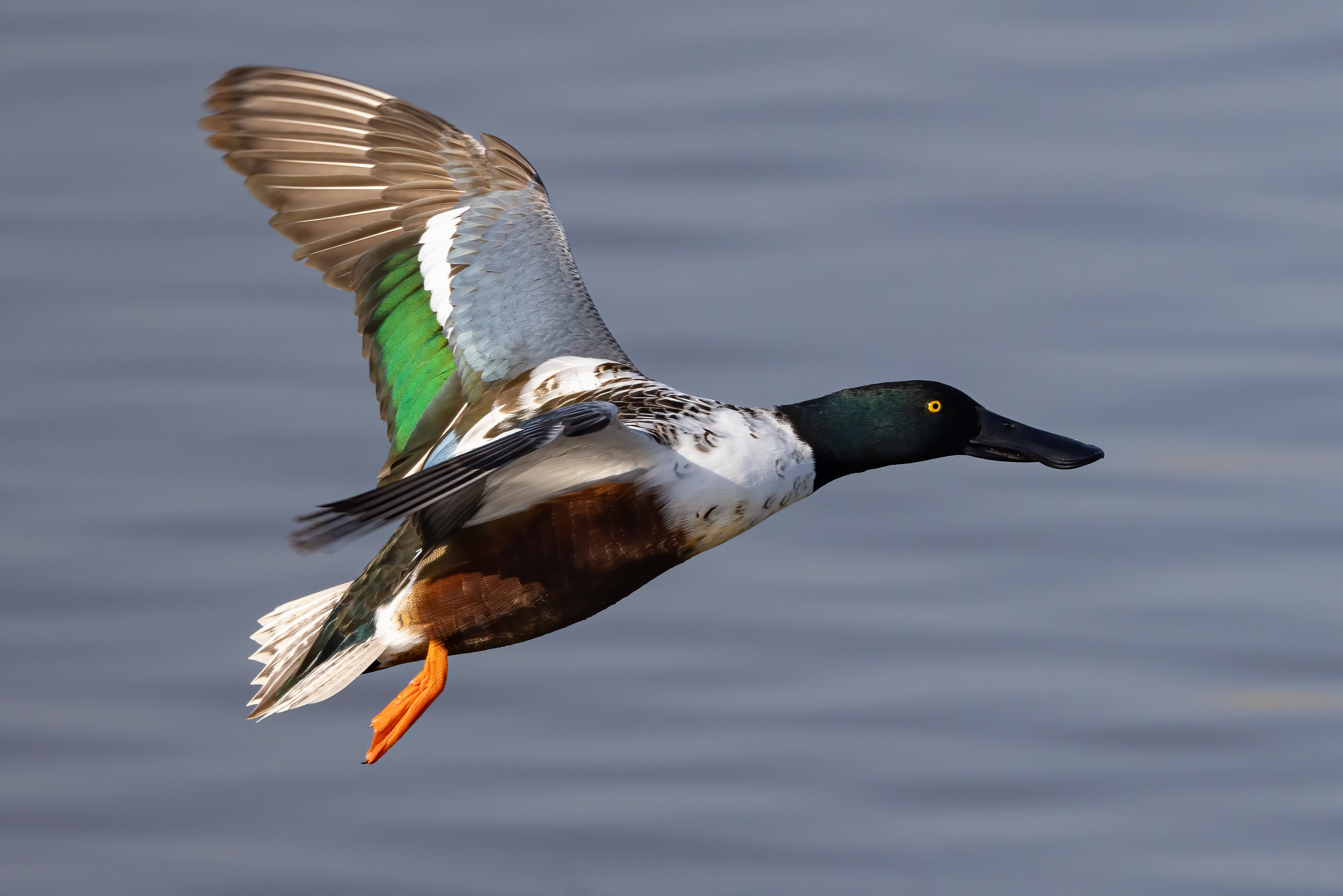
Male in California

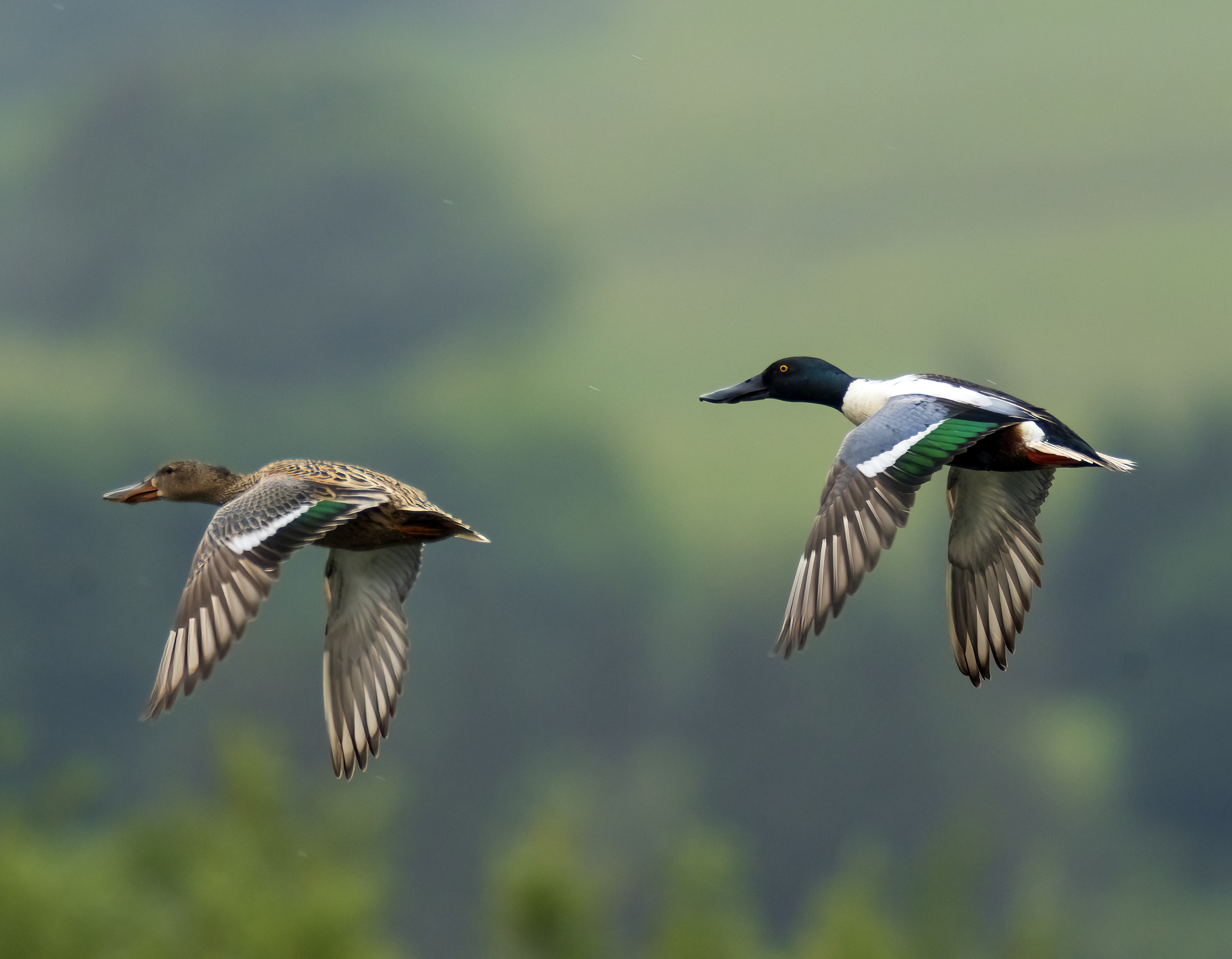
Pair in flight, showing the female's grey forewing and dull speculum compared to the male's pale blue forewing and bright speculum, in Scotland

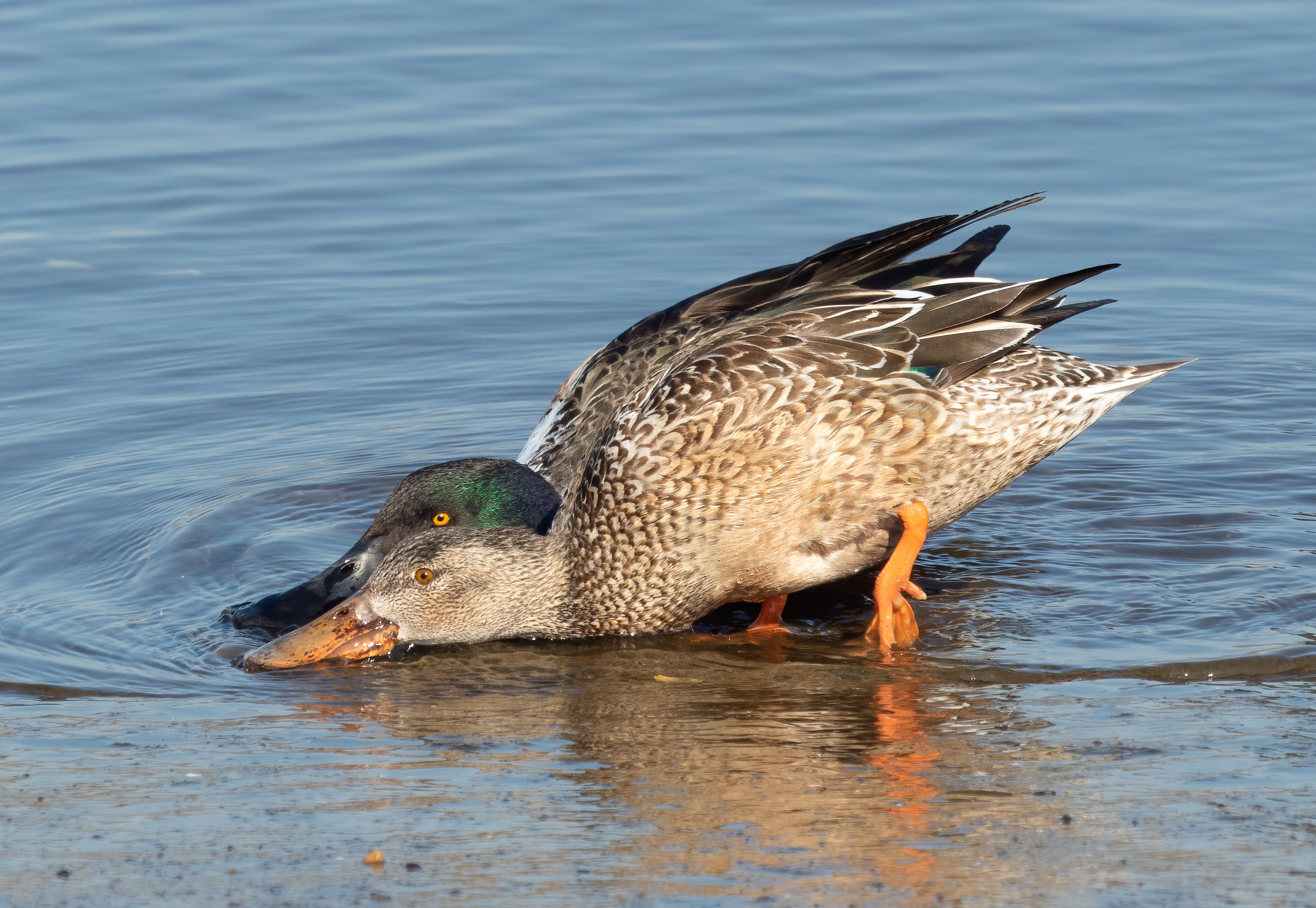
A pair foraging together in New York City

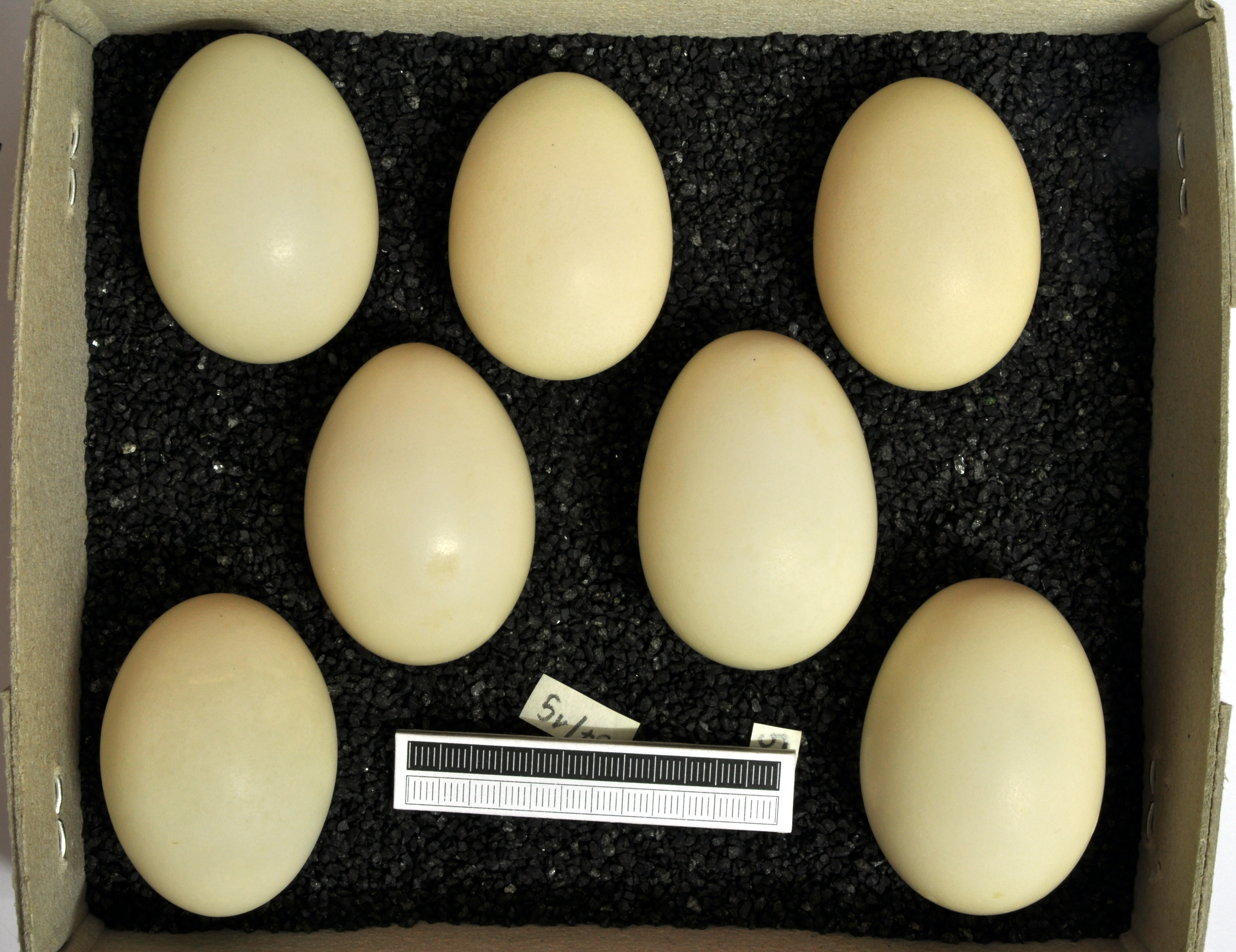
Eggs, in the Museum Wiesbaden collection

== Behaviour ==
Groups of northern shovelers swim rapidly in circles to collect food from the surface by creating a funnel effect.

Northern shovelers feed by dabbling for plant food, often by swinging their bills from side to side and using the bill to strain food from the water. They use their highly specialised bills (from which their name is derived) to forage for aquatic invertebrates. Their wide, flat bill is equipped with well-developed lamellae – small, comb-like structures on the edge of the bill that act like sieves, allowing the birds to skim crustaceans and plankton from the surface of the water. This adaptation, which is more specialised in shovelers, gives them an advantage over other dabbling ducks, with which they do not have to compete for food resources for most of the year. As a result, mud-bottomed marshes rich in invertebrates are their habitat of choice.

The shoveler prefers to nest in grassy areas away from open water. The nest is a shallow depression in the ground, lined with vegetation and down. Hens typically lay about nine eggs. The eggs measure 4.6–5.7 cm (1.8–2.2 in) in length and 3.3–3.9 cm (1.3–1.5 in) in width. Drakes are very territorial during the breeding season and defend their territory and mates from competing males. Drakes also engage in elaborate courtship displays, both on the water and in the air; not uncommonly, a dozen or more males maypursue a single hen. Despite their stocky appearance, shovelers are nimble fliers.

This is a fairly quiet species. The male has a clunking call, whereas the female has a mallard-like quack.
