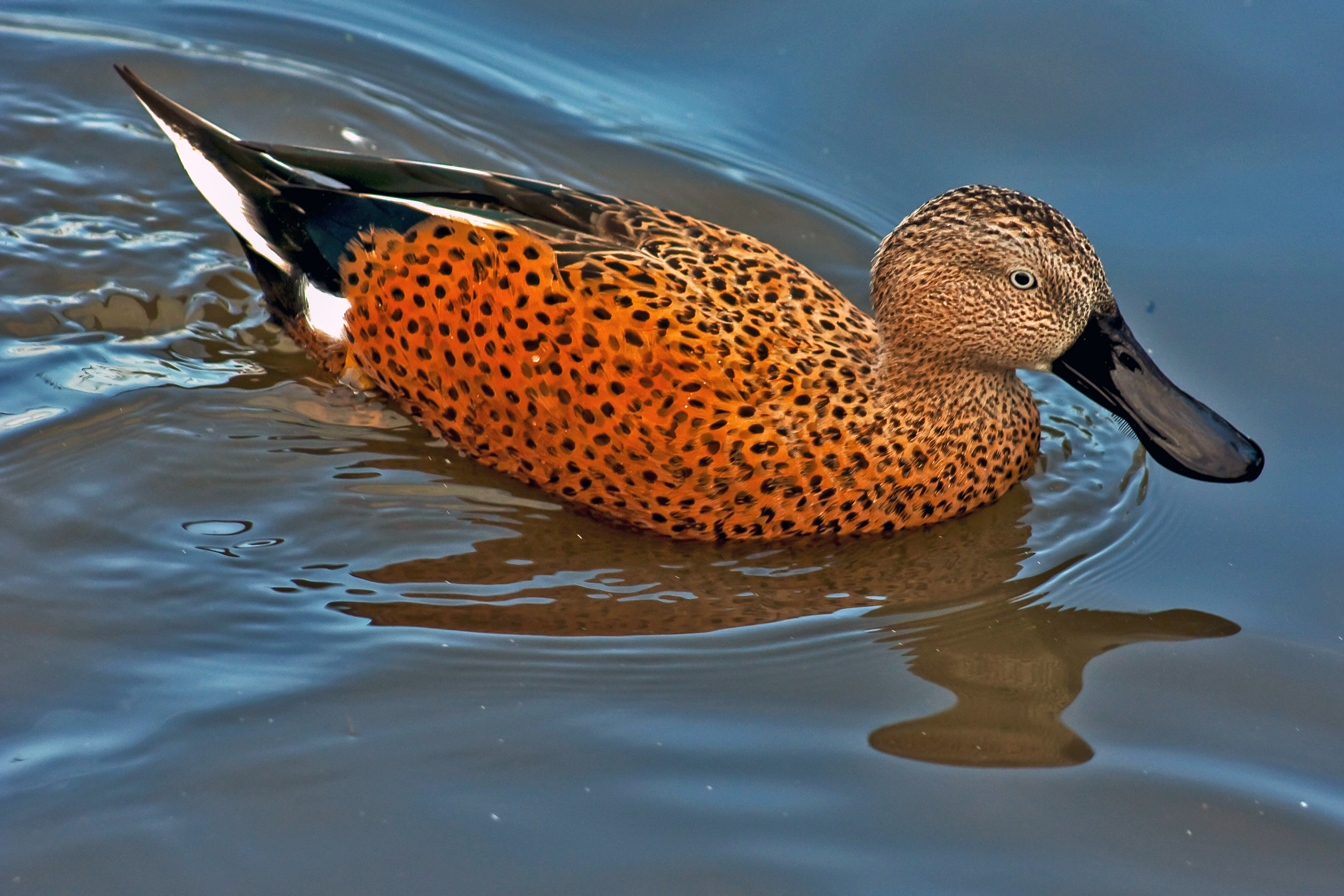
- adult male at WWT Slimbridge, England
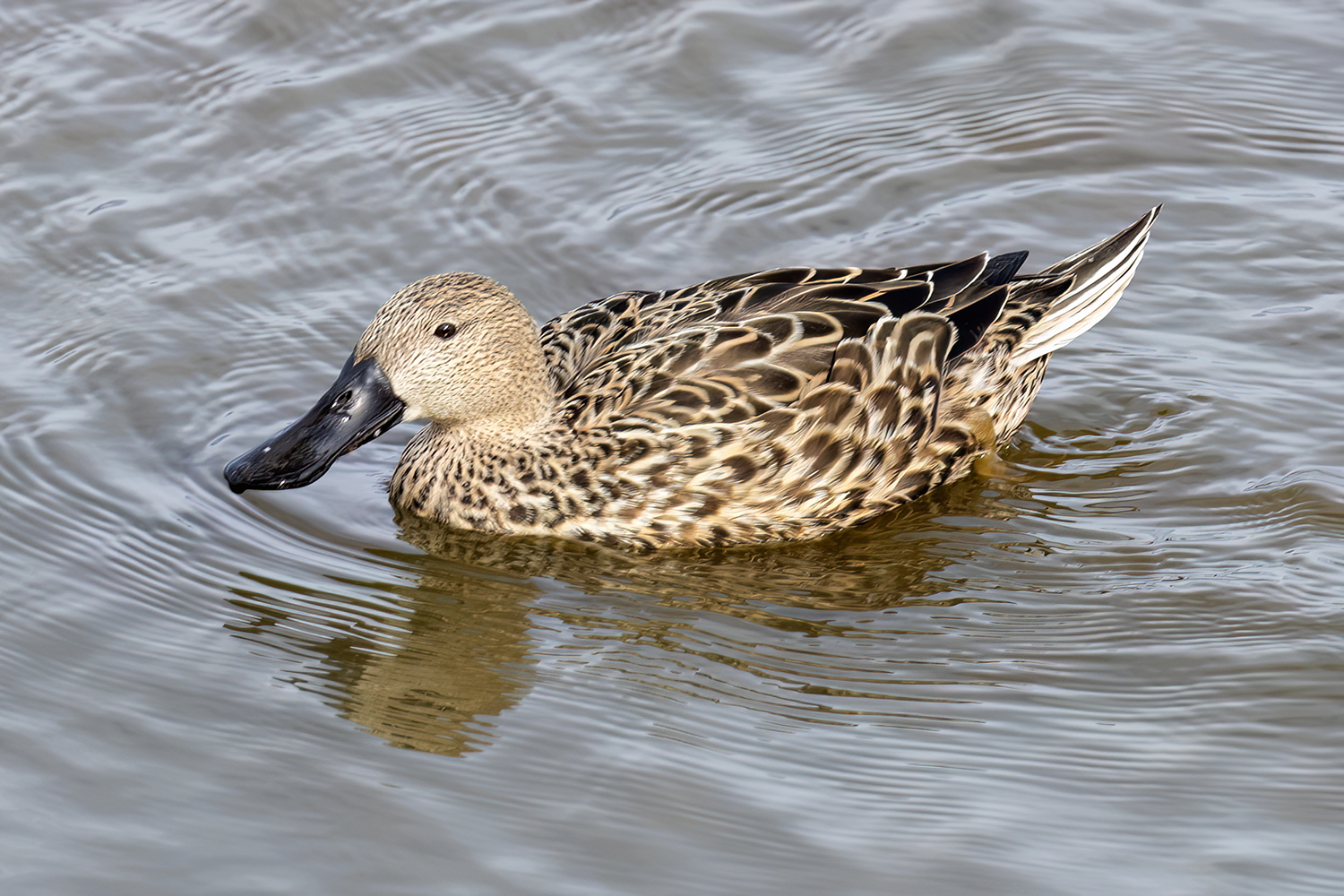
- Adult female in Punta Arenas, Chile

Conservation status
- Least Concern (IUCN 3.1)

Scientific classification
- Kingdom: Animalia
- Phylum: Chordata
- Class: Aves
- Order: Anseriformes
- Family: Anatidae
- Genus: Spatula
- Species: S. platalea

Binomial name
- Spatula platalea (Vieillot, 1816)

Synonyms
- Anas platalea Vieillot 1816

= Red shoveler =

Species of bird

The red shoveler (Spatula platalea) is a species of dabbling duck native to southern South America.

== Description ==
The species has a spatula-shaped bill, a green speculum, and light blue upper wing converts. Male shovelers vary in color from red to paler shades of red (and pink), while the females tend to have large, dark bills. Adults reach a size of about 45–56 centimetres (18–22 in), weigh about 523–608 grams (1.153–1.340 lb), and have a wingspan of about 66–73 centimetres (26–29 in).

== Distribution and habitat ==
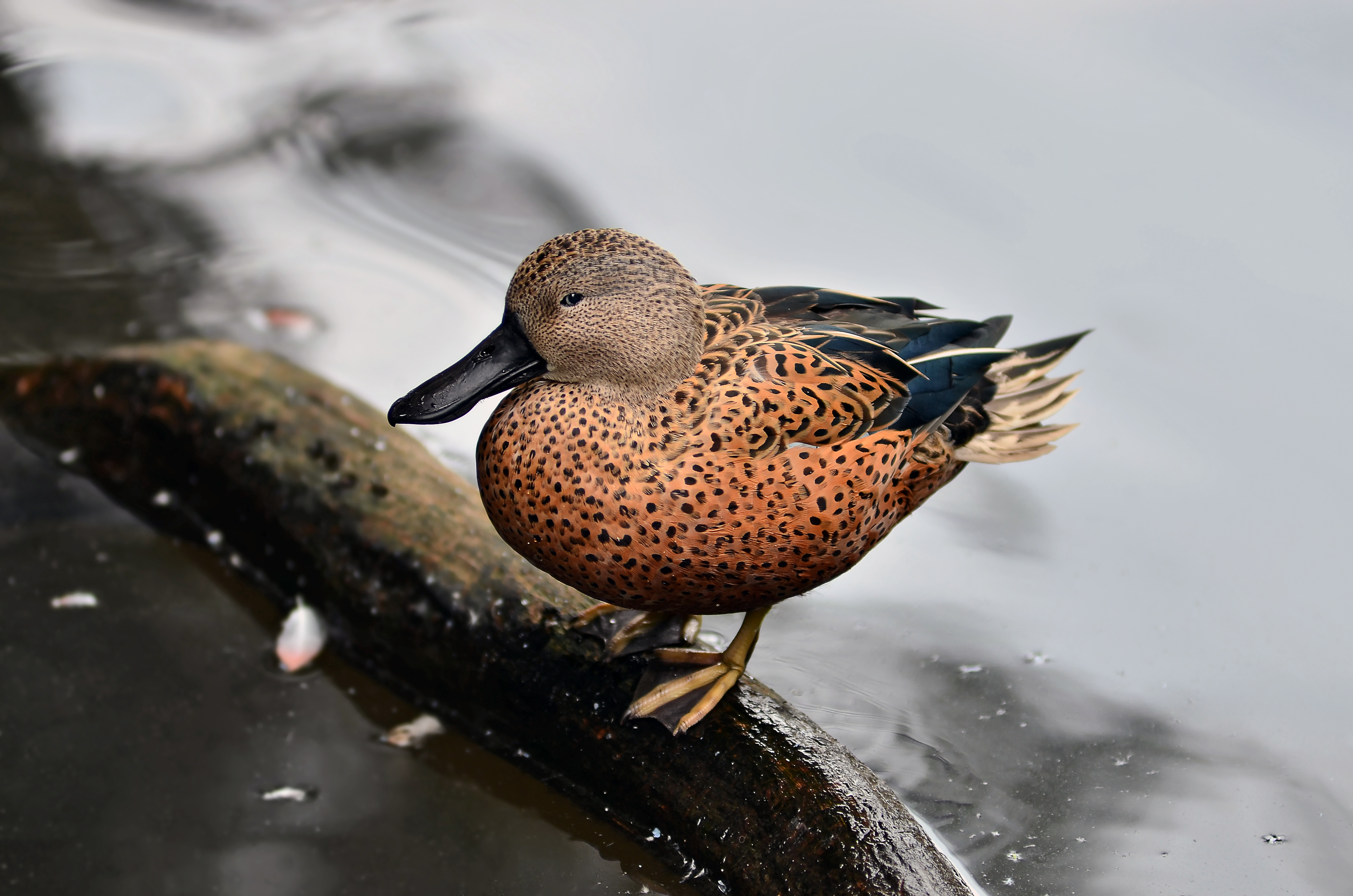
Resting at the Weltvogelpark Walsrode

The red shoveler breeds in the southern half of South America. It ranges from Tierra del Fuego northwards to Chile and most parts of Argentina, as well as to the Falkland Islands; there are small, isolated breeding populations in the southern regions of Peru, Bolivia, and Paraguay. They can also be found in the extreme southern regions of Brazil and Uruguay, in isolated coastal populations and also further inland. It inhabits shallow lakes and pools with dense reed beds, intertidal mangrove swamps and marshes. They can also be found in brackish waters, such as coastal lagoons, deltas and estuaries.

== Ecology ==
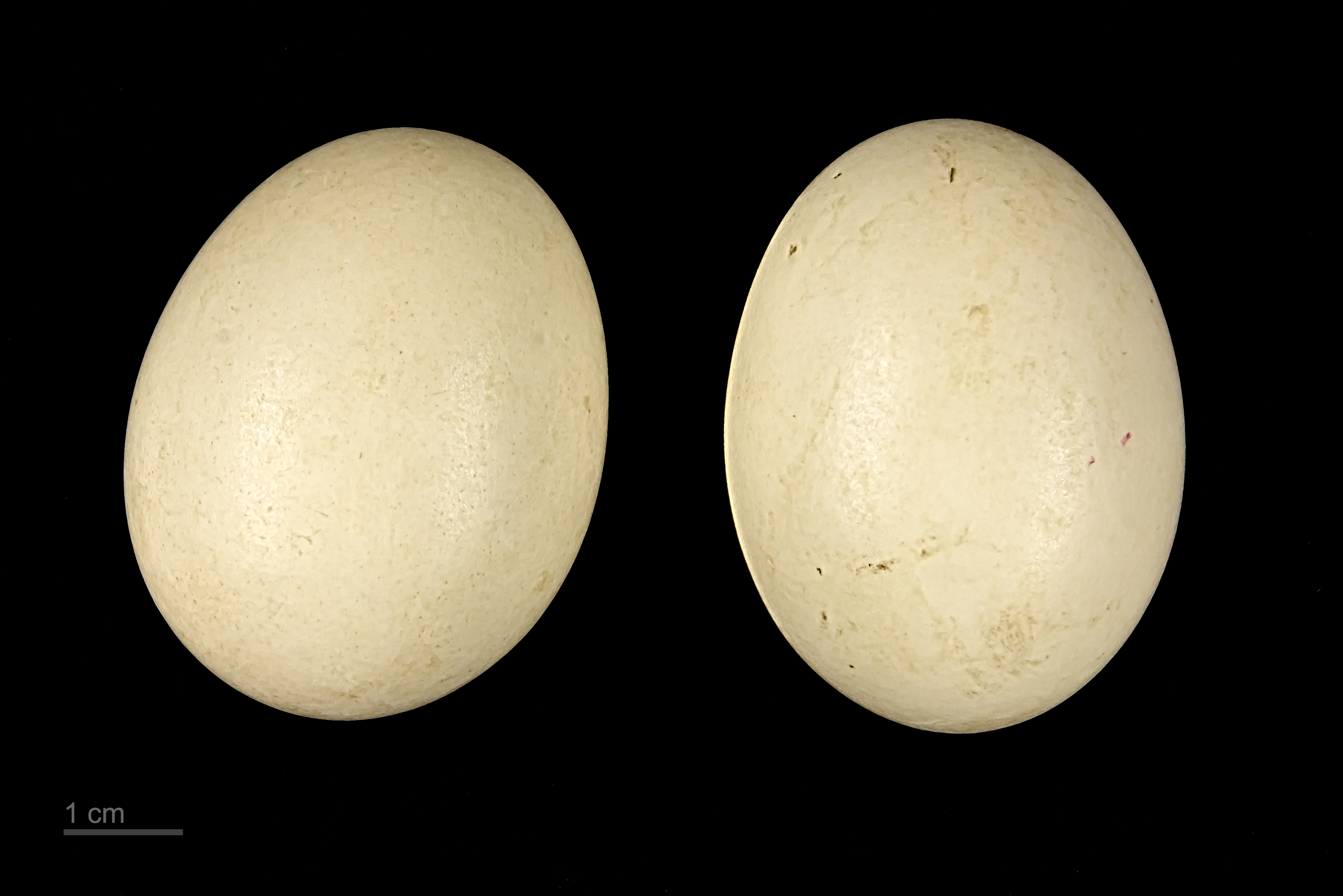
Anas platalea - MHNT

Red shovelers have a diet that includes herbs, grasses, pond weeds, widgeon grass, algae, and eelgrass. They also feed on small invertebrates. The bill is equipped with a lamellate filtering mechanism that allows the extraction of small items of food from the water. Pairs form in the wintering grounds, after often noisy courtship. Once a clutch of 7–8 eggs is laid, incubation lasts about 25–26 days, followed by 40–45 days of fledging. Red shovelers are partially migratory, with the southernmost birds migrating north during the winter season.

== Conservation ==
The red shoveler is a relatively common and widespread species, and is not currently considered at risk. However, it may suffer to an extent from the degradation of its wetland habitats. The species is classified as Least Concern on the IUCN Red List due to its extremely large range and apparently overall stable population. Unfortunately, the wetland habitats used for nesting by this species are under threat by problems such as eutrophication due to agriculture runoff, which causes a loss in aquatic plants, making it difficult for the ducks to find food reliably much less build nests out of said aquatic/herbaceous plants along with grazing cattle trampling down nests and vegetation needed to hide the nests to begin with. This means that despite their species being considered under the category of Least Concern, actual steps need to be taken towards the conservation of this species by both regular farmers and the wetland areas dedicated to conservation where they are supposedly protected from things like tourism, fishing, and hunting, as their true numbers in the wild are unknown because this species is so spread out.
