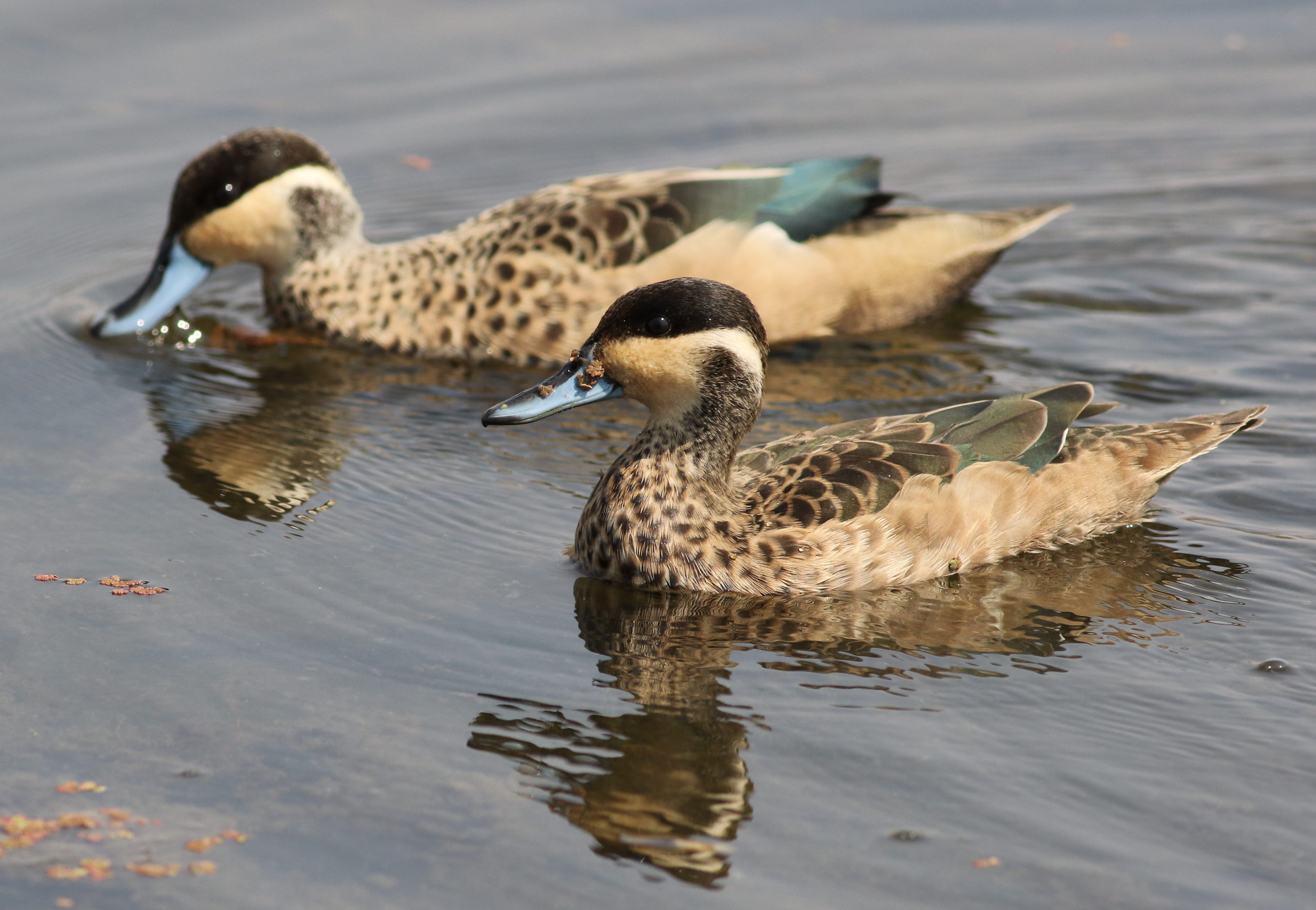
- Pair at Marievale Bird Sanctuary, Gauteng, South Africa

Conservation status
- Least Concern (IUCN 3.1)

Scientific classification
- Kingdom: Animalia
- Phylum: Chordata
- Class: Aves
- Order: Anseriformes
- Family: Anatidae
- Genus: Spatula
- Species: S. hottentota

Binomial name
- Spatula hottentota (Eyton, 1838)

Synonyms
- Anas punctata Burchell, 1822 (senior synonym); Querquedula hottentota Eyton, 1838; Punanetta hottentota Eyton, 1838; Anas hottentota (Eyton, 1838)

= Blue-billed teal =

Species of bird

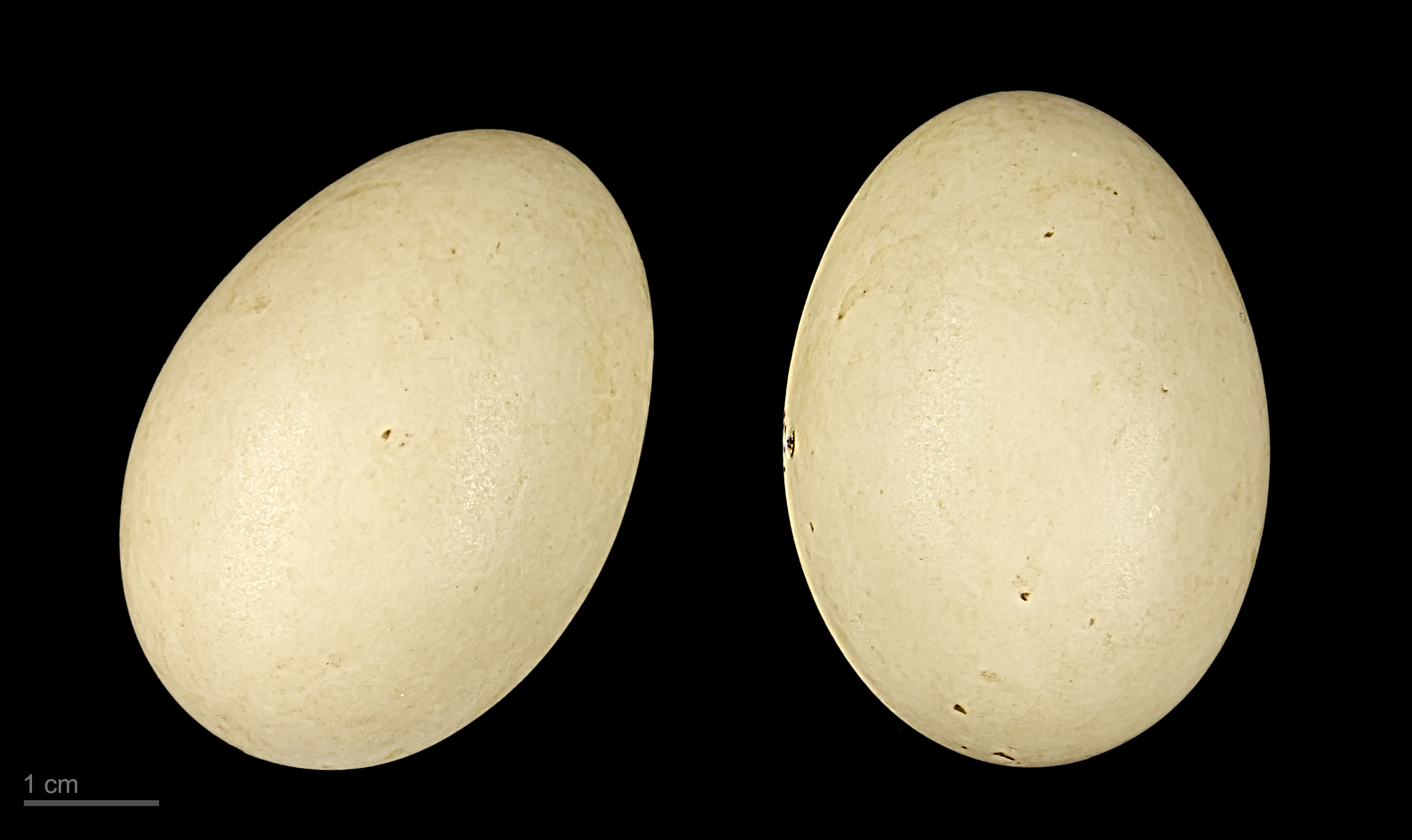
Eggs at the Muséum de Toulouse

The blue-billed teal (Spatula hottentota), also sometimes called spotted teal and formerly Hottentot teal, is a species of dabbling duck of the genus Spatula. It is resident in eastern, southern, and western Africa, from Sudan and Ethiopia west to Niger and Nigeria, and south to South Africa and Namibia, and also in Madagascar. It is generally sedentary, but shows nomadic behaviour in response to water requirements, moving away if drought causes wetlands to dry out.

The blue-billed teal breeds year round, depending on rainfall, and stays in small groups or pairs. They build nests above water in tree stumps and use vegetation. Ducklings leave the nest soon after hatching, and the mother's parenting is limited to providing protection from predators and leading young to feeding areas. This species is omnivorous and prefers smaller shallow bodies of water.

The blue-billed teal is one of the species to which the Agreement on the Conservation of African-Eurasian Migratory Waterbirds (AEWA) applies. The status of the blue-billed teal on the IUCN Red List is Least Concern.

Several texts still refer to this species as the Hottentot teal, however, as the word "Hottentot" is an offensive term for the Khoisan people, there has been a movement to change the vernacular name.

== Taxonomy ==
Spatula hottentota was previously placed in the genus Anas, and in the past called Anas punctata. This name was suppressed owing to confusion over type specimens. It has been also referred as Anas hottentota. and Querquedula hottentota.

Blue-billed teal is currently considered monotypic, with no subspecies being recognised. Birds in Madagascar were formerly sometimes distinguished as a separate subspecies, S. h. delacouri, but this is no longer considered distinct.

== Description ==
=== Identification ===
Adult males have dark brown crown contrasting with paler face, throat, breast and side except for a blackish thumb-shaped patch on the ear region. The back of the neck is spotted with black and this spotting extends down through the neck and become intensively spotted on the breast, the spots appear to be larger and less obvious on the light brown flanks and abdomen, and the posterior underparts and under tail coverts becoming vermiculated with black. The scapulars and tail are dark brown to black, the upper wing surface is blackish as well, with the coverts giving a greenish gloss. An iridescent green speculum exists on the secondaries, bounded posteriorly by narrow black and terminal white bars. The iris is brown, the legs and feet are bluish grey, and the bill is light bluish grey with a blackish culmen and nail.

Females have browner crowns, they have less contrasting facial markings and more rounded scapulars, the under tail coverts are not vermiculated, and the wing is less glossy and colourful than that of the adult male.

Juveniles resemble adult females but are duller throughout the body and less distinctively marked with spots. Ducklings have greyish brown underparts and yellowish grey below, the cheeks is paler with pinky puff wash and grey-brown ear patch.

=== Measurements and weights ===
The blue-billed teal is one of the smallest ducks in its range in Africa.

- Length: 330–350 mm (13–14 in)
- Wingspan: 580–690 mm (23–27 in)
- Weight: 53–288 g (1.9–10.2 oz)
- Wing: 147–157 mm (5.8–6.2 in)
- Tail: 55–66 mm (2.2–2.6 in)
- Bill: 32–42 mm (1.3–1.7 in)
- Eggs: 43×33 mm in average, creamy, 25 g

== Distribution and habitat ==
The range of the blue-billed teal extends in Africa from Angola, Zambia, eastern Congo, Malawi, northern Mozambique, Tanzania, Kenya, Uganda, southern Ethiopia, Sudan and Madagascar. They are mainly found in tropical eastern Africa: Ethiopia to Cape Province, westward to northern Botswana and Namibia, and Madagascar.

The blue-billed teal prefers habitats with abundant plants with floating leaves and fringe vegetation, including shallow fresh-water swamps, marshes, streams, shallow small lakes and ponds with fringed edges of reeds or papyrus. They are observed to spend the twilight and night hours dabbling in very shallow waters and move to deeper and safer parts of the marsh during daytime.

== Behaviour ==
The blue-billed teal is sedentary in West Africa and Madagascar but partly migratory elsewhere, following regular but unpredictable short-distance migration routes, up to 700 km (430 mi), in southern and eastern Africa in response to changing water levels.

=== Feeding and diet ===
The blue-billed teal prefers feeding at muddy edges, it will also feed on lands and flooded fields like rice paddies, and in waterside that is disturbed heavily by livestock. It feeds in well-vegetated areas by dabbling, swimming or on foot. No diving during foraging is recorded. It is omnivorous, although its diet consists mainly of grass seeds, especially of the grass Sacciolepis, however it may also consume aquatic invertebrates almost exclusively such as crustaceans like ostracods, molluscs, water insects such as beetles and their larvae, if these are super abundant.

=== Moult ===
Moult is poorly understood in the blue-billed teal; there is no identified eclipse plumage in males, but breeding males are much brighter than females and the breast spots are more distinct.

=== Vocal behaviour ===
Both sexes produce series of clicking notes, given as harsh ke-ke-ke when they are disturbed, during flying or within flock. Males produce a highly distinctive wooden rattling call that sounds like a mechanical rattle, while the female has a typical quack and a decrescendo call of only a few notes.

=== Social behaviour and reproduction ===
The breeding behaviour of the blue-billed teal is relatively undemonstrative. Based on current research, the bond of blue-billed teal does not extend beyond the female's incubation period, suggesting the bond is presumably reestablished annually. Although majority of breeding is observed in summer, this species also breed in winter, and thus courtship behaviour can be seen throughout the whole year. The most common display in this species is the combination of female inciting and male turning the back of the head. Female blue-billed teal incites males by doing lateral movements silently or nearly silently, and males usually respond by swimming ahead and turning the back of the head. However, the males may respond by drinking, they raise their neck vertically and produce a soft mechanical series of call notes (burping) and they sometimes combine these two displays in a burp-drinking order. Moreover, during social display, the duck frequently perform a wing-flapping and both-wing-stretch sequence of behaviour that seems to be a significant part of the display. Pre-copulatory behaviour consists of mutual head pumping, and post-copulatory display by the male may vary from no perceptible activity to a swimming shake, wing flapping, or burping. The female most usually only bathes after copulation. The cluster size for this species ranges from 6 to 8 eggs with 7 being the most frequently encountered number. However, based on Clark's observation on the Witwatersrand, the ducklings in families ranges from 1 to 7 with 3 predominating. Incubation period ranges from 25 to 27 days for naturally incubated clutches. The male may remain nearby as the female incubates, but there is no indication of further male participation in brood rearing. So far as is known, the species is not multiple-brooded, although nest failure may lead to re-nesting.

== Status and conservation ==
It is a least concern species on the IUCN Red List. However, habitat degradation is a threat to this species. Protecting wetland and waterside vegetation and controlling hunting will help maintain the population.
