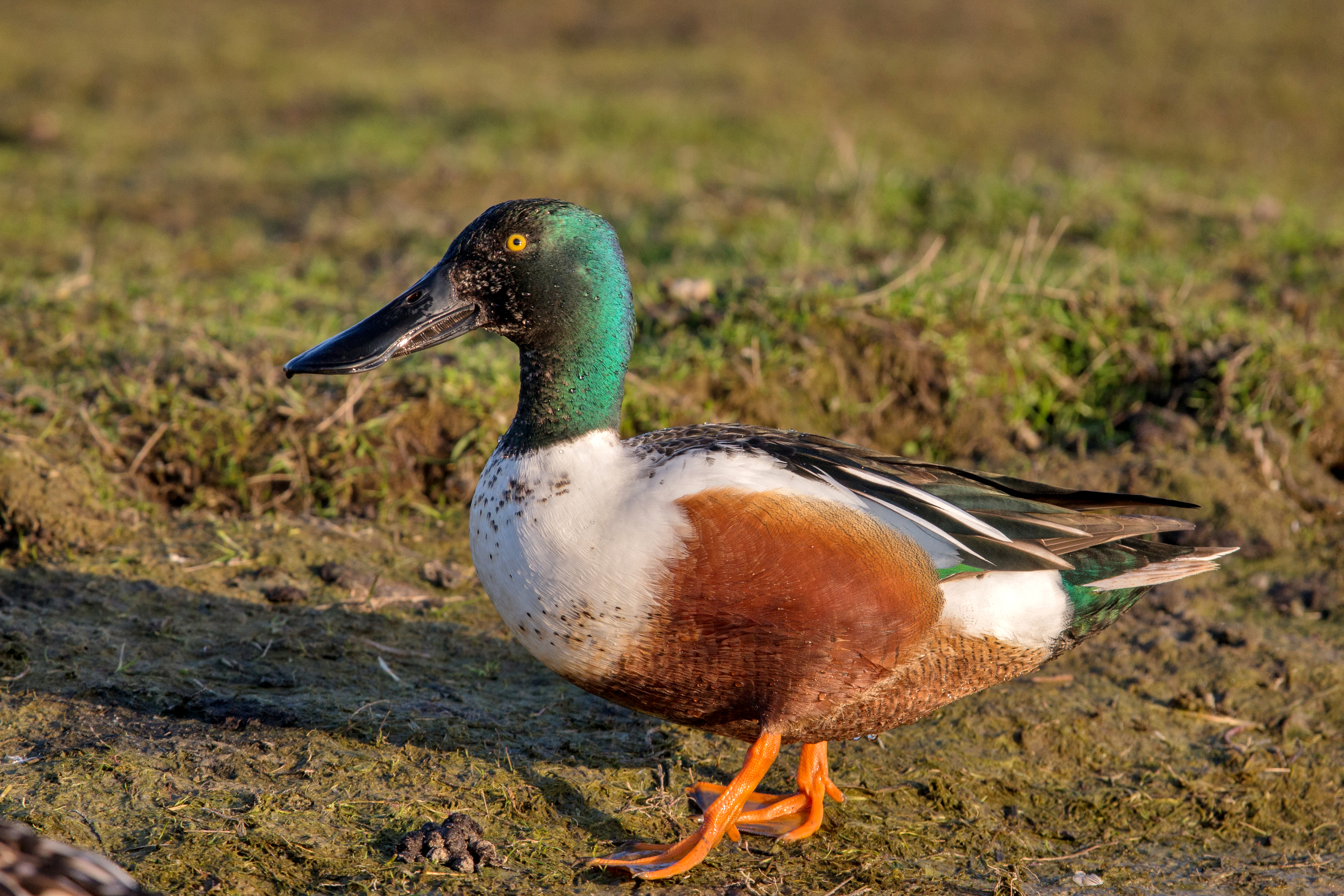
- Male northern shoveler

Scientific classification
- Kingdom: Animalia
- Phylum: Chordata
- Class: Aves
- Order: Anseriformes
- Family: Anatidae
- Tribe: Anatini
- Genus: Spatula; Boie, F, 1822

Type species
- Anas clypeata (now Spatula clypeata) Linnaeus, 1758

Synonyms
- List: Anas (Pterocyanea) Bonaparte 1841; Querquedula Stephens 1824; Querquedula Oken 1817 nomen nudum; Rhynchaspis Stephens 1824; Rhynchoplatus Berthold 1827; Cyanopterus Bonaparte1838 non Haliday 1835; Clypeata Lesson 1828; Anas (Micronetta) Roberts 1922; Adelonetta Heine & Reichenow 1890; Punanetta Bonaparte 1856; Fugaluna Trennins 1858

= Spatula (bird) =

Genus of birds

Spatula is a genus of ducks in the family Anatidae that includes the shovelers, garganey, and several species of teals.

== Taxonomy ==
The species now placed in this genus were formerly placed in the genus Anas. Molecular phylogenetic studies comparing mitochondrial DNA sequences published in 1999 and 2009 found that the genus Anas, as then defined, was not monophyletic. Based on this published phylogeny, the genus Anas was split into four monophyletic genera, with ten species moved into the resurrected genus Spatula.

The genus Spatula had originally been proposed by the German zoologist Friedrich Boie in 1822. The type species is the northern shoveler. The name Spatula is the Latin word for "spoon", from which the English word "spatula" also originates.

=== Extant species ===
The genus contains ten species. The four larger species with large bills are known as shovelers, while the smaller species are mostly called teals.

Genus Spatula – Boie, F, 1822 – ten species
Common name	Scientific name and subspecies	Range	Size and ecology	IUCN status and estimated population
Garganey Male Female	Spatula querquedula (Linnaeus, 1758)	Europe and Asia, also in Africa in winter	Size: 37–41 cm Habitat: Diet:	LC
Blue-billed teal	Spatula hottentota (Eyton, 1838)	eastern and southern Africa, from Sudan and Ethiopia west to Niger and Nigeria and south to South Africa and Namibia	Size: 30–36 cm Habitat: Diet:	LC
Puna teal	Spatula puna (Tschudi, 1844)	the Andes of Peru, western Bolivia, northern Chile and extreme northwestern Argentina	Size: 48–51 cm Habitat: Diet:	LC
Silver teal	Spatula versicolor (Vieillot, 1816) Two subspecies: S. v. versicolor (Vieillot, 1816); S. v. fretensis (King, 1831))	southern Bolivia, southern Brazil, Paraguay, Argentina, Chile, Uruguay, South Georgia, the South Sandwich Islands and the Falkland Islands	Size: 38–43 cm Habitat: Diet:	LC
Red shoveler Male Female	Spatula platalea (Vieillot, 1816)	Tierra del Fuego northwards to Chile and most parts of Argentina, as well as the Falkland Islands and small isolated breeding populations in southern Peru	Size: 45–56 cm Habitat: Diet:	LC
Cinnamon teal Male Female	Spatula cyanoptera (Vieillot, 1816) Four subspecies: Spatula cyanoptera septentrionalium (Oberholser, 1906); Spatula cyanoptera tropica (Snyder & Lumsden, 1951); Spatula cyanoptera borreroi (Snyder & Lumsden, 1951); Spatula cyanoptera orinoma (Snyder & Lumsden, 1951); Spatula cyanoptera cyanoptera (Vieillot, 1816)	South America, western United States and extreme southwestern Canada; a rare visitor to the East Coast of the United States	Size: 35–48 cm Habitat: Diet:	LC
Blue-winged teal Male Female	Spatula discors (Linnaeus, 1766)	North America, where it breeds from southern Alaska to Nova Scotia and south to northern Texas, wintering south to northern South America	Size: 35–41 cm Habitat: Diet:	LC
Cape shoveler Male Female	Spatula smithii Hartert, 1891	South Africa, uncommon further north in Namibia, Botswana, Zimbabwe, southern Angola, Lesotho, Mozambique and Zambia	Size: 51–53 cm Habitat: Diet:	LC
Australasian shoveler Male Female	Spatula rhynchotis (Latham, 1801) Two subspecies: S. r. rhynchotis(Latham, 1801); S. r. variegata(Gould, 1856)	Australia, Tasmania and New Zealand	Size: 46–56 cm Habitat: Diet:	LC
Northern shoveler Male Female	Spatula clypeata (Linnaeus, 1758)	Northern areas of Europe and Asia and across most of North America, wintering south to northern Africa, southern Asia and northernmost South America	Size: 43–56 cm Habitat: Diet:	LC

=== Phylogeny ===
Cladogram based on the analysis of Johnson & Sorenson in 1999, and Gonzalez and colleagues in 2009; both studies reached the same conclusions:

- Spatula
  - - Garganey S. querquedula
    - - Blue-billed teal S. hottentota
      - - Puna teal S. puna
        - Silver teal S. versicolor
  - - Red shoveler S. platalea
    - - - Blue-winged teal S. discors
        - Cinnamon teal S. cyanoptera
      - - Cape shoveler S. smithii
        - - Northern shoveler S. clypeata
          - Australasian shoveler S. rhynchotis
