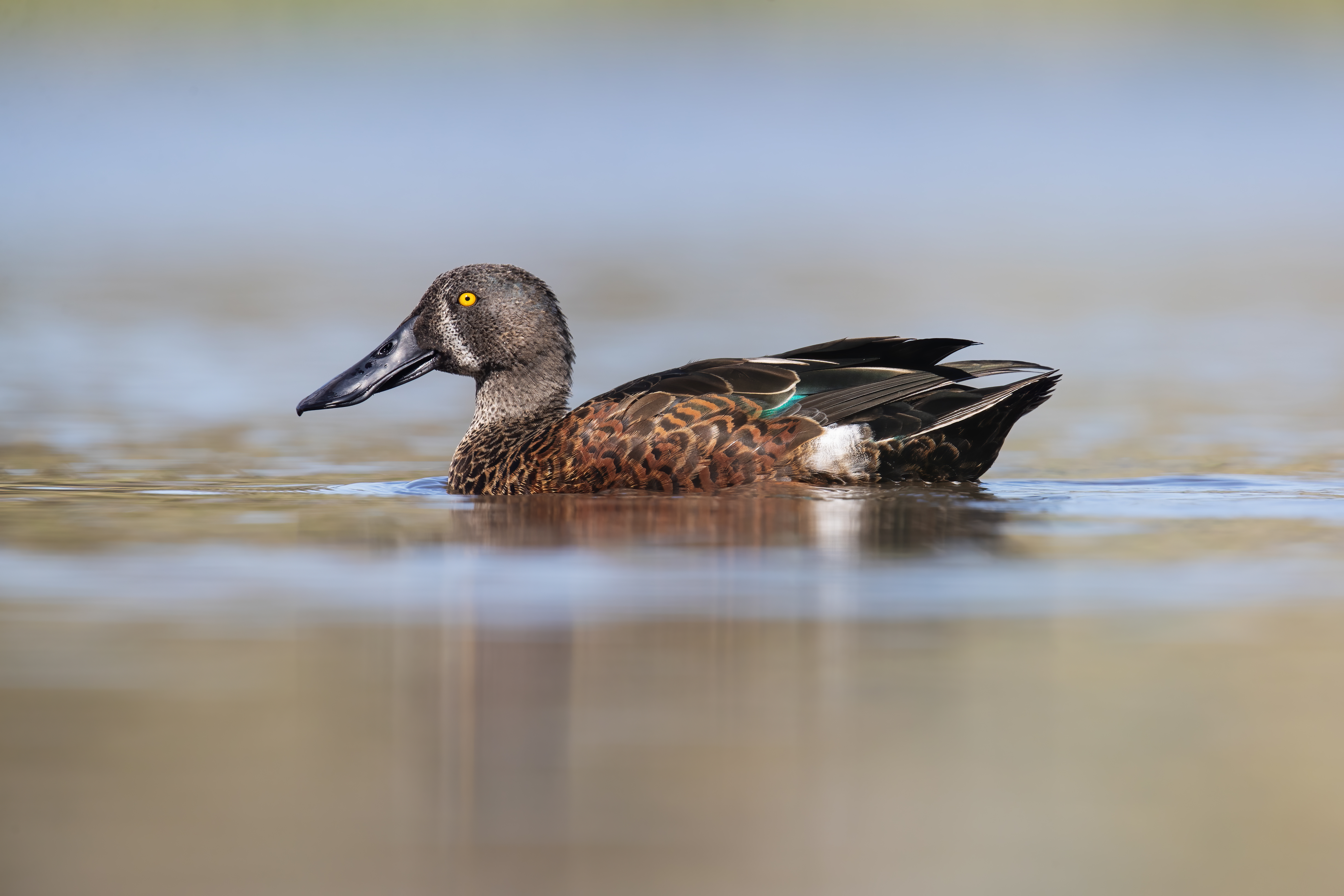
- Male
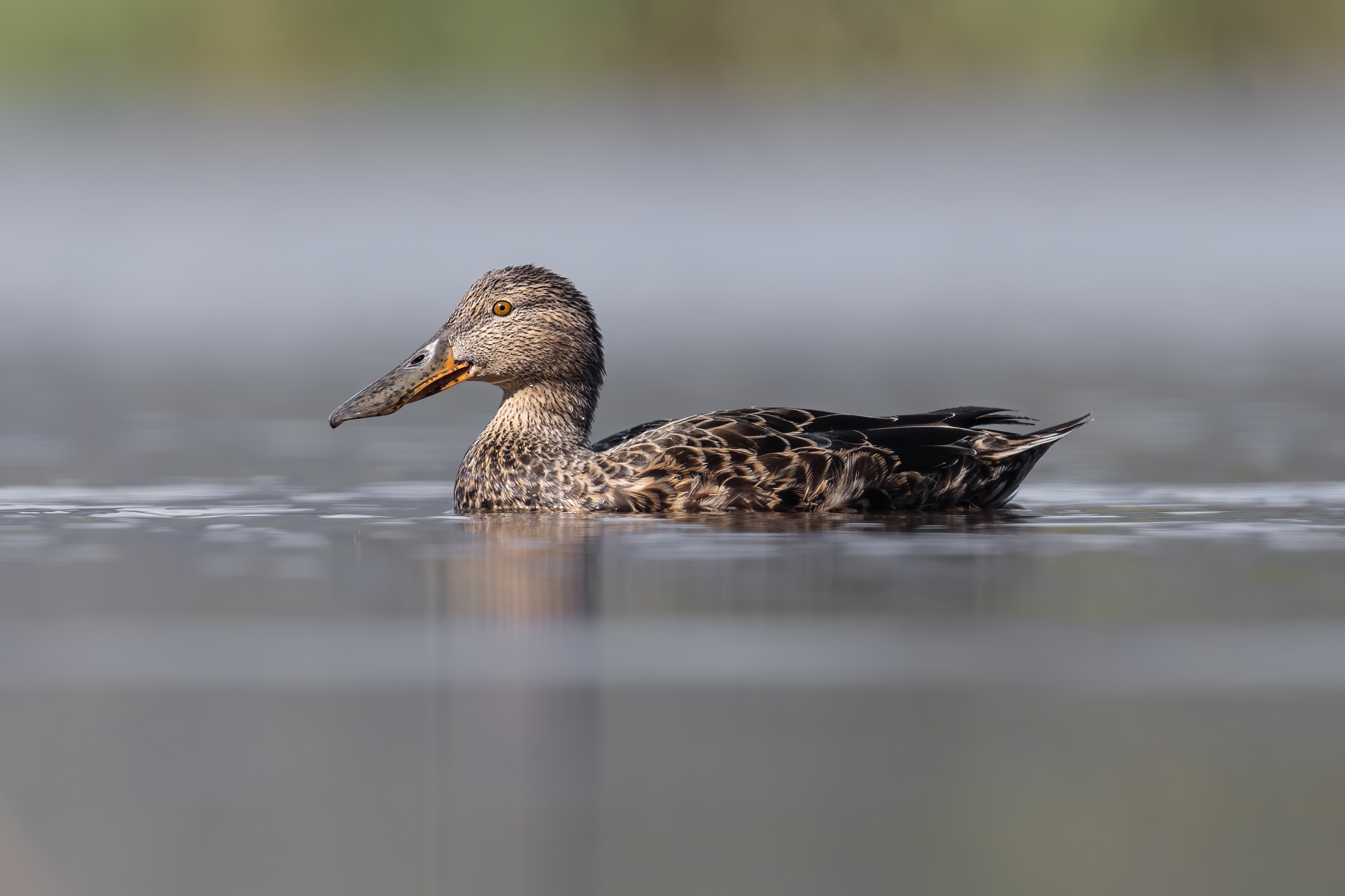
- Female

Conservation status
- Least Concern (IUCN 3.1)

Scientific classification
- Kingdom: Animalia
- Phylum: Chordata
- Class: Aves
- Order: Anseriformes
- Family: Anatidae
- Genus: Spatula
- Species: S. rhynchotis

Binomial name
- Spatula rhynchotis (Latham, 1801)

Subspecies
- S. r. rhynchotis (Latham, 1801) (Australian shoveler); S. r. variegata (Gould, 1856) (New Zealand shoveler)
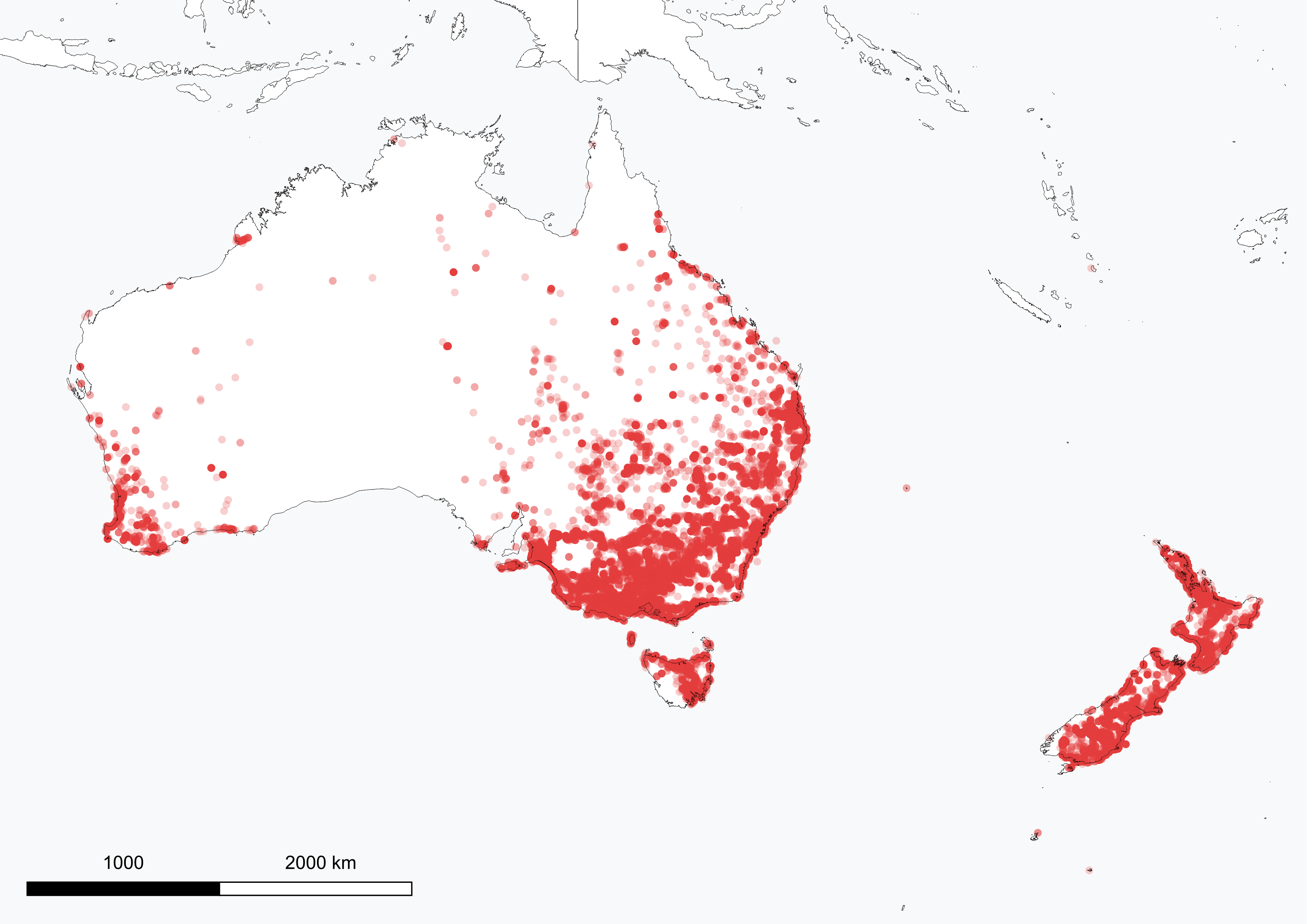
- Species distribution

Synonyms
- Anas rhynchotis Latham, 1801

= Australasian shoveler =

Species of bird

The Australasian shoveler (Spatula rhynchotis) is a species of dabbling duck in the genus Spatula. It ranges from 46 to 53 cm (18 to 21 in). It lives in heavily vegetated swamps. In Australia it is protected under the National Parks and Wildlife Act 1974. They occur in southwestern and southeastern Australia, Tasmania, and New Zealand. The male has a blue-grey head with a vertical white crescent in front of the eyes.

== Naming ==
The common name for the species Spatula rhynchotis is Australasian shoveler no matter which country it is found in. It was previously categorised as two subspecies:

- S. rhynchotis rhynchotis Australian shoveler, the nominate race, occurs in southwestern and southeastern Australia and Tasmania.
- S. rhynchotis variegata New Zealand shoveler, occurs in New Zealand.

Other names used include: spoonbill, shoveler, spoony, spoonie and shoveller. The Māori name is kuruwhengi.

The Australasian shoveler was described by the English ornithologist John Latham in 1801.

== Courtship and breeding in New Zealand ==
Courtship in New Zealand starts around August which involves vocalisations from the drake (male) accompanied with head-bobbing whilst swimming toward the duck (female). The most heard vocalisations are from the drakes in the form of a "Sock, sock-sock, sock, sock-sock". Often several drakes will pursue an already paired duck: Generally the mated males are aggressive and will not tolerate this behavior from the bachelors, and fighting may ensue. Courtship flights are common in the morning and evenings mostly, where the duck is followed in a short rapid flight by one or more (usually two) drakes. This tests the speed and agility of the drakes. The duck may be biased in picking the 'winner' in these tests however, especially if she has paired with one of the competitors. She will even sometimes excrete mid-flight on a pursuing male if he is especially not to her fancy. There is a clear and unexplained sex ratio difference with a lot more males to females. This difference is not present in broods of ducklings however. Males with a lot of white breast feathers are not usually paired. These white feathers are often a sign of an older shoveler as first year males almost never have them. Mating will occur as early as August, though nesting rarely happens until at least October.

== Gallery ==
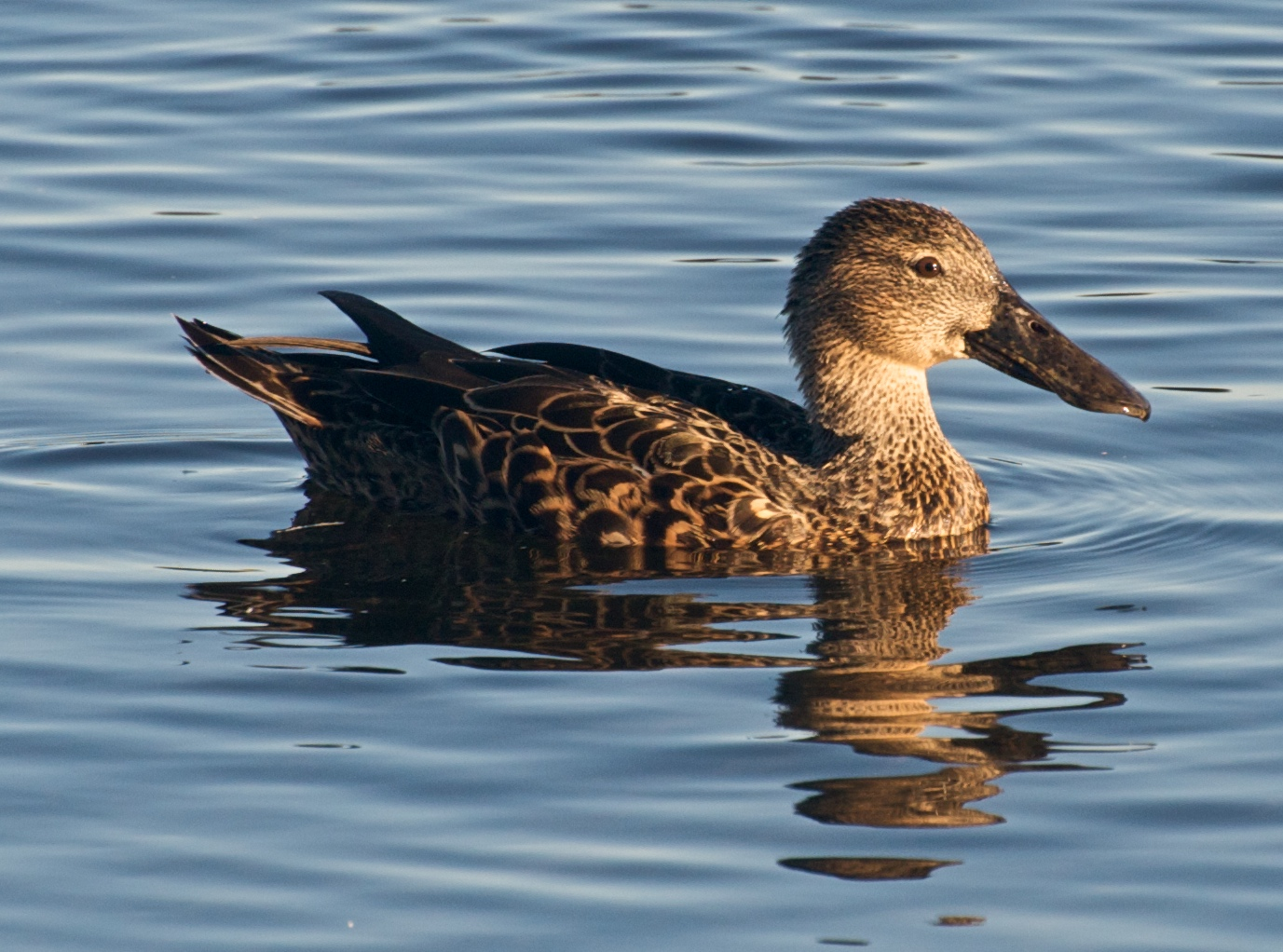
Female adult at Lake Monger

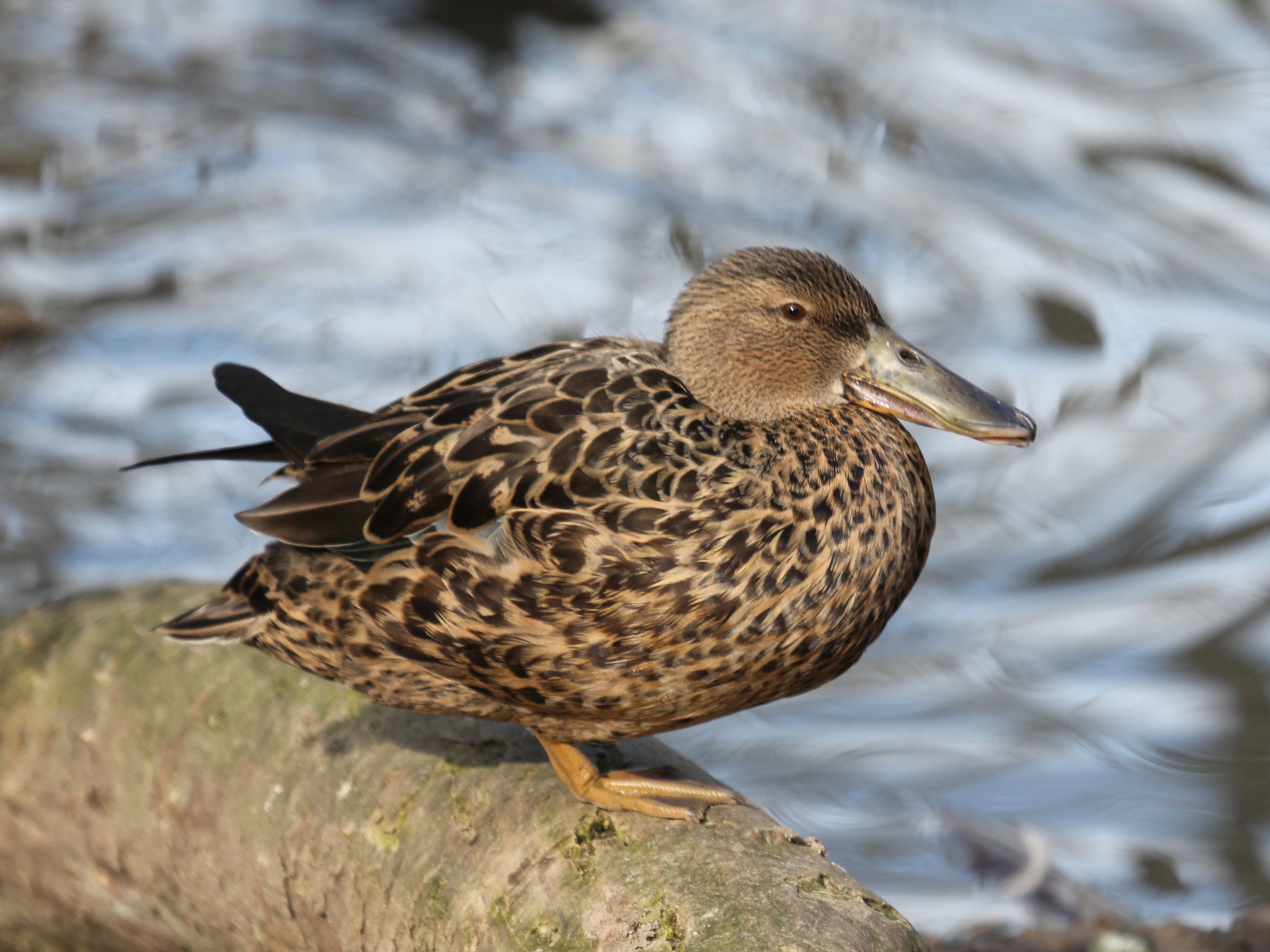
Female - Scotland Heights Waterfowl Park

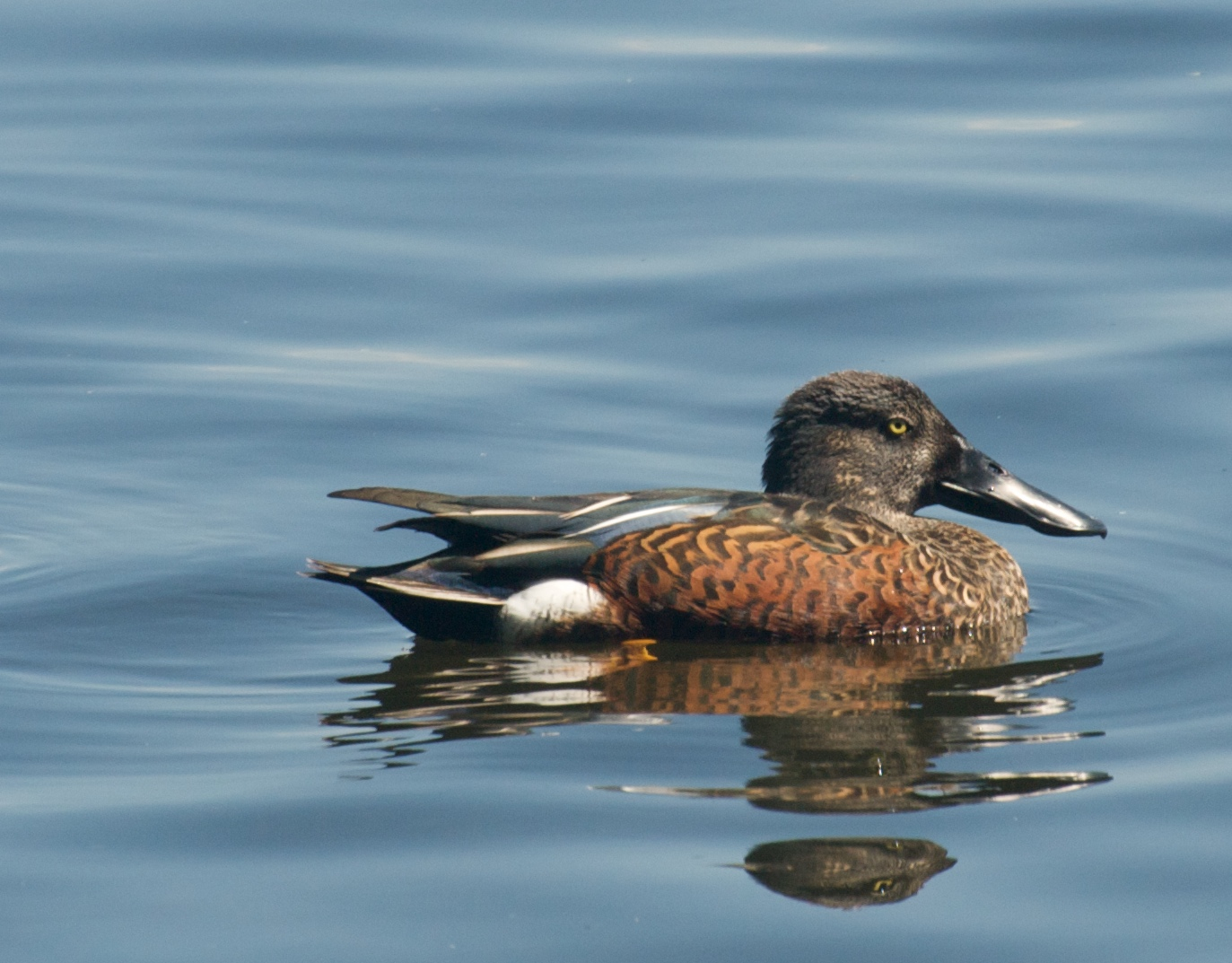
Male adult at Lake Monger

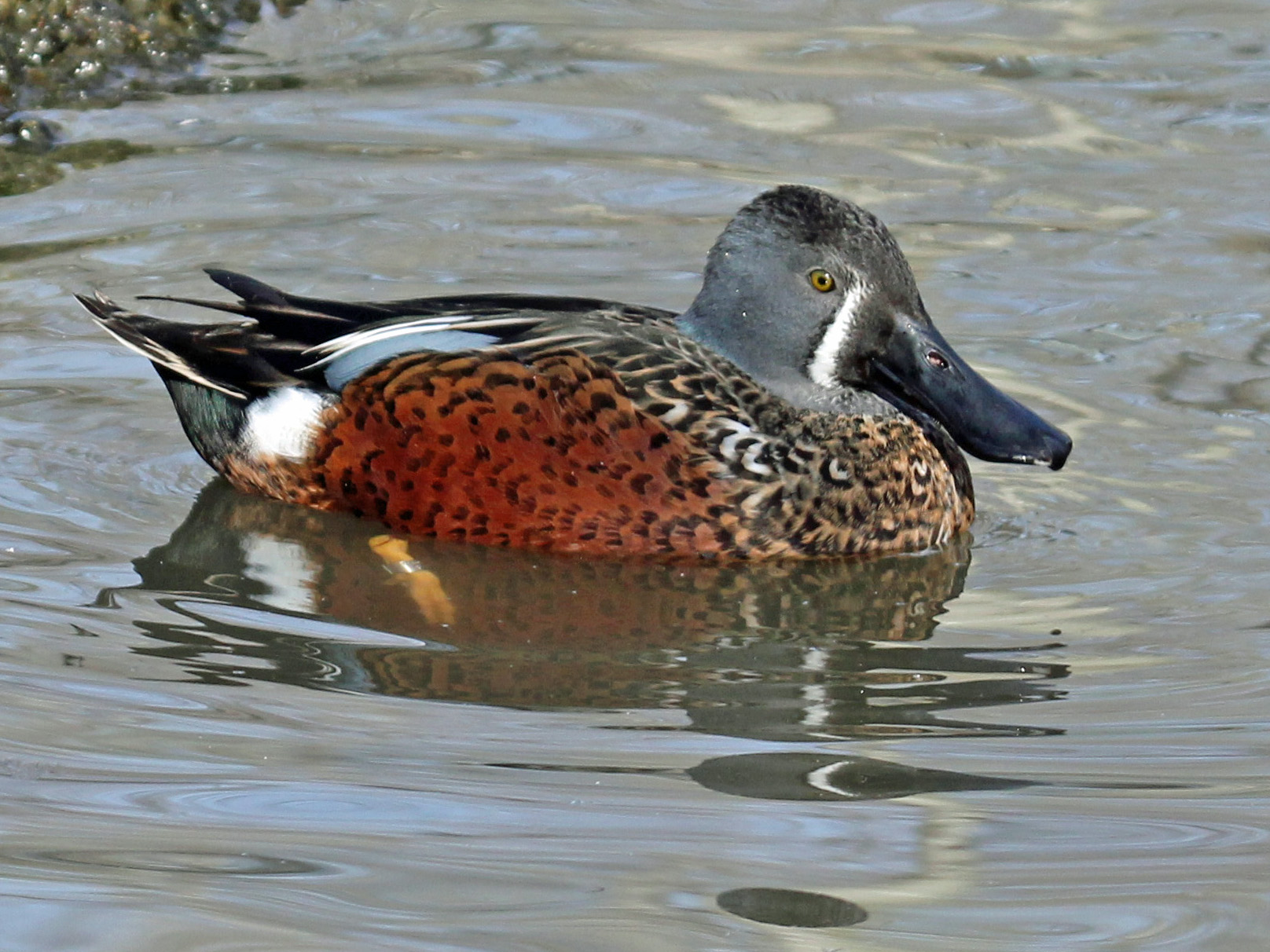
Male - Scotland Heights Waterfowl Park

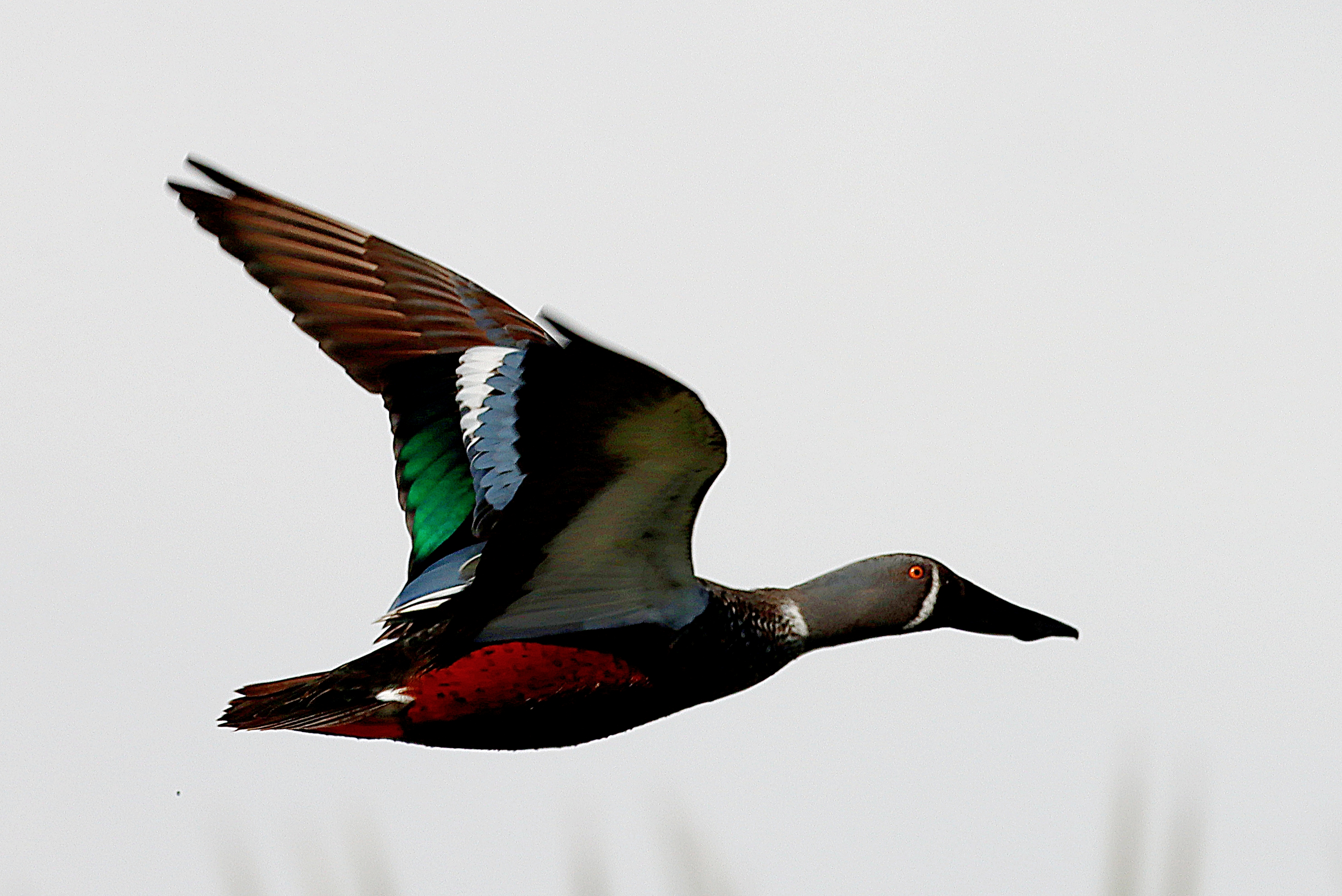
Male - Queen Elizabeth Park, New Zealand
